= Grade I listed buildings in Plymouth =

There are over 9,000 Grade I listed buildings in England. This page is a list of these buildings in the district of Plymouth in Devon.

== City of Plymouth ==
Name	Location	Type	Completed (Note: The date given is the date used by Historic England as significant for the initial building or that of an important part in the structure's description.)	Date designated	Grid ref. (Note: The grid reference is based on the British national grid reference system, sometimes known as OSGB36, used by the Ordnance Survey.) Geo-coordinates	Entry number (Note: The "List Entry Number" is a unique number assigned to each listed building and scheduled monument by Historic England.)	Image
Boringdon Hall	Boringdon, City of Plymouth	Great House	Medieval	20 February 1952	SX5393157780; 50°24′06″N 4°03′24″W	1330575	Boringdon Hall More images
Brewhouse, Royal William Victualling Yard	Stonehouse, Plymouth	Ordnance Factory	1929	13 August 1999	SX4601653553; 50°21′42″N 4°09′59″W	1378528	Brewhouse, Royal William Victualling Yard More images
Charles Church	City of Plymouth	Parish Church	1640–1658	25 January 1954	SX4821654605; 50°22′18″N 4°08′09″W	1130021	Charles Church More images
Church of St Andrew	City of Plymouth	Parish Church	Mid to Late 15th century	25 January 1954	SX4792054395; 50°22′11″N 4°08′24″W	1130012	Church of St Andrew More images
Clarence Steps, South West Quay Wall and 2 Bollards, Royal William Victualling Yard	Stonehouse, Plymouth	Gate	1826–1831	13 August 1999	SX4595153405; 50°21′37″N 4°10′02″W	1378526	Clarence Steps, South West Quay Wall and 2 Bollards, Royal William Victualling Yard More images
Clarence Store, Royal William Victualling Yard	Stonehouse, Plymouth	Naval Storehouse	1829–1831	13 August 1999	SX4597153460; 50°21′39″N 4°10′01″W	1378527	Clarence Store, Royal William Victualling Yard More images
Devonport Column	Devonport, City of Plymouth	Column	1824	25 January 1954	SX4531654402; 50°22′09″N 4°10′35″W	1322008	Devonport Column More images
Devonport Guildhall and Attached Walls	Devonport, City of Plymouth	Wall	1821–1822	25 January 1954	SX4532854385; 50°22′08″N 4°10′35″W	1322009	Devonport Guildhall and Attached Walls More images
Dock Basin Walls and 6 Associated Bollards, Royal William Victualling Yard	Stonehouse, Plymouth	Mooring Bollard	1826–1832	13 August 1999	SX4612253626; 50°21′45″N 4°09′53″W	1378529	Dock Basin Walls and 6 Associated Bollards, Royal William Victualling Yard More images
East Ropery, Formerly Spinning House (S 132), and Attached Retaining Walls	Devonport Dockyard, City of Plymouth	Fireproof Factory	Rebuilt 1813–1817	13 August 1999	SX4518854215; 50°22′03″N 4°10′41″W	1388400	East Ropery, Formerly Spinning House (S 132), and Attached Retaining Walls
Main Gate, Royal William Victualling Yard	Stonehouse, Plymouth	Gate	1829–1833	13 August 1999	SX4626053635; 50°21′45″N 4°09′46″W	1378530	Main Gate, Royal William Victualling Yard More images
Melville, Royal William Victualling Yard	Stonehouse, Plymouth	Fireproof Building	1828–1832	13 August 1999	SX4616253536; 50°21′42″N 4°09′51″W	1378531	Melville, Royal William Victualling Yard More images
Mills and Bakery, Royal William Victualling Yard	Stonehouse, Plymouth	Bakery	1830–1834	13 August 1999	SX4618553628; 50°21′45″N 4°09′50″W	1378532	Mills and Bakery, Royal William Victualling Yard More images
North East Quay Wall and 2 Bollards, Royal William Victualling Yard	Stonehouse, Plymouth	Wall	1826–1831	13 August 1999	SX4612353659; 50°21′46″N 4°09′53″W	1378533	North East Quay Wall and 2 Bollards, Royal William Victualling Yard More images
Oddfellows Hall	Devonport, City of Plymouth	Oddfellows Hall	1823	21 January 1954	SX4538054413; 50°22′09″N 4°10′32″W	1322006	Oddfellows Hall More images
Old Cooperage, Royal William Victualling Yard	Stonehouse, Plymouth	Ordnance Factory	1891	13 August 1999	SX4604253476; 50°21′40″N 4°09′57″W	1378536	Old Cooperage, Royal William Victualling Yard More images
Plympton House (St Peter's Convent)	Plympton St Maurice	Country House	1952	23 April 1952	SX5466055896; 50°23′06″N 4°02′45″W	1113363	Plympton House (St Peter's Convent) More images
Police Buildings, Royal William Victualling Yard	Stonehouse, Plymouth	House	Before 1891	13 August 1999	SX4625653615; 50°21′44″N 4°09′47″W	1378534	Police Buildings, Royal William Victualling Yard More images
Prysten House	City of Plymouth	Merchants House	c. 1498	25 January 1954	SX4792354371; 50°22′10″N 4°08′23″W	1067152	Prysten House More images
Royal Albert Bridge and 17 Approach Spans	Riverside	Suspension Bridge	1848	17 January 1952	SX4351558740; 50°24′28″N 4°12′13″W	1159292	Royal Albert Bridge and 17 Approach Spans More images
Saltram House	Saltram Park, City of Plymouth	Country House	18th century	23 April 1952	SX5203855605; 50°22′54″N 4°04′57″W	1386230	Saltram House More images
Slaughterhouse and Attached Yard Wall, Royal William Victualling Yard	Stonehouse, Plymouth	Wall	1830–1831	13 August 1999	SX4620853669; 50°21′46″N 4°09′49″W	1378535	Slaughterhouse and Attached Yard Wall, Royal William Victualling Yard More images
The Quadrangle (n 173-177, 186-191, 203)	Devonport Dockyard, City of Plymouth	Boiler House	1852–1861	13 August 1999	SX4490255661; 50°22′49″N 4°10′58″W	1378566	The Quadrangle (n 173-177, 186-191, 203) More images
Smeaton's Tower	Hoe, City of Plymouth	Lighthouse	1759	25 January 1954	SX4776253799; 50°21′52″N 4°08′31″W	1386470	Smeaton's Tower More images
Plymouth Naval War Memorial	The Promenade, Plymouth	War Memorial	1924	1 May 1975	SX4774053940; 50°21′56″N 4°08′32″W	1386464	Plymouth Naval War Memorial More images
