= St Andrew's Church, Plymouth =

Coordinates: 50.3698°N 4.1399°W

- Minster Church of St Andrew
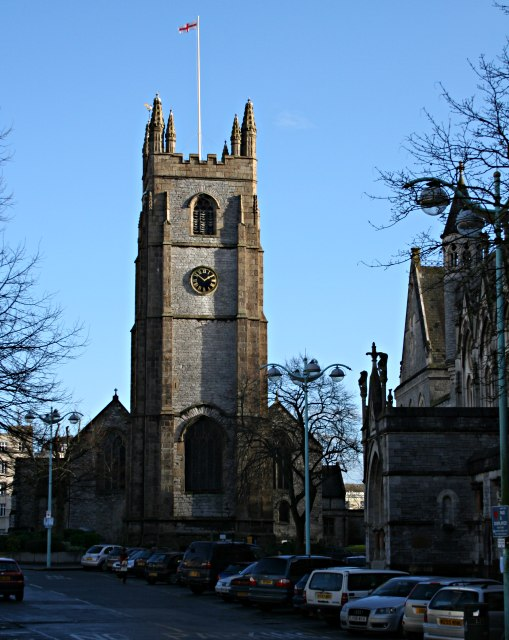
- Tower of St Andrew's Church
- St Andrew's Church, Plymouth
- OS grid reference: SX 47920 54395
- Location: Royal Parade, Plymouth, PL1 2AD
- Country: England
- Denomination: Church of England
- Churchmanship: Evangelical

History
- Status: Active

Architecture
- Functional status: Parish church

Administration
- Diocese: Diocese of Exeter
- Archdeaconry: Archdeaconry of Plymouth
- Deanery: Plymouth City
- Parish: St. Andrew Plymouth

Clergy
- Vicar: The Revd Joe Dent

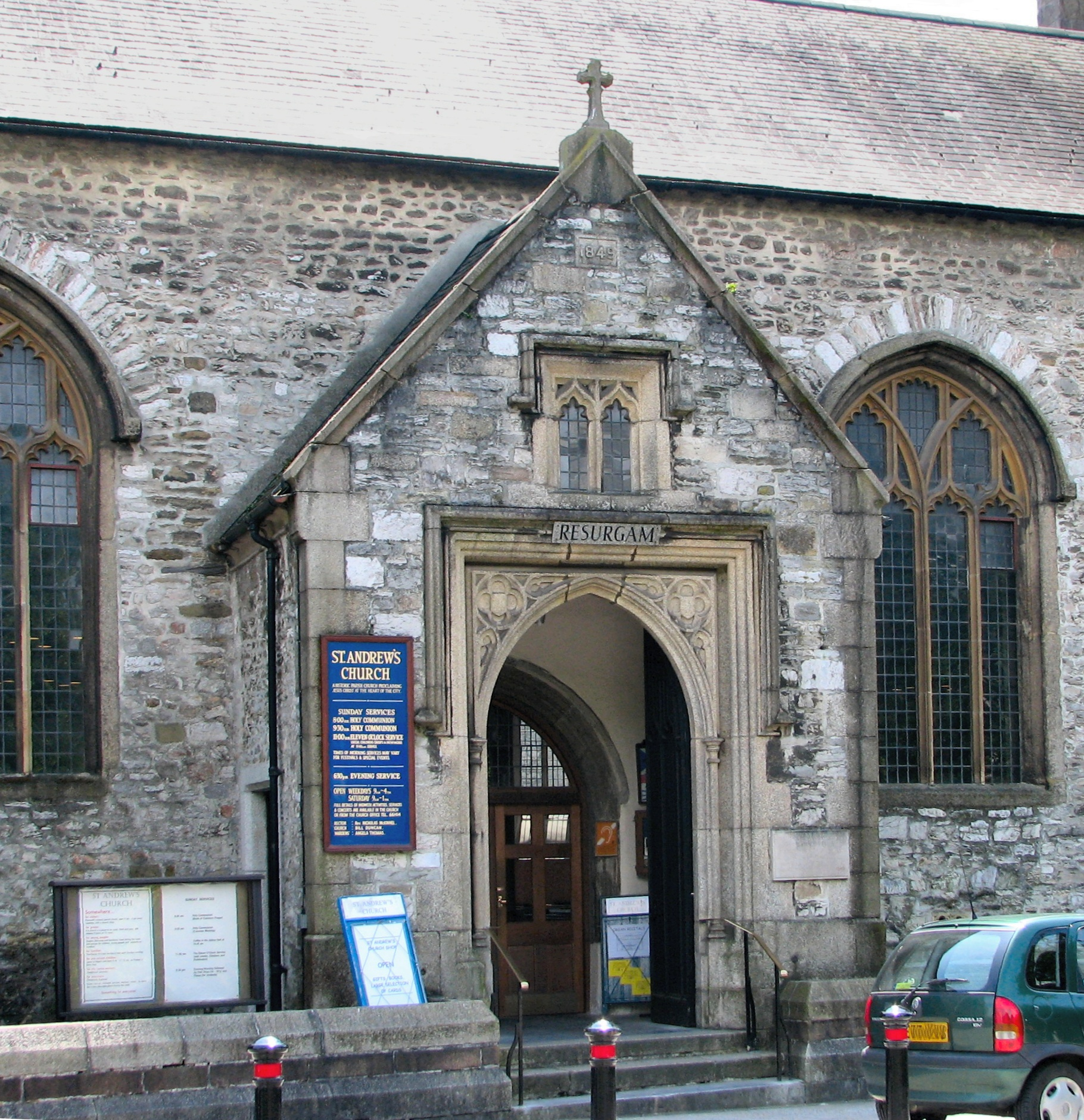
The Resurgam Door

The Minster Church of St Andrew, also known as St Andrew's Church, Plymouth is an Anglican church in Plymouth, Devon in England. It is the original parish church of Sutton, one of the three towns which were later combined to form the city of Plymouth. The church is the largest parish church in the historic county of Devon and was built in the mid to late 15th century. The church was heavily damaged during the Plymouth Blitz but was rebuilt after the war. It was designated as a Minster Church in 2009 and it continues to operate as the focus for religious civic events for the city and as a conservative evangelical church.

It is likely to be on the site of the original Saxon church and was once attached to the abbey of Plympton.

== History ==
The church existed at least as early as the beginning of the 11th century, but was possibly established in the 8th century. By the 15th century it needed to be enlarged because of the growth of the town. A Purbeck marble effigy tomb now located in the north transept is the only remaining feature of the earlier church. The principal building of Plymouth blue-sky limestone and Dartmoor granite corner buttressing in the Perpendicular style, took place between 1430 and 1490. with a plaque on the tower dating to 1460. It is known to have been restored three times, in 1824 by John Foulston, in 1875 by Sir George Gilbert Scott, and by Sir Frederick Etchells after extensive bomb damage in World War II. The Resurgam Door is a commemoration of this. The length is 185 feet (56 m) and the width 96 feet (29 m). There are two aisles on each side of the nave and one each side of the chancel. The arcades are of the type which is standard in Cornwall at the period. The tower is 136 feet (41 m) high and was funded by Thomas Yogge, a prosperous merchant, c. 1460. who built the wrongly-named Prysten House immediately located to the south of the Church.

The organ, the largest west of Bristol, was built by Rushworth and Dreaper to a design by George Harry Moreton, William Lloyd Webber and O. H. Peasgood. Dr Harry Moreton (1864–1961) was the organist of St Andrew's from 1885 to 1958.

=== Blitz ===
In March 1941, St Andrew's Parish Church was bombed and badly damaged. Amid the smoking ruins a headmistress nailed over the door a wooden sign saying simply Resurgam (Latin for I shall rise again), indicating the wartime spirit, a gesture repeated at other devastated European churches. That entrance to St Andrew's is still referred to as the "Resurgam" door and a carved granite plaque is now permanently fixed there.

The Church was re-roofed and restored by Etchells and re-consecrated on 30 November 1957, St Andrew's Day. The restoration includes a new chancel as the old one had been made into a ruin.

== Stained glass by John Piper ==
With all of the stained glass present in the church blown out during the blitz, in 1957, artist John Piper was commissioned to provide designs for a new window for the west tower. It was executed in glass by Piper's long-term collaborator, Patrick Reyntiens, and installed in 1962. On the back of this success, Piper and Reyntiens would be commissioned to provide another five windows for the church between 1963 and 1968, which together constitute one of the most comprehensive cycles of the artists' work anywhere.

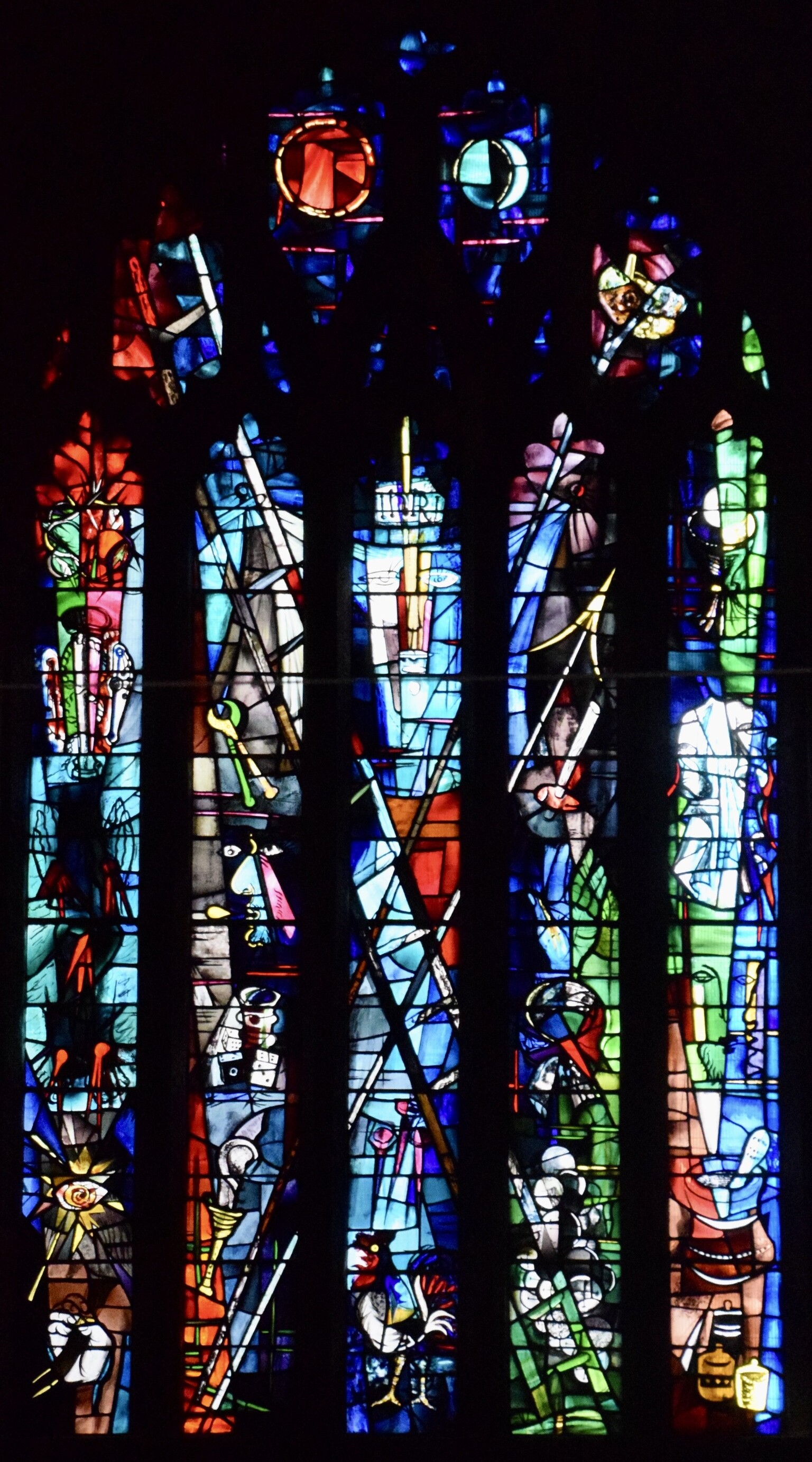
West tower window by John Piper and Patrick Reyntiens (1957-62)

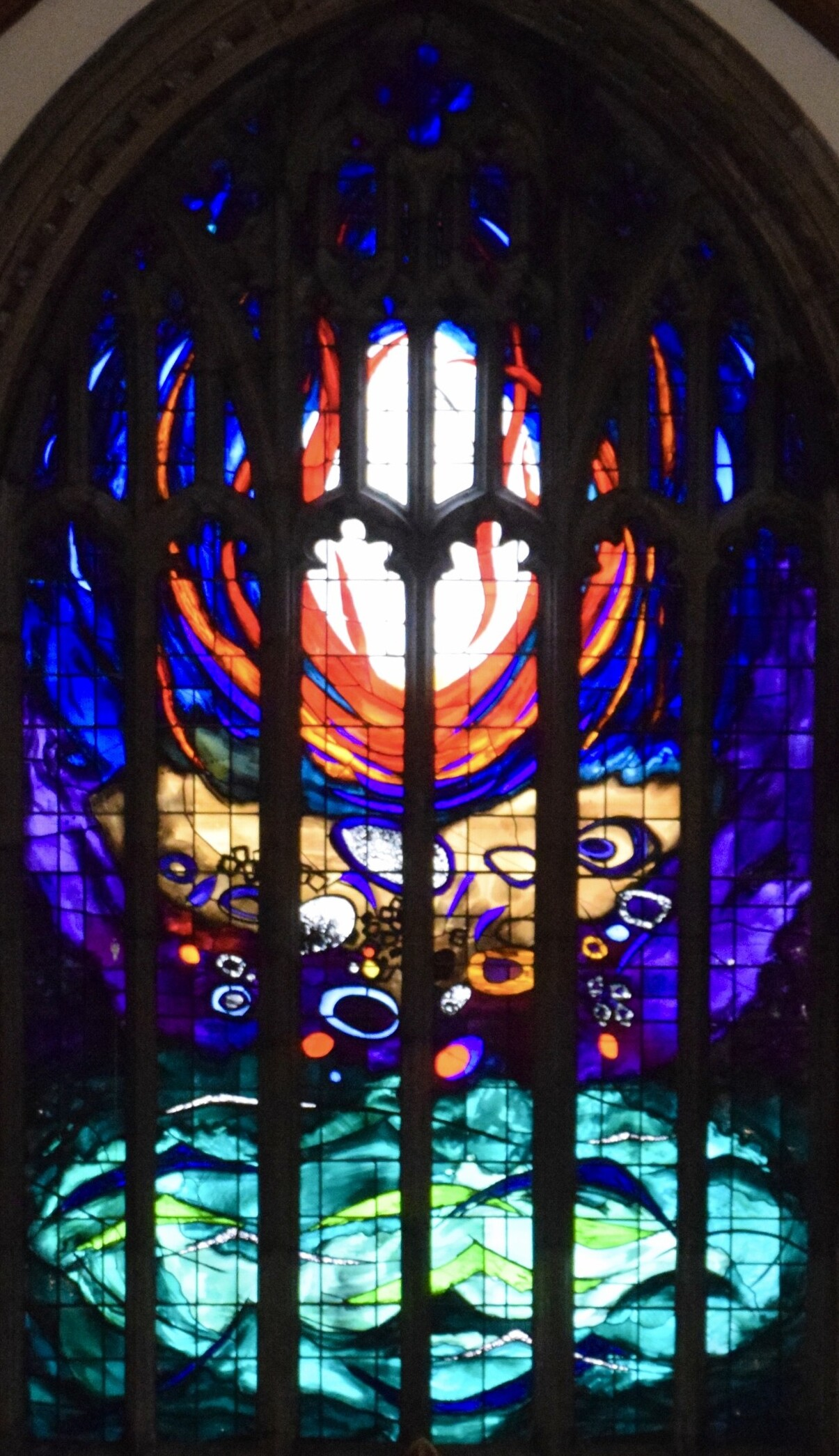
East chancel window by John Piper and Patrick Reyntiens (1963-1968)

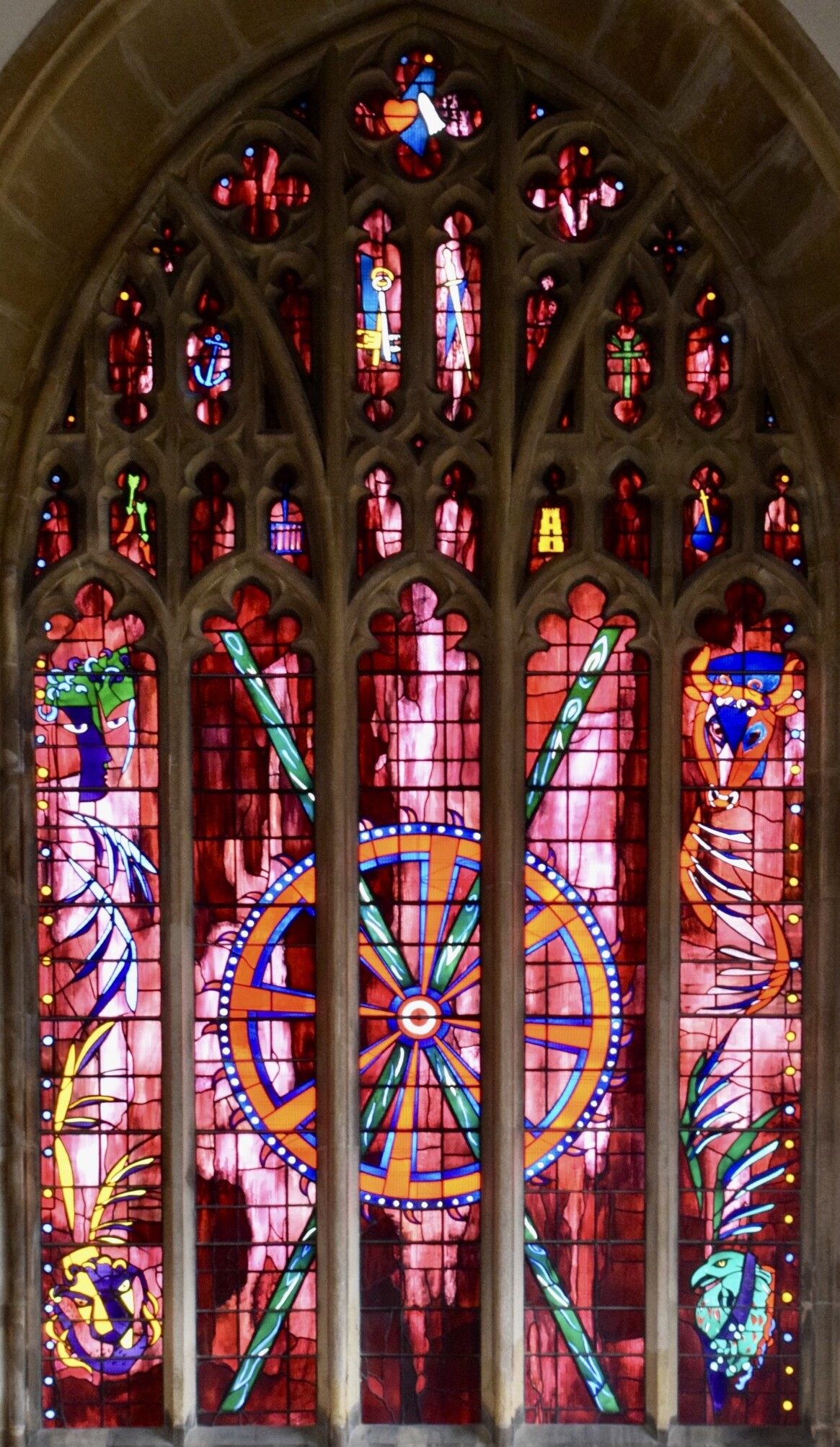
South east chapel window by John Piper and Patrick Reyntiens (1963-1968)

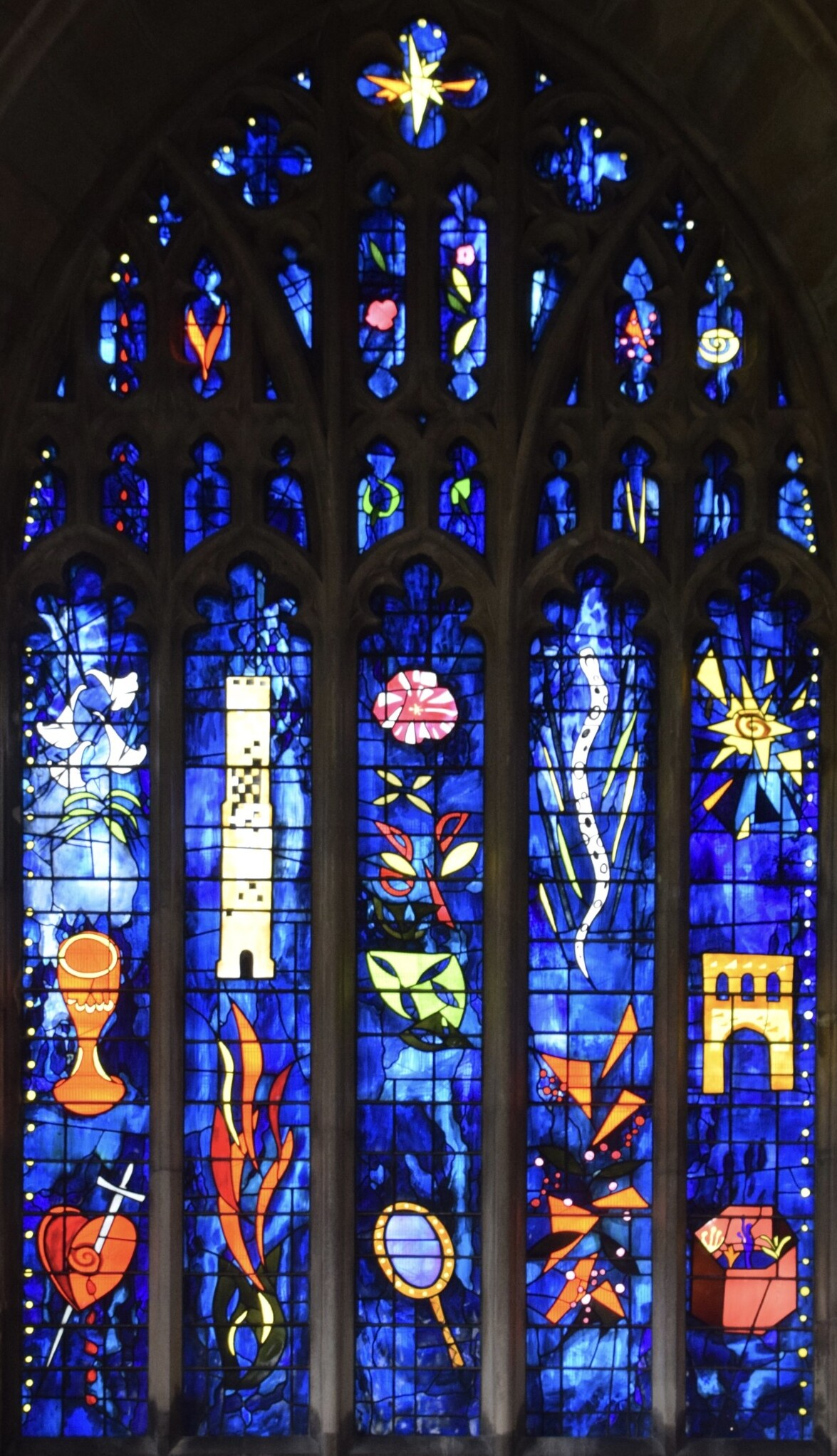
North east chapel window by John Piper and Patrick Reyntiens (1963-1968)

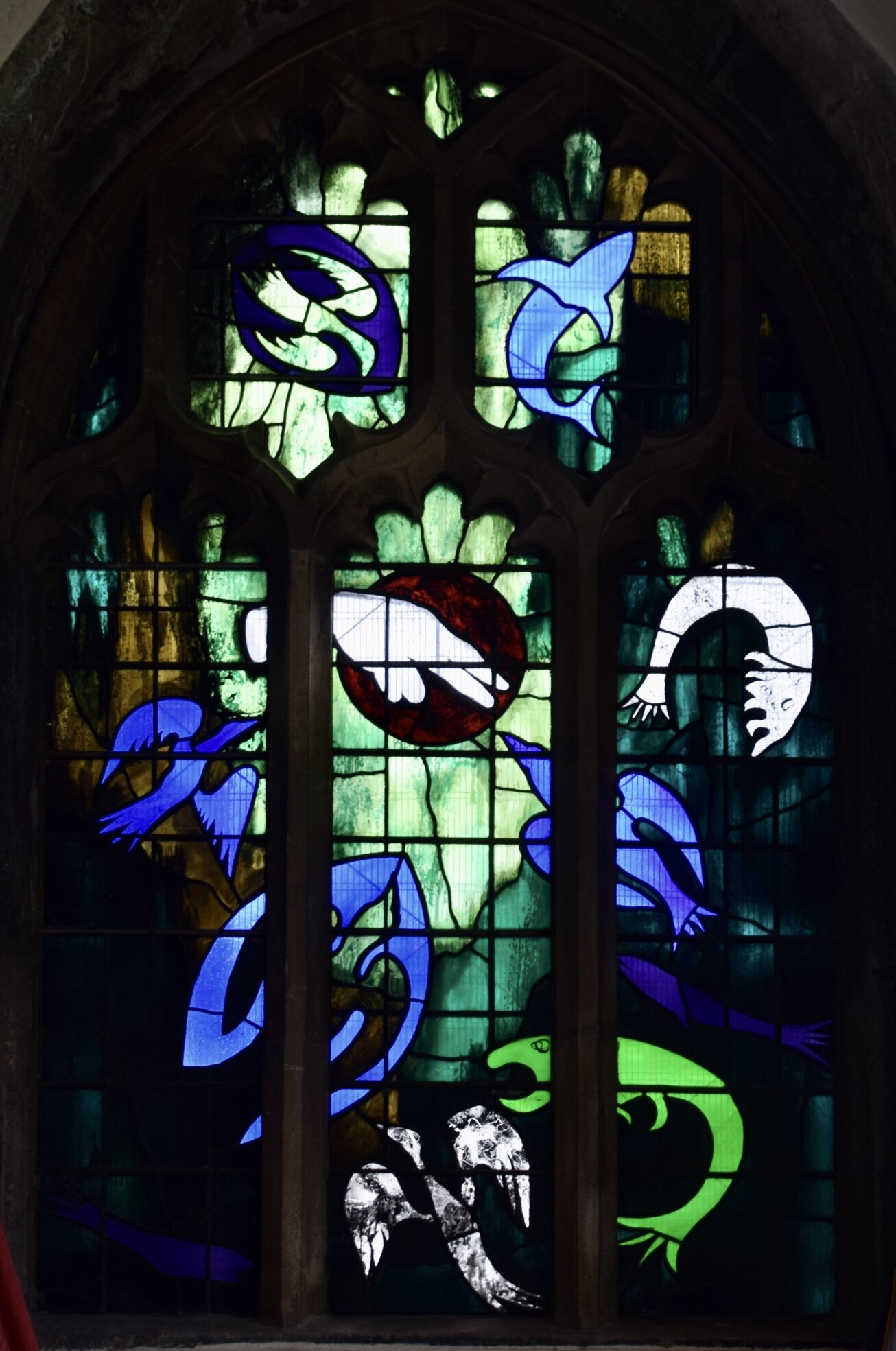
South chapel window by John Piper and Patrick Reyntiens (1963-1968)

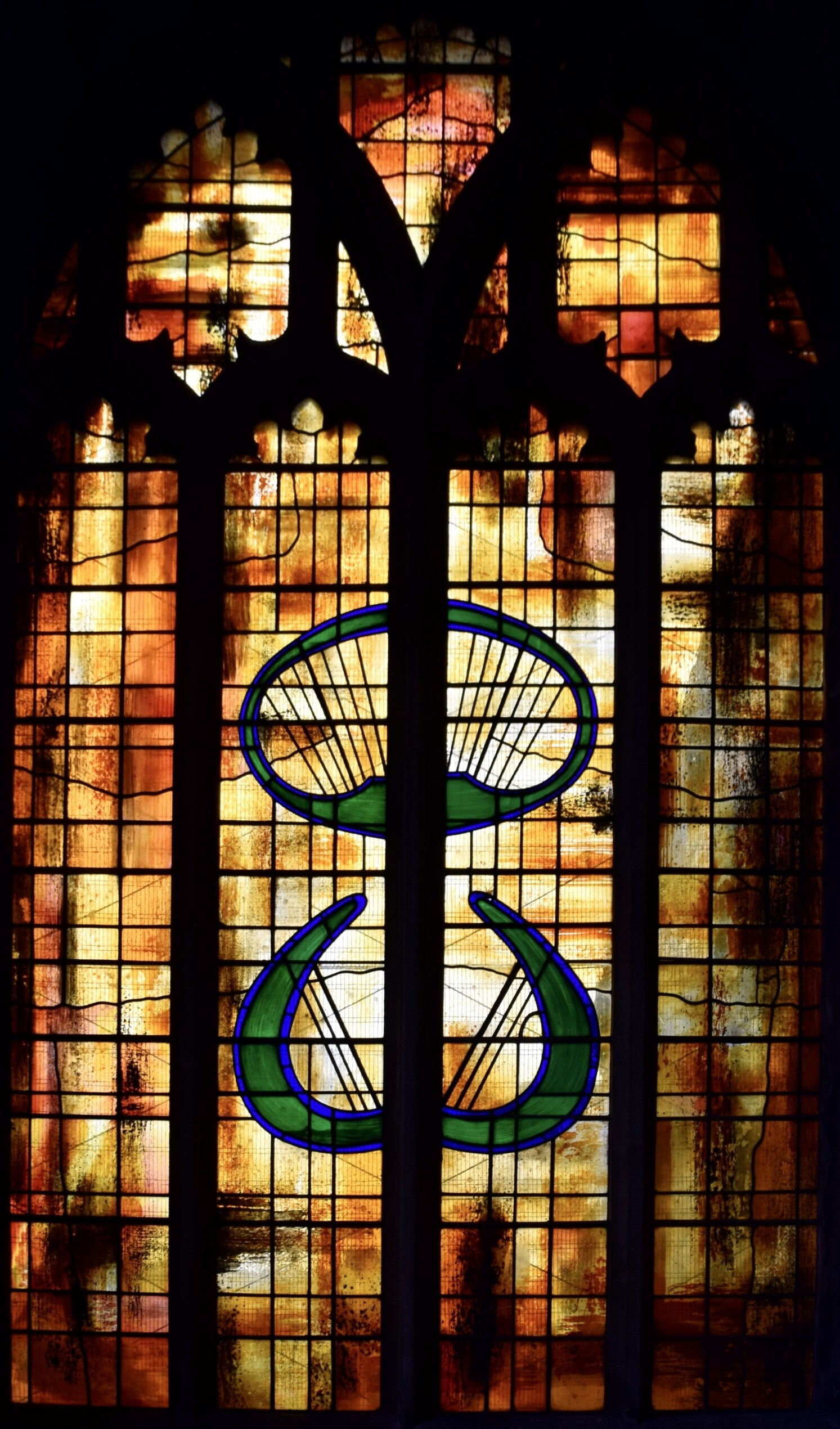
North aisle window by John Piper and Patrick Reyntiens (1963-1968)

== Present day ==
The church belongs to the conservative evangelical tradition of Anglicanism, and has expressed support for GAFCON.

== Plate ==
There is a notable collection of 17th-century plate, and one chalice and cover of 1590.

== Clergy ==
- John Cavell, Vicar from 1962 to 1972, later Bishop of Southampton
- William Hugh Alan Cooper, Vicar from 1951 to 1962, later Provost of Bradford 1962-1977 and Assistant Bishop in Karachi 1977-1980
- Ealphege, vicar in the reign of King William II (d. 1100)
- John Hatchard, vicar from 1824 to his death in 1869
- Joseph Hunkin began his career in 1914 with a curacy at St Andrew's; his last church appointment was as Bishop of Truro.
- Nick McKinnel, rector from 1994 to 2012 later bishop of Plymouth
- Clifford Martin, vicar from 1939 to 1944, later fourth Bishop of Liverpool.
- Rod Thomas, curate from 1993 to 1999, later Bishop of Maidstone and provincial episcopal visitor for conservative evangelicals in the Church of England
- Joseph Dent, Rector since 2013

== Notable people ==
- Katherine of Aragon, in thanksgiving for a safe voyage from Spain
- Francis Drake
- Martin Frobisher (organs buried there, body in London)
- John Hawkins
- King Charles II according to tradition performed touching for the king's evil here
- Admiral Robert Blake was interred here and afterwards removed to Westminster Abbey (his heart is still thought to be buried under the church)
- William Bligh, deposed in the Mutiny on the Bounty, was baptised here in 1754
