= Prysten House =

Grade I listed merchant's house in Plymouth, Devon

Coordinates: 50°22′10″N 4°08′24″W

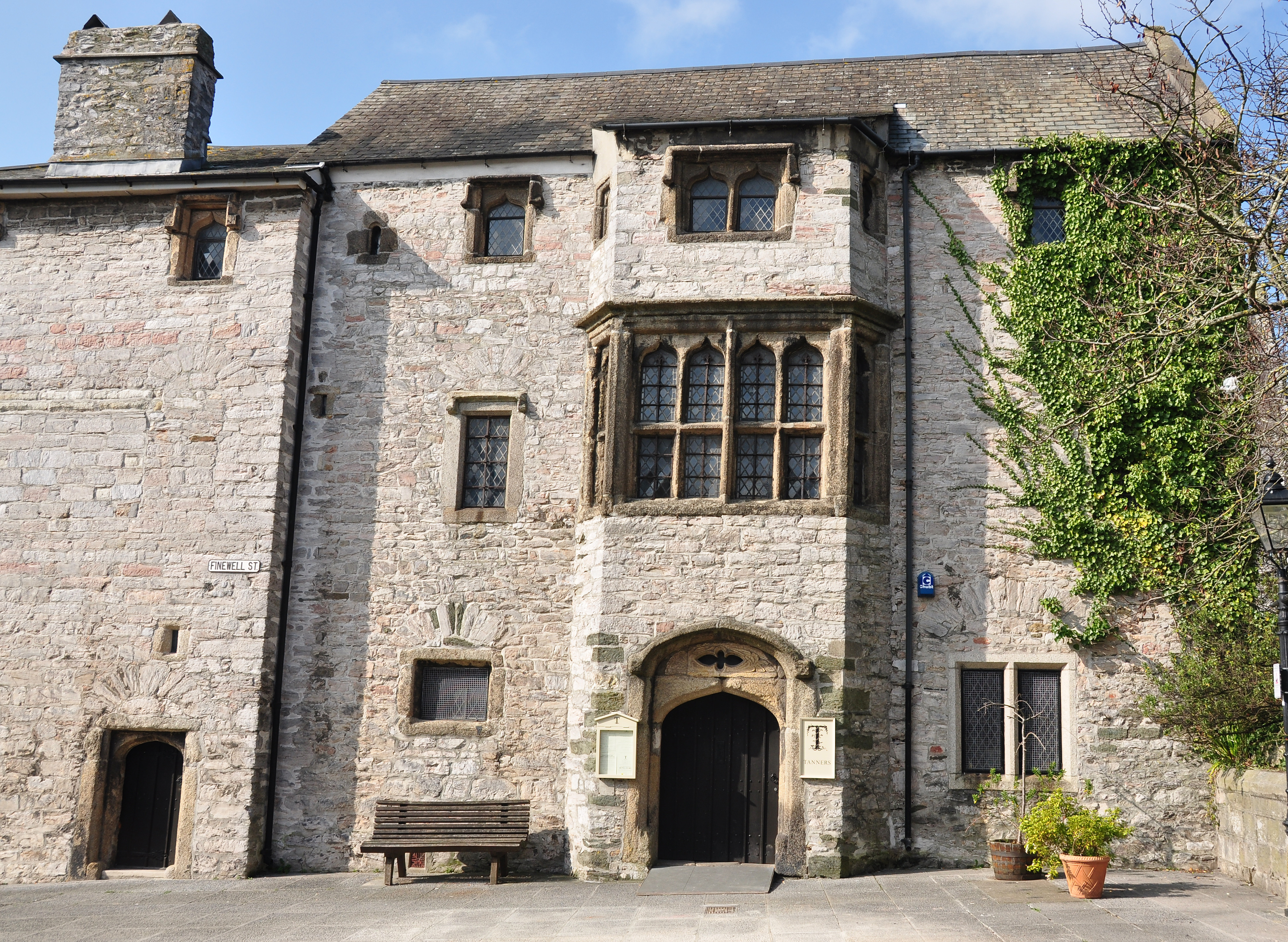
3-storey main east facade

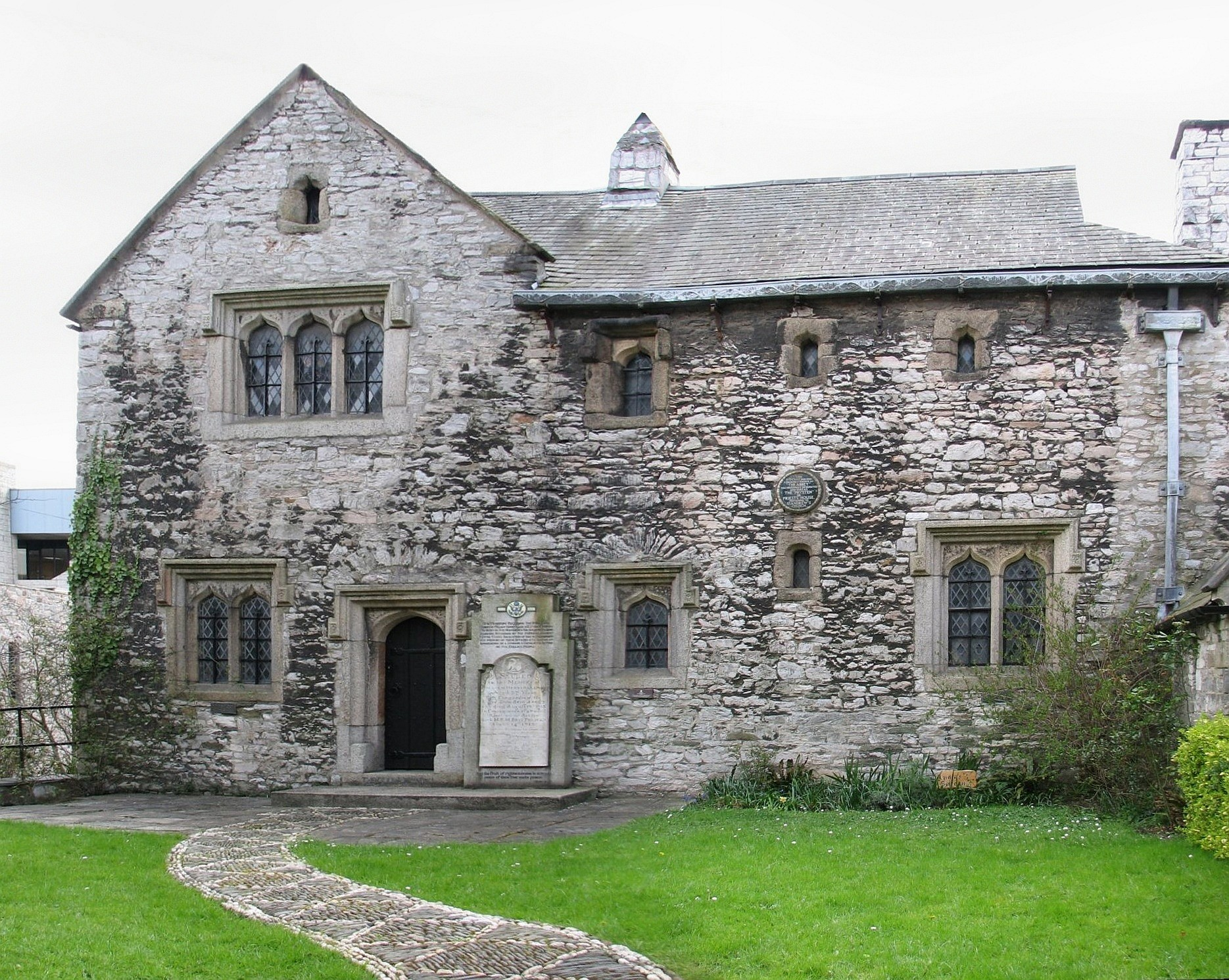
2-storey gabled north facade with slate pathway

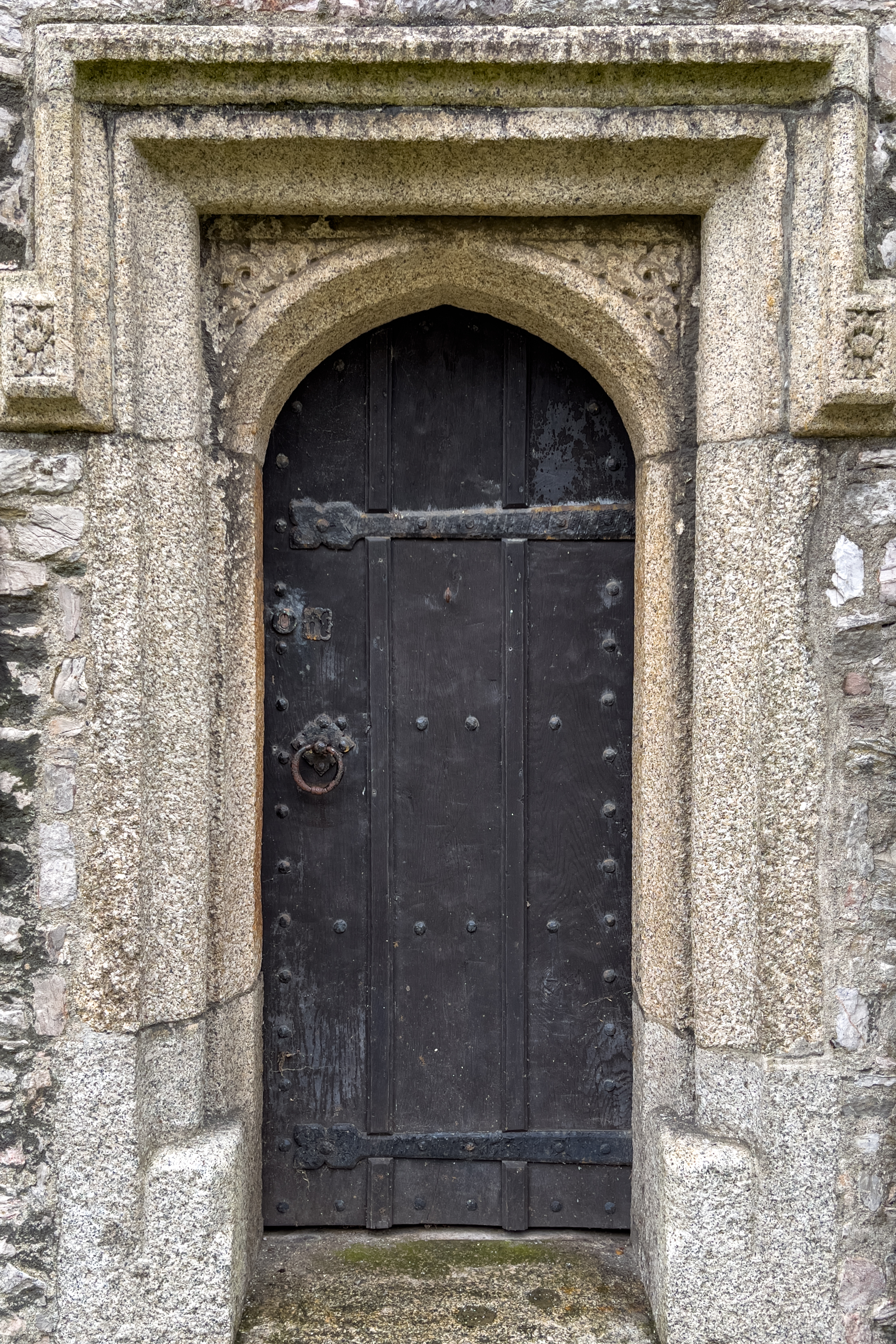
Door of Unity on the north garden

Prysten House is a Grade I listed 15th century merchant's house situated close to St Andrew's Church in the city of Plymouth, England. It is a large U-shaped three storey split level house built c. 1498 and extended 1635.

== Construction ==
It is constructed from Plymouth limestone rubble using relieving arches with Dartmoor granite hooded and ogee-framed Tudor dressings to glazed window openings, dry Devon slate roofs and two original lateral chimney stacks. The front has a distinctive and fine granite transomed bay window arrangement over a decorated and hooded doorway.

== History ==
The building is owned by The Minster Church of St Andrew and has been used as a museum and a restaurant, but contrary to the misnomer has never been a priest's house, its name originating simply from its close proximity to St Andrew's Church, Plymouth.

Prysten House is home to the Plymouth Tapestry designed by Tom Mor and displays a model of Plymouth in 1620. As of April 2015 the museum is not open to the public, but the restaurant is open.

Prysten House also features the "Door of Unity" commemorating the War of 1812.

== See also ==
- Grade I listed buildings in Plymouth
