= John Foulston =

English architect (1772–1841)

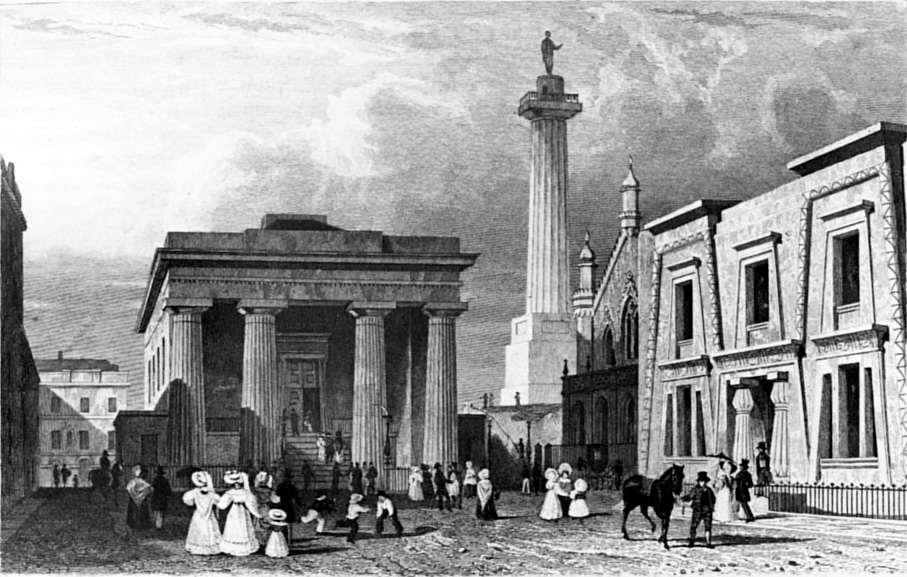
- An 1820s print of Foulston's town hall, column and library in Devonport
- Born: 1772
- Died: 30 December 1841 (aged 68–69); Plymouth, England
- Occupation: Architect

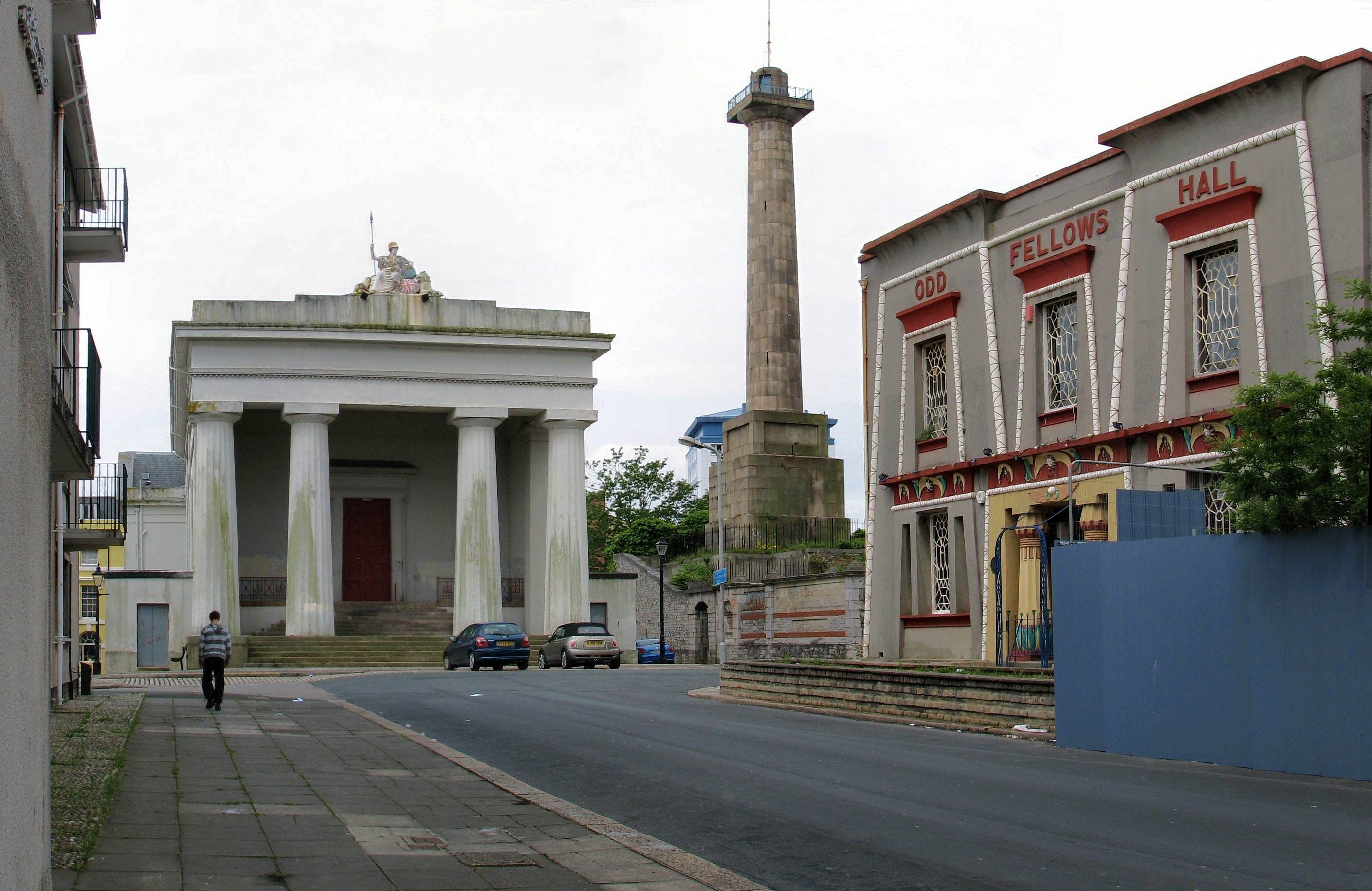
The same view in 2008

John Foulston (1772 – 30 December 1841) was an English architect who was a pupil of Thomas Hardwick and set up a practice in London in 1796. In 1810 he won a competition to design the Royal Hotel and Theatre group of buildings in Plymouth, Devon, and after relocating he remained Plymouth's leading architect for twenty-five years.

== Planning of Plymouth ==
At the time, Plymouth was a prosperous port town, separated along the coast of Plymouth Sound from the neighbouring towns of East Stonehouse and Devonport; collectively known as the Three Towns. Foulston was responsible for the creation of Union Street from the Frankfort Gate which was built across marshland to unite the three towns.

=== Ker Street, Devonport ===
Most of Foulston's work was in the Greek Revival style, but his best known project was the creation of a group of buildings in Ker Street, Devonport in 1821–24. This eclectic group consisted of a Greek Doric town hall and commemorative column; a terrace of houses in Roman Corinthian style and two houses in Greek Ionic; a "Hindoo" nonconformist chapel and an "Egyptian" library. Of these, all but the chapel and the houses survive, and are Grade I listed.

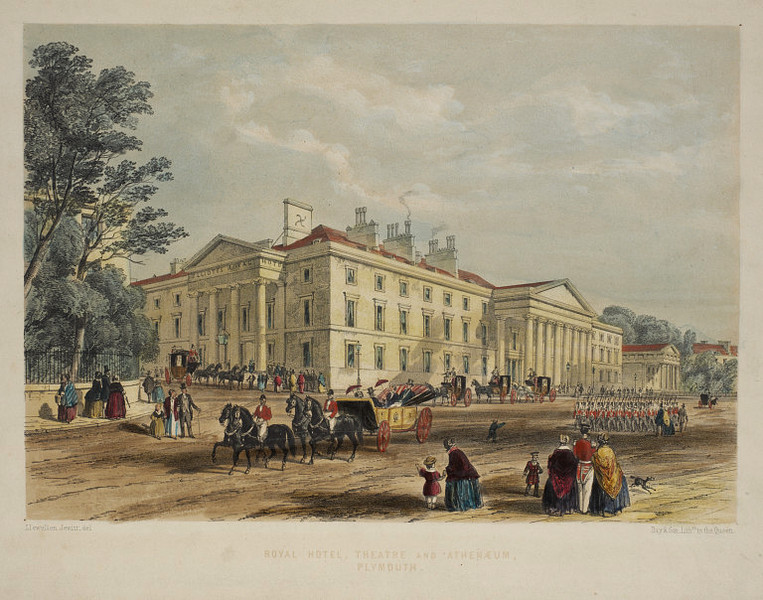
The Royal Hotel, Plymouth

=== The Royal Hotel, Theatre and Assembly Rooms ===
Foulston's Royal Hotel, Theatre and Assembly Rooms were built between 1811 and 1818. The theatre was notable for being one of the first buildings in Britain to use cast and wrought iron for parts of its main structure; it was demolished just before World War II to make way for a cinema.

=== Other works ===
Among his other works in Plymouth were The Plymouth Athenaeum, home of the Plymouth Institution of which Foulston was a member. The Athenaeum (1818–19) was bombed during World War II in 1941 and later demolished. Belmont House (c. 1825), The Proprietary Library (1812, destroyed by bombing, 1941), The Royal Union Baths (1828, demolished 1849 to make way for Millbay railway station), and St. Catherine's Church (1823, demolished 1958). He also designed many stucco-faced terraces and suburban villas, some of which survive as listed buildings.

In 1818 he designed the asterisk-shaped Cornwall County Asylum at Bodmin, later known as St Lawrence's Hospital, and now a Grade II* listed apartment building.

In Torquay he built the ballroom (1830, demolished), and in Tavistock he restored the medieval abbey gatehouse in Gothic style. Foulston remodelled Warleigh House in Bickleigh in the Gothic style in the 1830s.

"Augustus of Rome was for building renowned
And of marble he left what of brick he had found:
But was not our Foulston a very great master?
He found us all brick and left us all plaster."

—Epigram, based on one written about John Nash, published in the Western Antiquary (1884)

== Later life and career ==
Not long before he retired he took into his partnership the architect George Wightwick who succeeded to his practice. After his retirement, Foulston created a set of watercolour drawings of some of his buildings, which are now in the City Art Gallery. He became a fellow of the Institute of British Architects in 1838, and in the same year published "The Public Buildings of the West of England", a book that included plans and drawings of many of his buildings.

In his later years he created an elaborate water garden at his home (Athenian Cottage in the suburb of Mutley), and he was wont to drive round the streets of the town in a gig disguised as a Roman war chariot. He died at his home and is buried in St Andrew's new cemetery in Plymouth.
