= Raglan Barracks, Devonport =

Military building in Plymouth, England

Raglan Barracks
- Devonport
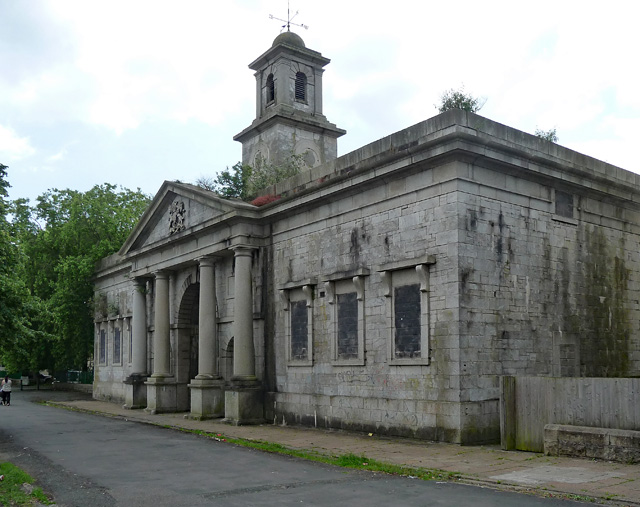
- Raglan Barracks (the surviving gatehouse)

Site information
- Type: Barracks

Location
- Location within Devon
- Coordinates: 50.37167°N 4.17237°W

Site history
- Built: 1853–1856
- Built for: War Office
- In use: 1856-1970s

Raglan Barracks was a military installation at Devonport.

== History ==
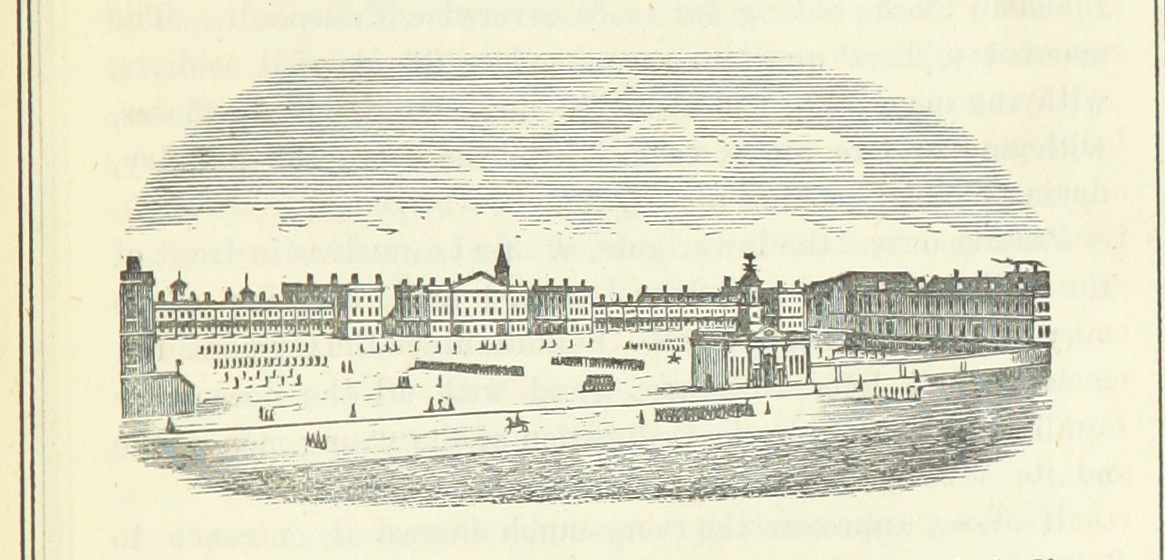
Raglan Barracks, Devonport (as pictured in 1879).

The barracks were designed by Captain Francis Fowke to accommodate two entire regiments in transit for operations overseas and were built between 1853 and 1856. Named after FitzRoy Somerset, 1st Baron Raglan, the barracks were built in the colonial style with flat roofs and verandas. The site, which had a huge parade ground, was first occupied by the 96th Regiment of Foot in December 1858.

The Prince of Wales presented new colours to the 2nd Battalion The Duke of Cornwall's Light Infantry at the barracks in November 1887 and the Duke of Cambridge presented colours to the 2nd Battalion, The Somerset Light Infantry there in May 1895.

The barracks were demolished in the early 1970s. The main gateway, which survives, is a Grade II listed building. It was being restored and converted into four 'duplex apartments' in 2023.
