= Devonport Guildhall =

Municipal building in Devon, England

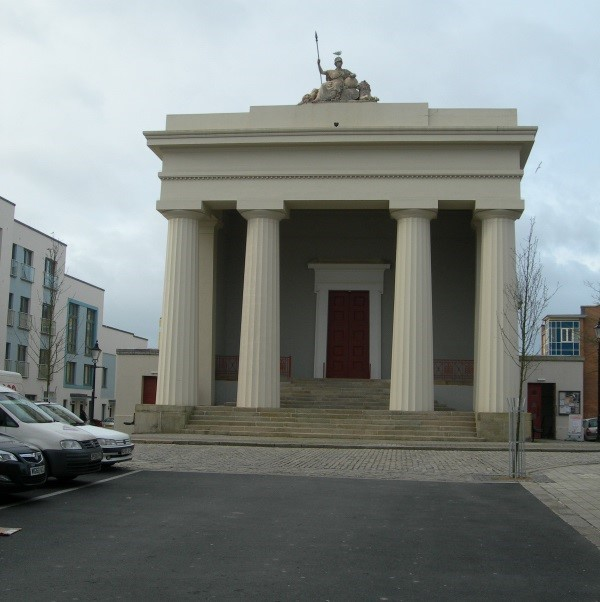
- Devonport Guildhall pictured in 2012

- Location within Devon
- 50.3689°N 4.1762°W
- Location: Devonport, Plymouth, Devon, England

History
- Built: 1821–1824
- Original use: Town hall, courthouse, mortuary, police station

Site notes
- Architect: John Foulston
- Architectural style: Regency style

Listed Building – Grade I
- Official name: Devonport Guildhall and Attached Walls
- Type: Listed Building
- Designated: 25 January 1954
- Reference no.: 1322009

Devonport Guildhall is a municipal building that served as a municipal hall, courthouse, mortuary, and police station, located in the municipal centre of the town of Devonport, in Plymouth, Devon, England. The site fell into disrepair and since the mid-1980s has been repurposed for community facilities. It is a Grade I listed building.

== History ==
=== Building of the guildhall ===
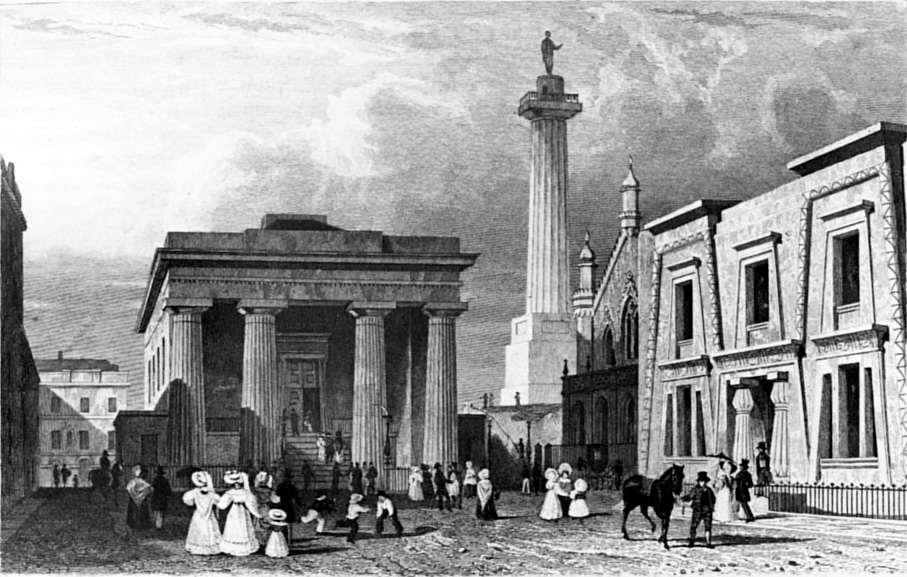
John Foulston's Town Hall, Column and Library in Devonport, c. 1825.

The guildhall, which was designed by John Foulston in the Regency style with Greek Doric features, was completed between 1821 and 1824. Foulston designed a cluster of four buildings together in the area: the Guildhall, Column and Oddfellow's Hall still stand today whilst his Mount Zion Calvinist Chapel is now lost. The area of Devonport was then called Plymouth Dock and the presence of the Royal Navy brought prosperity to the area. A petition was taken to King George IV, who granted permission for the area to be called Devonport in 1824.

Devonport Guildhall was home to the magistrates court and the Mayor's Parlour and also was used for social events (the courtroom had removable fixtures to hold events and balls in the evening). There were cells and a mortuary, and a police station at the rear of the building. It was also the meeting place of the county borough of Devonport established under the Local Government Act 1888.

=== Decline and refurbishment ===
The building fell into disrepair when the Three Towns of Plymouth, Devonport and Stonehouse amalgamated in 1914 and municipal functions were transferred to the expanded City of Plymouth. Still utilised for the city, the building had a variety of uses, including as a gas-mask collection point during the Second World War. After it fell into neglect, Guildhall restorations were attempted – notably in 1986 when it reopened as a Citizen's Advice Bureau, Library, a playgroup, cafe and sports hall – but failed to survive due to the sheer size of the building. In 2009, Real Ideas Organisation was awarded a £1.75 million Community Assets Grant, with which they embarked on the careful and painstaking restoration of Devonport Guildhall to its former glory. Working closely with Plymouth City Council and the former Devonport Regeneration Community Partnership, RIO renovated Devonport Guildhall with the local community in mind. The building, which is run by a social enterprise, re-opened in 2010.

== See also ==
- Guild
