= Devonport Column =

Grade I listed monument in Plymouth, Devon

Coordinates: 50°22′09″N 4°10′35″W

Devonport Column is a monument designed by John Foulston in Devonport, Plymouth, England. It is situated next to Devonport Guildhall, also designed by Foulston.

== History ==
Devonport Column was built in 1824 as part of the development of the town of Devonport. It is 124 feet tall.

Devonport Column served as a post for firewatch duties during the Blitz with one policeman at the top and another at the bottom to relay messages.

== Conservation and access ==
Public access was restricted in the 1950s and it closed completely in the early 1990s. After a grant from the Heritage Lottery Fund, it can now be climbed again via the spiral 137 stepped staircase to enjoy the view over Plymouth and Dartmoor.

== Gallery ==
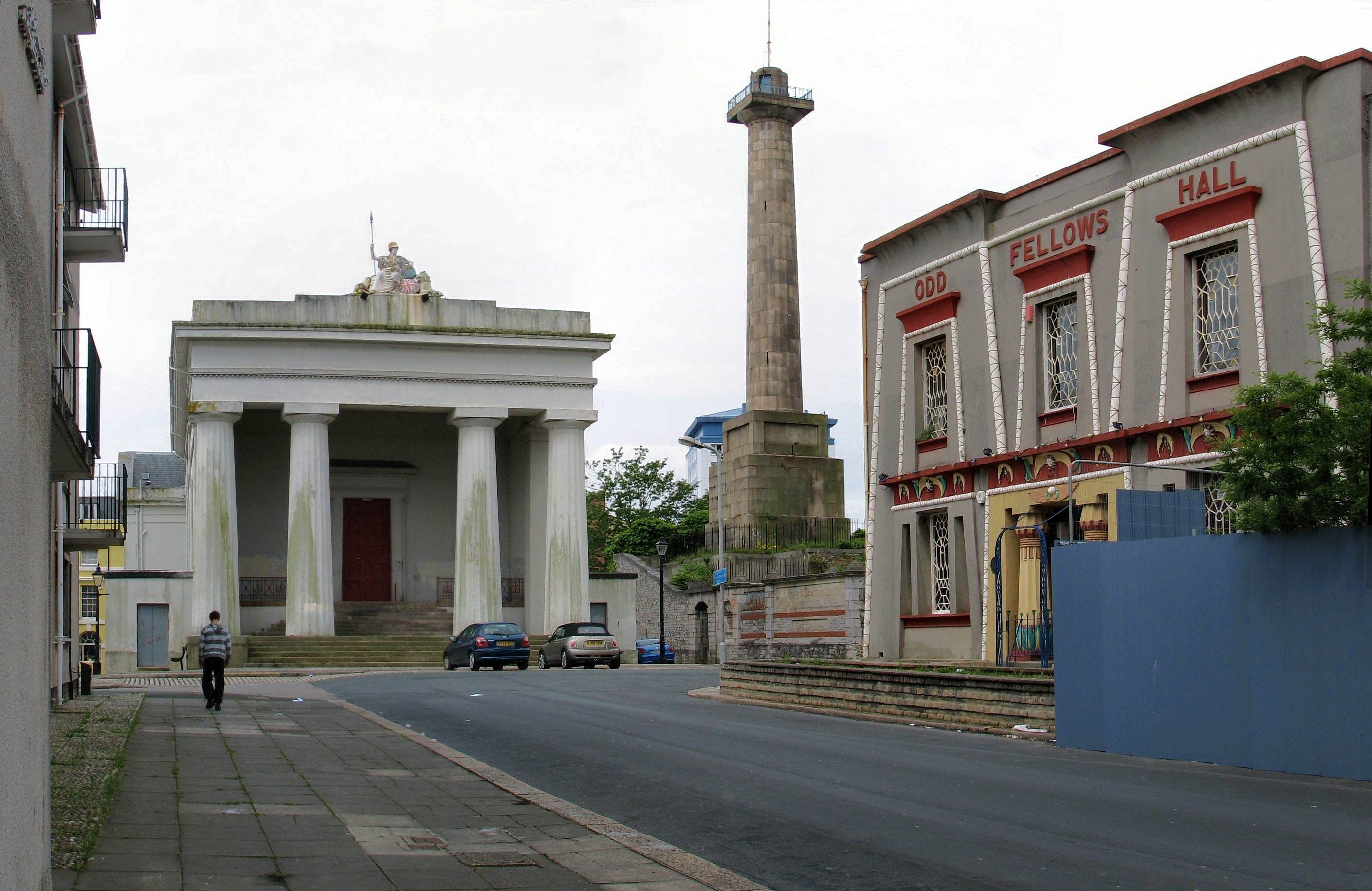
John Foulston's Town Hall, Column and Library in Devonport in 2008

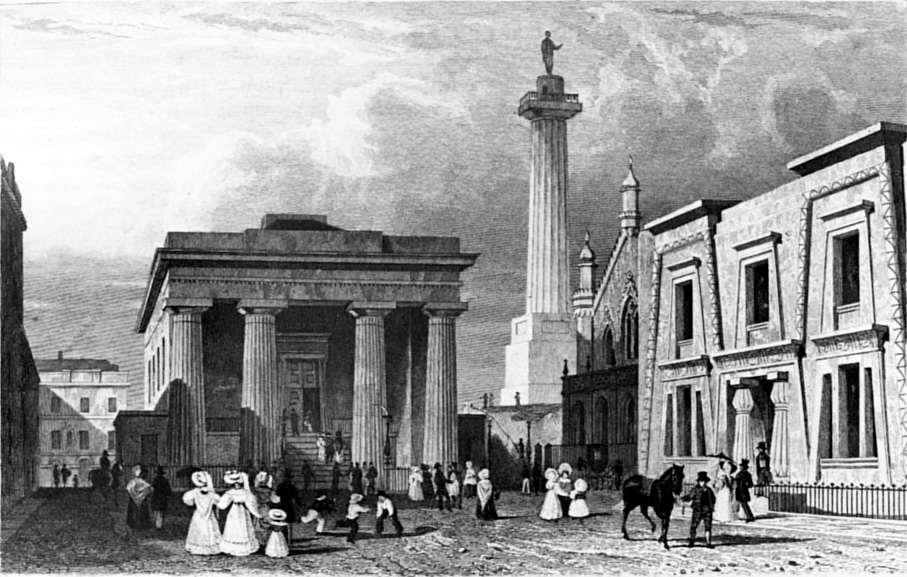
John Foulston's Town Hall, Column and Library in Devonport

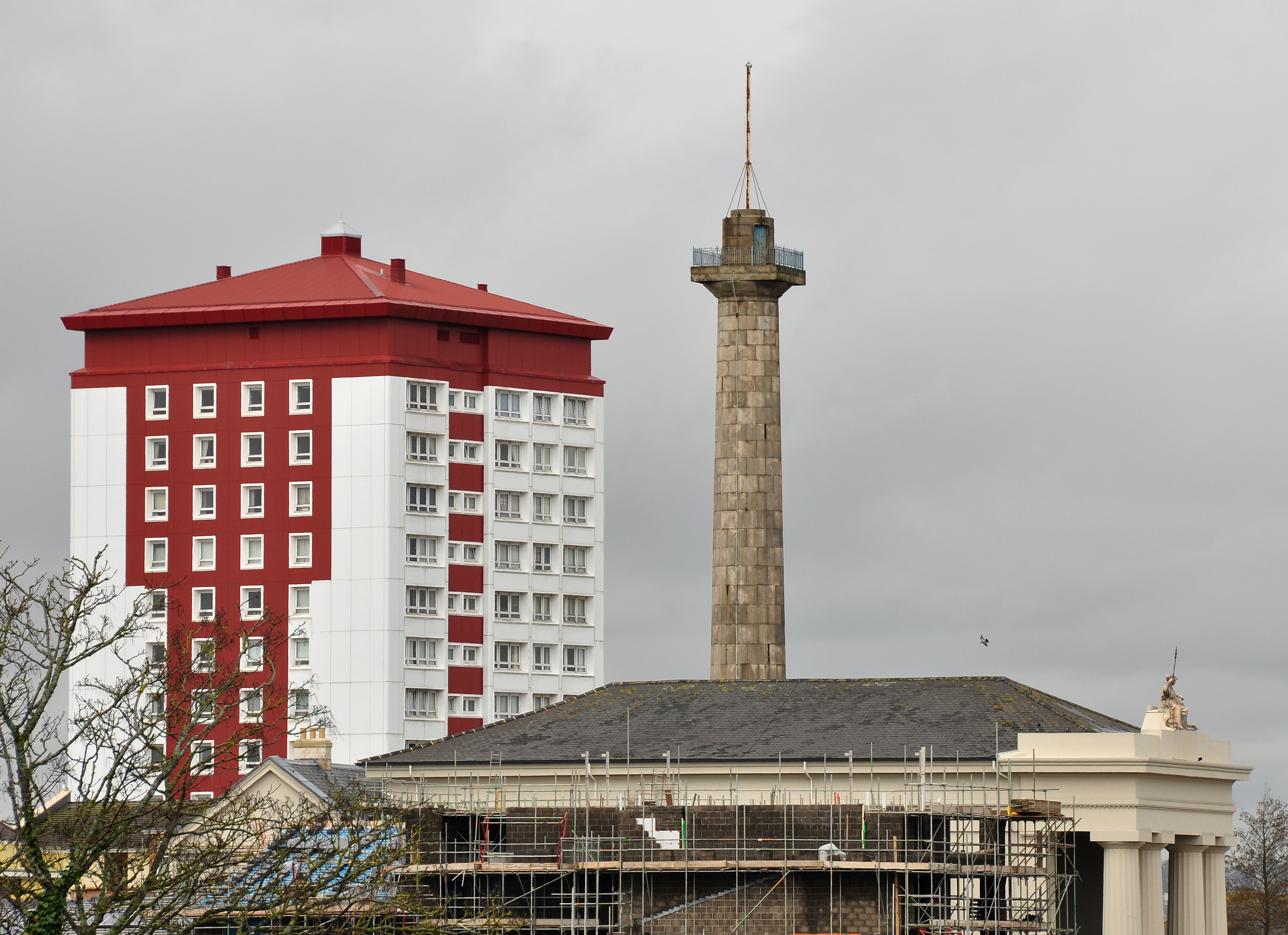
Devonport Column and tower block

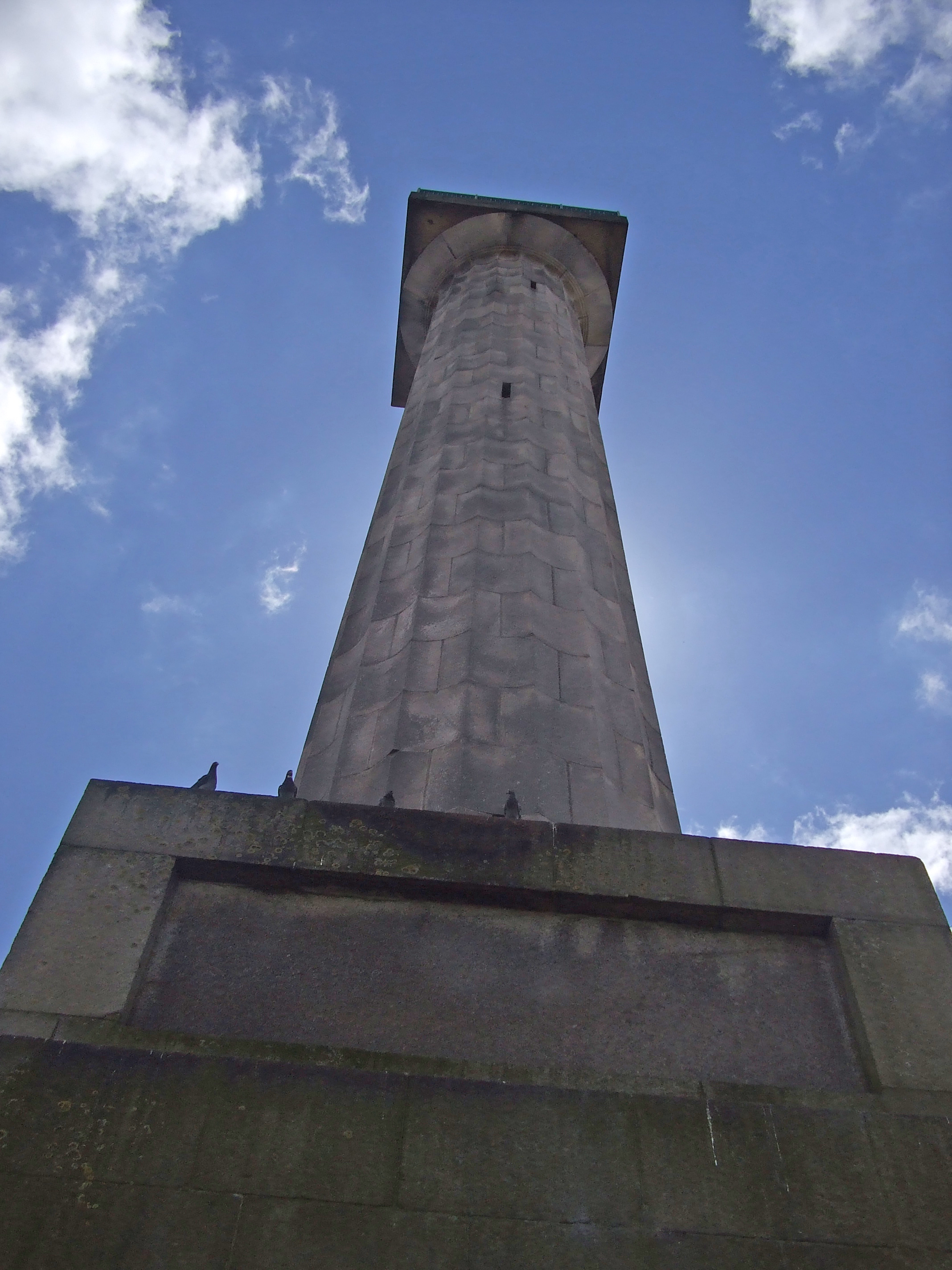
Devonport Column, built 1824

== See also ==
- Grade I listed buildings in Plymouth
