= Smeaton's Tower =

Historic lighthouse in England

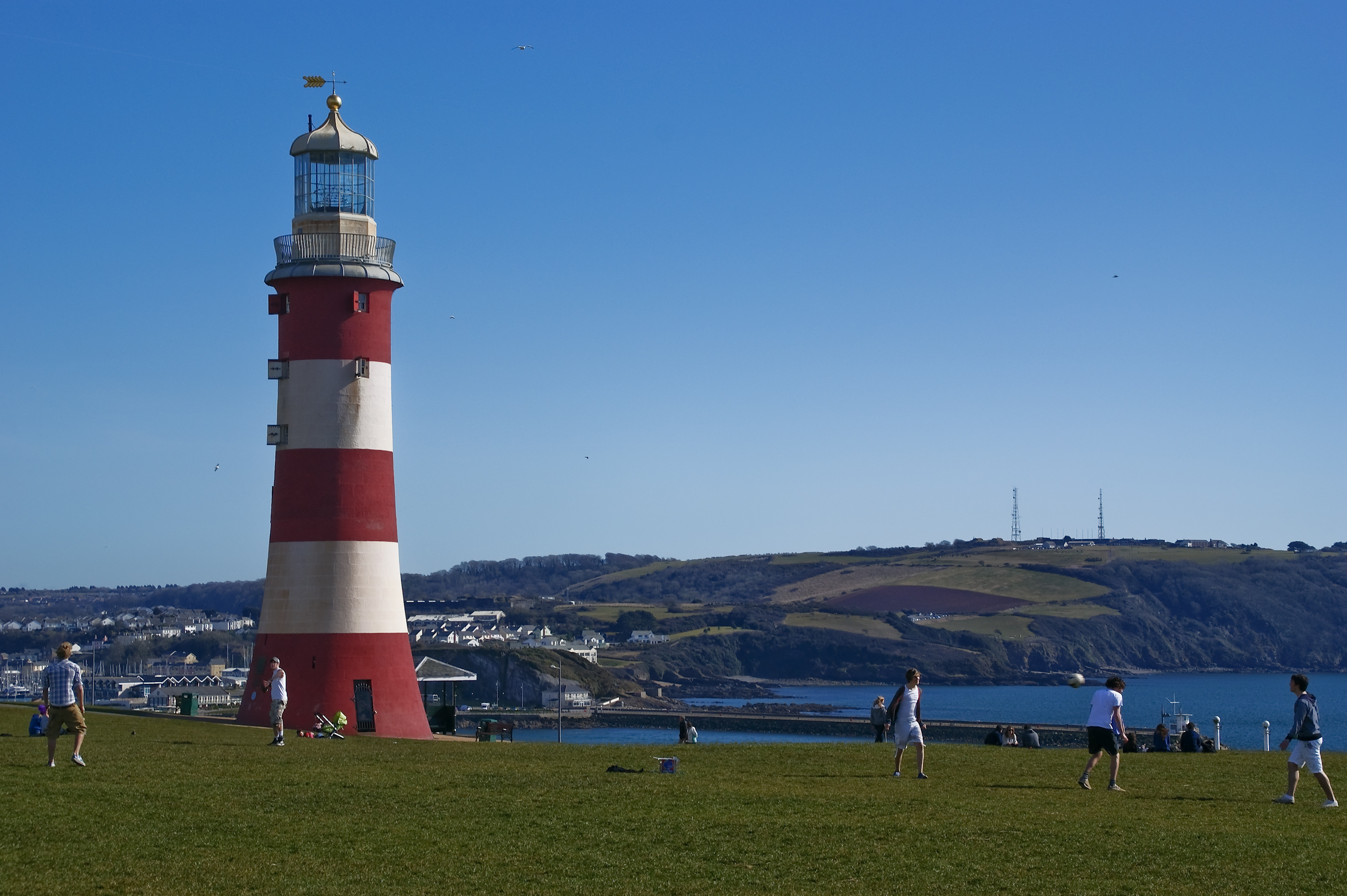
- Interactive map of the Smeaton's Tower area

General information
- Type: former lighthouse and memorial
- Location: The Hoe, Plymouth, England
- Coordinates: 50.36441°N 4.14183°W
- Completed: 1759; reconstructed 1884

Smeaton's Tower is the reconstructed upper section of the third Eddystone Lighthouse, now a memorial to its designer, civil engineer John Smeaton. A major step forward in lighthouse design, Smeaton's structure was in use from 1759 to 1877, until erosion of the ledge it was built upon forced new construction. The tower was largely dismantled and rebuilt on Plymouth Hoe in Plymouth, Devon, where it stands today.

== History ==
=== Background ===
England’s coasts are notorious for rough weather, dangerous seas and deathly obstacles. The Eddystone rocks are among them.

Several attempts were made to place a marker on these reefs. The first attempt was called the Winstanley Lighthouse. After it was destroyed in the 1703 storm, a second one called the Rudyard lighthouse was built. This one was also destroyed, this time by a fire in 1755.

Born in Austhorpe, Yorkshire, England in 1724, John Smeaton is considered the father of civil engineering. He is recognized for his scientific achievements, including the increased efficiency of water wheels.

After the Rudyard lighthouse was destroyed, there was intense pressure to build a third lighthouse quickly. Smeaton was recommended by the Royal Society to design a lighthouse on the Eddystone Rocks in what is considered his greatest achievement.

=== Construction ===
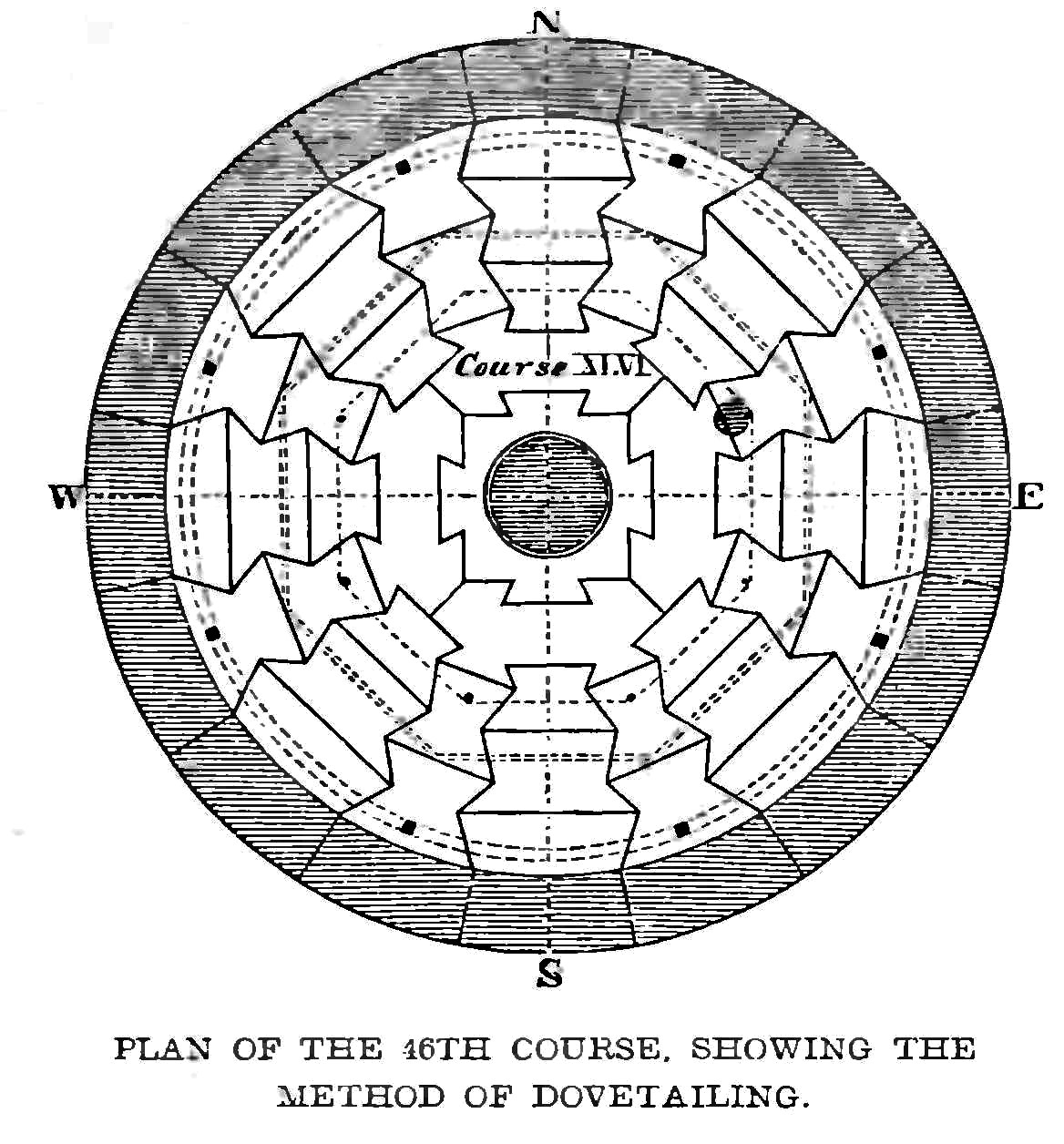
The dovetail design in a cross-section of the lower part of the tower

Smeaton had to build his lighthouse to be strong enough to survive the elements (the first lighthouse was destroyed in a storm). He began by designing his lighthouse to resemble an oak tree. This in itself made the tower into a strong shape.

He rediscovered the use of hydraulic lime, a form of cement used in Roman times. The technique allowed cement to set under water, as Smeaton put granite blocks together using dovetail joints and marble dowels.

Construction started in 1756 at a site in Millbay, where Smeaton built a jetty and a workyard in the south-western corner of the harbour to unload and work on stones. Timber rails of 3 ft 6 in (107 cm) gauge were laid for four-wheeled flat trucks, which were used to move masonry around the site. A 10-ton ship named Eddystone Boat was based here, and transported worked stones out to the reef. The ship carried the 2¼-ton foundation stone out in the morning of 12 June 1756.

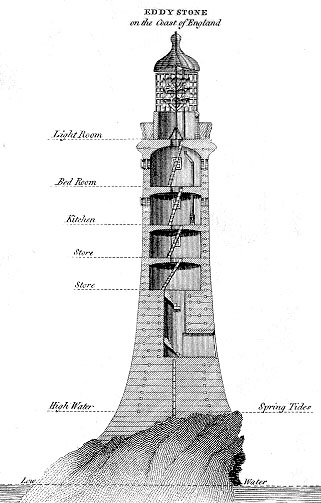
A contemporary engraving of the lighthouse on the Eddystone Reef

The work was completed in August 1759 at a cost of £40,000 (£6,742,643 with inflation).

Many Cornish tin miners were employed in its construction. To avoid the possibility of press ganging, a practice which was common at the time, Trinity House arranged with the Admiralty that the workers would be immune from the press. Each worker was issued a medal to confirm he was a worker at the lighthouse.

The lighthouse was 72 feet (22 m) in height, and had a diameter at the base of 26 feet (8 m) and at the top of 17 feet (5 m).

=== As lighthouse ===
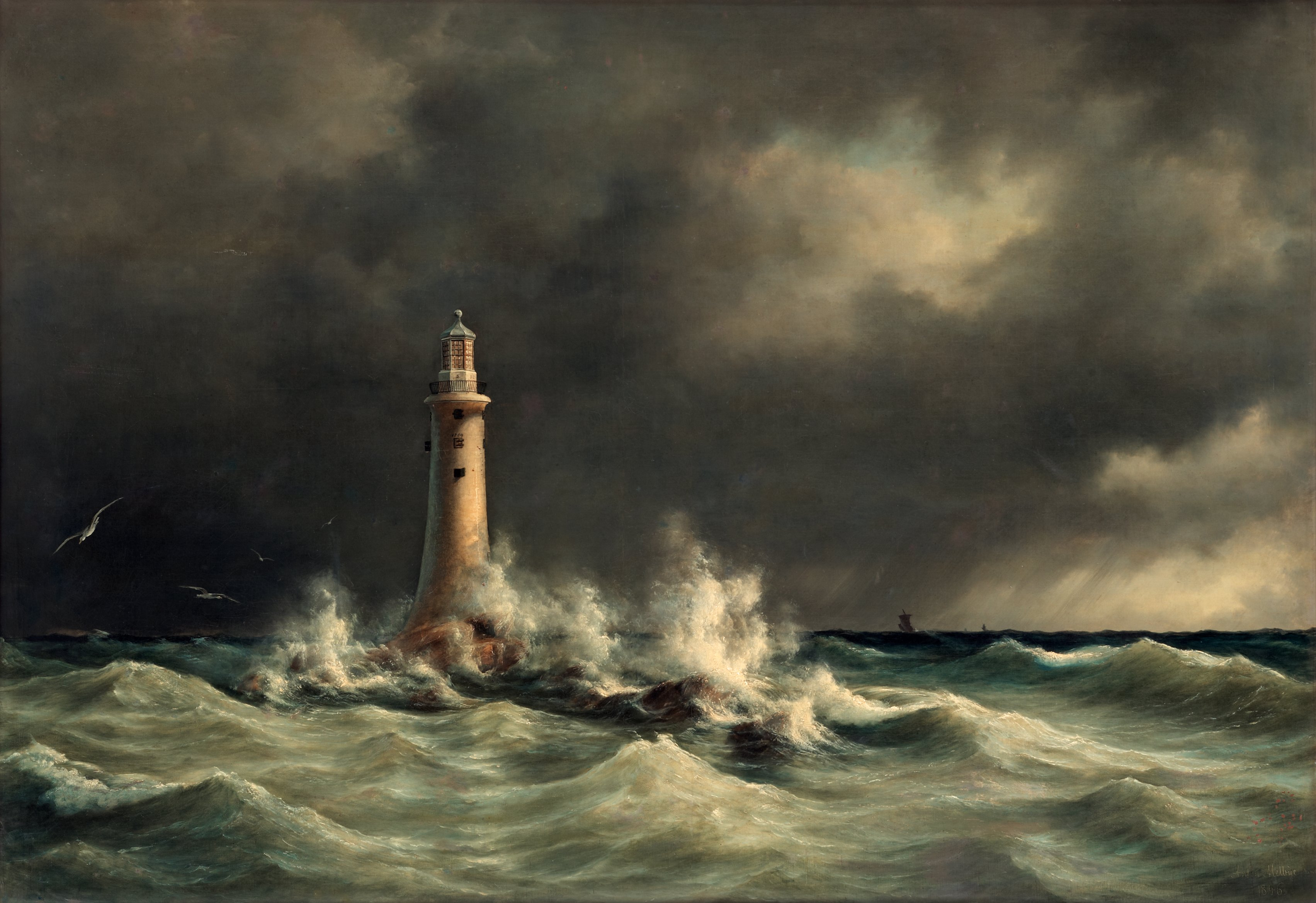
Painting by Anton Melbye, 1846

After the structure was completed, the lighthouse's 24 candles were lit on 16 October 1759. Each candle weighed between 2 and 5 pounds (0.91 and 2.27 kg; 910 and 2,270 g). A timepiece placed alongside the light was set to chime every half-hour (30 min), alerting the lighthouse keeper to the need to replace expired candles.

The lighthouse candles were replaced by oil lamps and reflectors from 1810. Further major renovations were carried out in 1841 by engineer Henry Norris, including the filling of a hole in the rock close to the tower's foundation. Four years later, the oil lamps and reflectors were replaced with an improved lamp and Fresnel lens assembly.

The lighthouse remained in use until 1877, when it was discovered that rocks upon which it stood were becoming eroded. Each time a large wave hit, the lighthouse shook from side to side.

=== As memorial ===
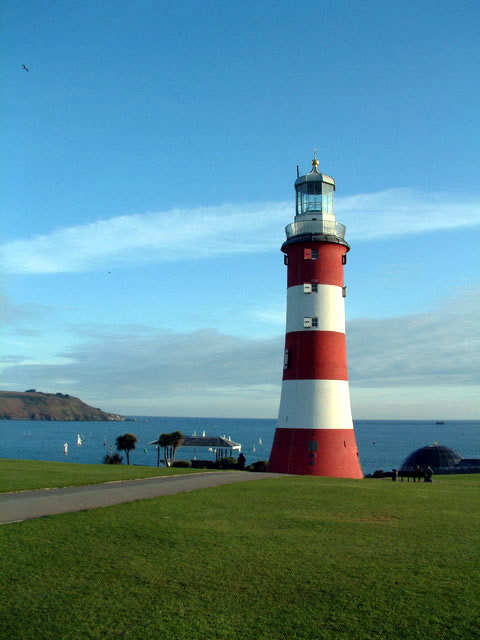
Smeaton's Lighthouse on Plymouth Hoe

Smeaton's Tower ceased operation in February 1882 following the installation of a temporary light atop its successor (Douglass's Tower), then under construction on an adjacent rock. In 1882, the upper part of Smeaton's Tower was dismantled and rebuilt as a memorial to Smeaton on a new base on Plymouth Hoe, replacing the triangular obelisk that had been built there by Trinity House as a navigation aid in the early 19th century.

The site was opened to the public by the Mayor of Plymouth on 24 September 1884.

The foundation and stub of the old tower remain on Eddystone Rocks, close to the current lighthouse. Since the foundation proved too strong to be dismantled, it was left where it stood. In 1860, a new penny coin was brought into circulation on which the lighthouse was depicted in the background behind Britannia, remaining on the penny until 1894. The lighthouse was also depicted on a number of tokens issued during the 19th century in Devon with face values from two pence to one shilling.

An 1850 replica of Smeaton's lighthouse, Hoad Monument, still stands above the town of Ulverston, Cumbria as a memorial to naval administrator Sir John Barrow.

On 19 April 1913 a home-made bomb with the words 'votes for women' and 'death in ten minutes' painted on the outside was found in the entrance to Smeaton's Tower, presumably as part of the campaign for women's suffrage. The wick had been lit but blew out in the wind, preventing detonation.

Smeaton's Tower has been a Grade I-listed building since 1954. It is open for visitors, who may climb 93 steps, including steep ladders, to the lantern room, and observe Plymouth Sound and the city.

On 15 October 2009, as part of a celebration organised by the Institution of Civil Engineers, the lantern of Smeaton's Tower was once again lit with 24 candles to mark the 250th anniversary of the lighthouse's first illumination.

In 2020 a Cornish granite bust of Smeaton by Philip Chatfield, commissioned by The Box, Plymouth and funded by Trinity House, was installed in the tower's lantern chamber before its reopening. The bust is based on a plaster one donated by the Institution of Civil Engineers in about 1980, but later removed for safety reasons.

== Gallery ==
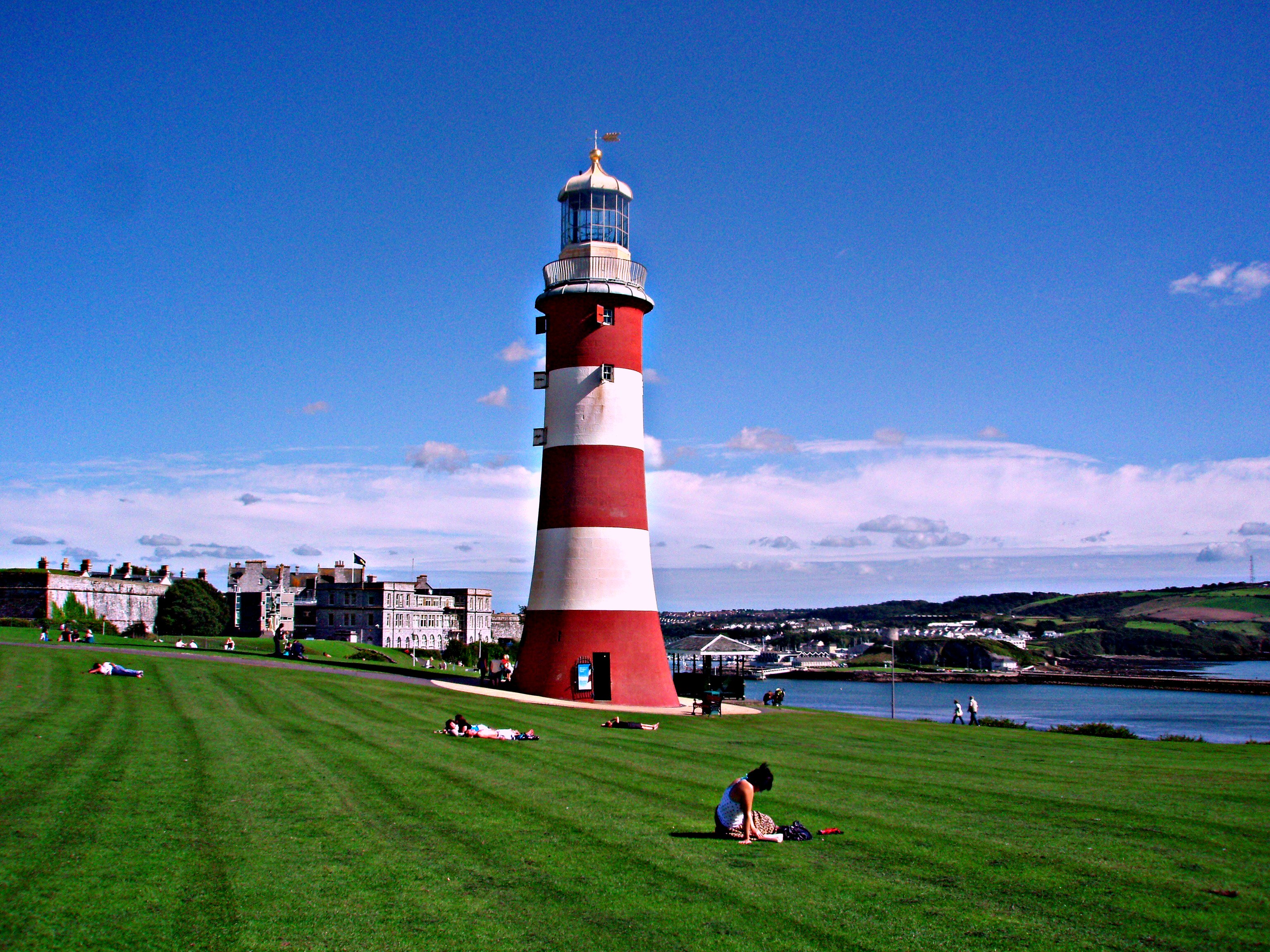
Smeaton's Tower on Plymouth Hoe

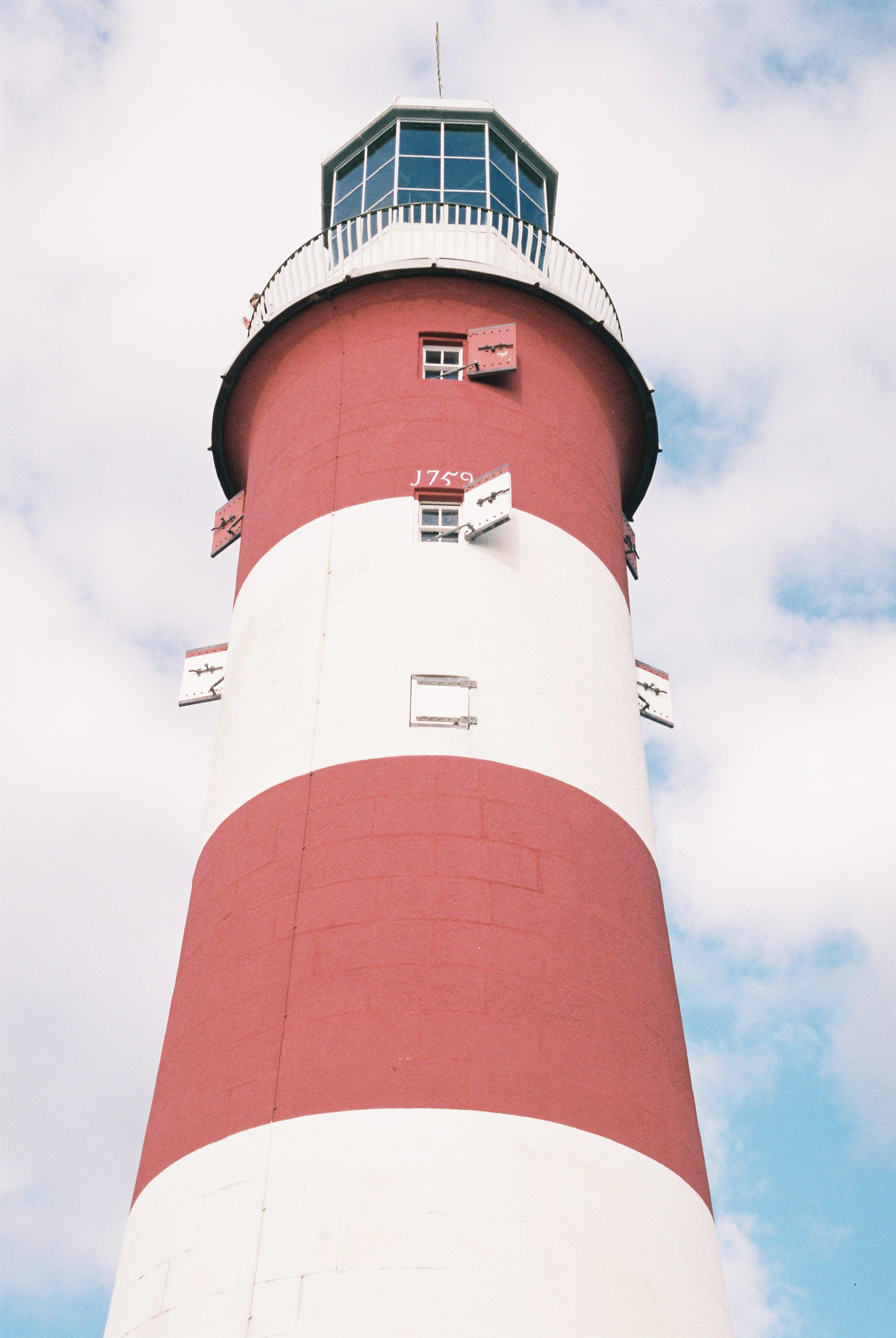
Close-up of the tower

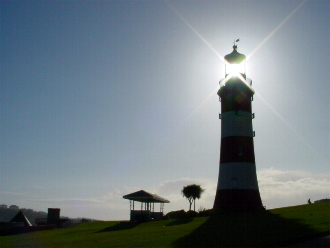
Sunlight through the lantern room

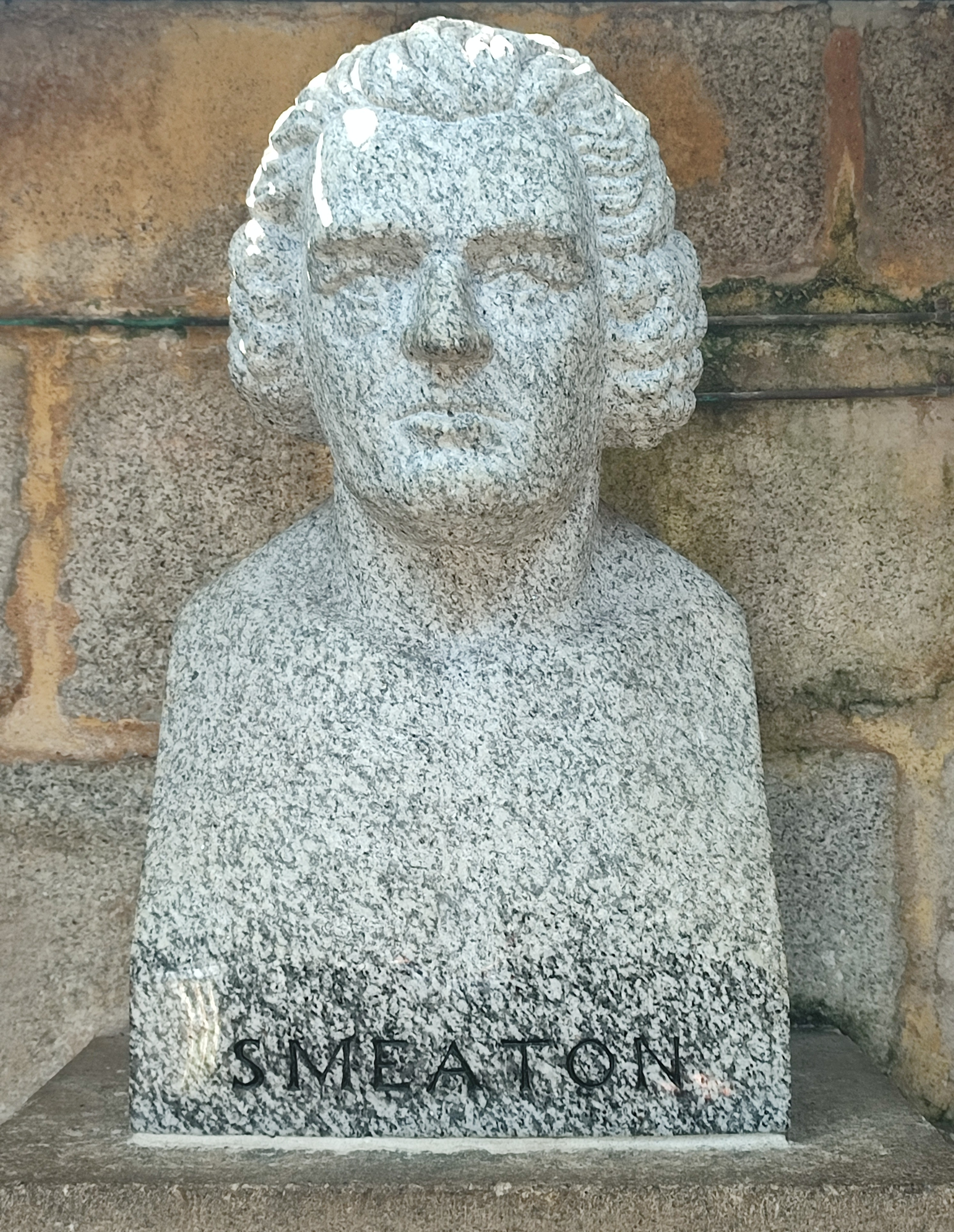
Granite bust by Philip Chatfield in the tower's lantern chamber

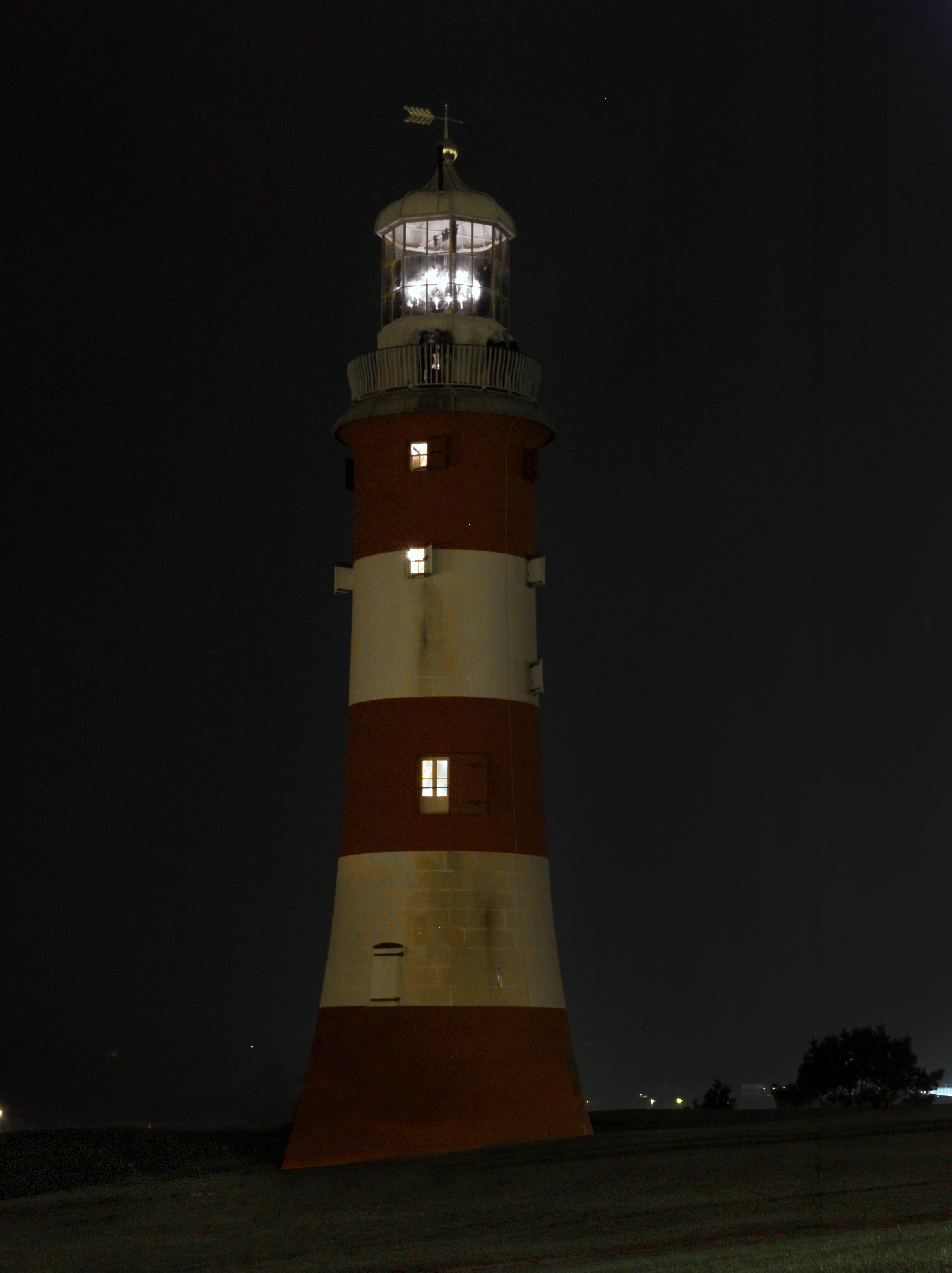
The tower lit by candles in 2009 to mark its 250th anniversary

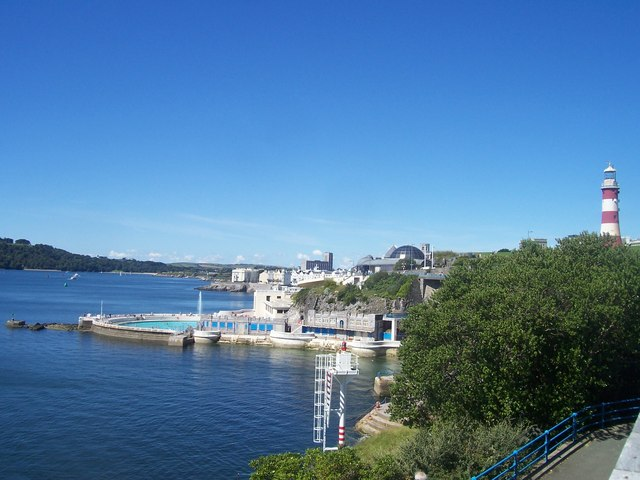
Tinside Pool, Plymouth Sound

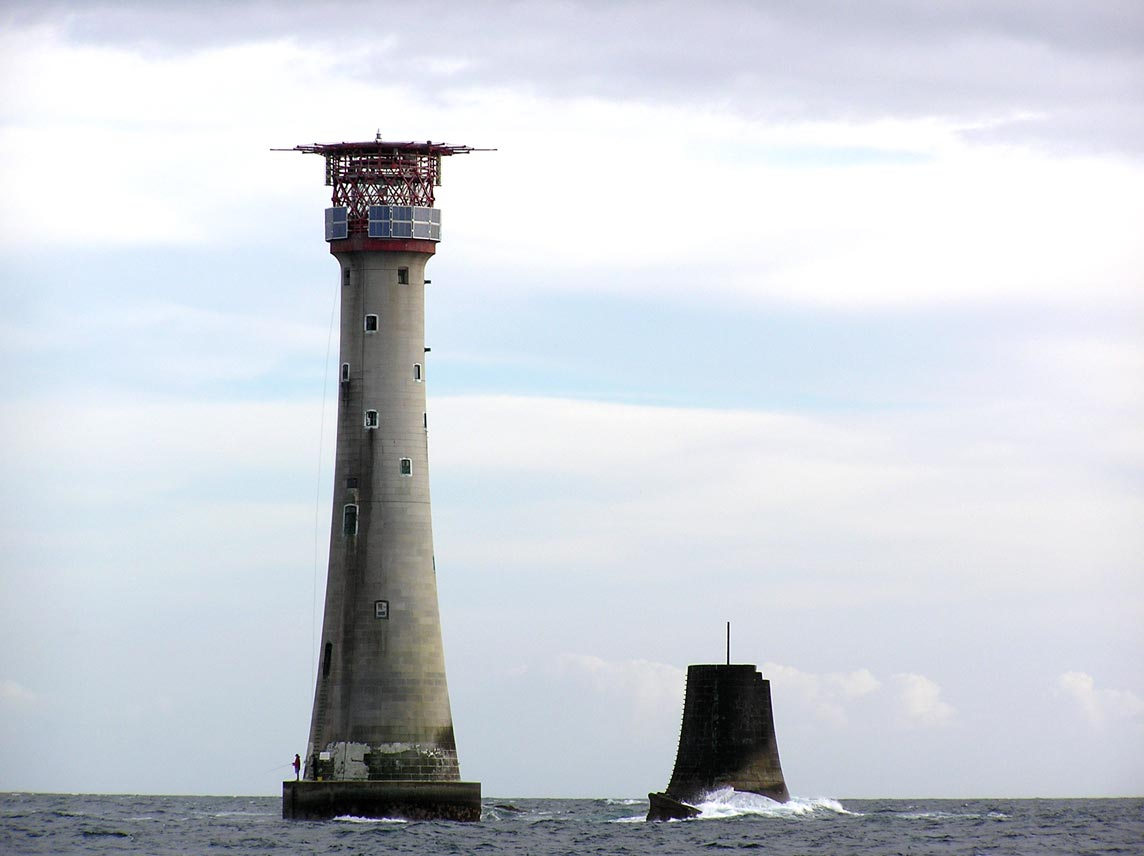
The original base of Smeaton's Tower still in position next to the current Eddystone Lighthouse

== See also ==
- List of lighthouses in England
- Grade I listed buildings in Plymouth
