= Osborne Peasgood =

Organist (1902–1962)

Osborne Harold Peasgood CVO (5 March 1902 – 25 January 1962) was an organist at Westminster Abbey who played at a number of state occasions in the Abbey, including the Coronation of Queen Elizabeth II.

Peasgood was born in London on 5 March 1902 and gained a scholarship to the Royal College of Music when he was 17. He became a Fellow of the Royal College of Organists in 1926 followed by a doctorate at Dublin in 1936. Peasgood taught the organ at the Royal College of Music and had become sub-organist at Westminster Abbey from 1924.

Peasgood also composed two services and from Handel's Water Music, he published an edition of a suite for the organ.

== Portrayals ==
Peasgood was portrayed by Robert Daws in Sarah Wooley's audio drama People Everywhere Will Sing, which was broadcast on BBC Radio 3 in 2022.

== See also ==
- List of Westminster Abbey organists
