= Devonport, Plymouth =

District of Plymouth, England

Coordinates: 50.377°N 4.176°W

Devonport
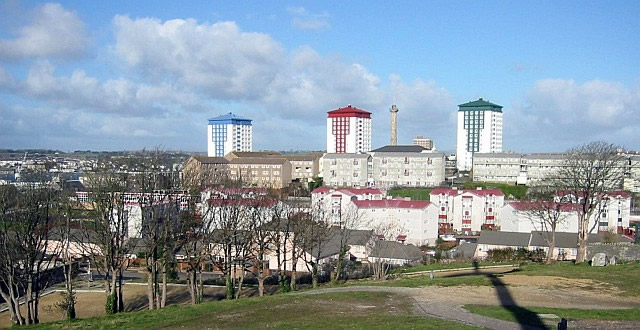
- Devonport skyline

- Location within Devon
- OS grid reference: SX455547
- Unitary authority: Plymouth
- Ceremonial county: Devon
- Region: South West
- Country: England
- Sovereign state: United Kingdom
- Post town: PLYMOUTH
- Postcode district: PL1
- Dialling code: 01752
- Police: Devon and Cornwall
- Fire: Devon and Somerset
- Ambulance: South Western
- UK Parliament: Plymouth Sutton Devonport

Devonport (UK: /ˈdɛvənpɔːt/ DEV-ən-pot, US: /ˈdɛvənpɔːrt/ DEV-ən-port) formerly named Plymouth Dock or just Dock, is a district of Plymouth in the county of Devon, England. Becoming a county borough in 1888, Devonport was originally one of the "Three Towns" (along with Plymouth and East Stonehouse) that merged to form what would eventually become the City of Plymouth in 1928. It is represented in the Parliament of the United Kingdom as part of the Plymouth Sutton and Devonport constituency. Its elected Member of Parliament (MP) is Luke Pollard, who is a member of the Labour and Co-operative Party. The population of the ward at the 2011 census was 14,788.

== History ==
=== Plymouth Dock ===
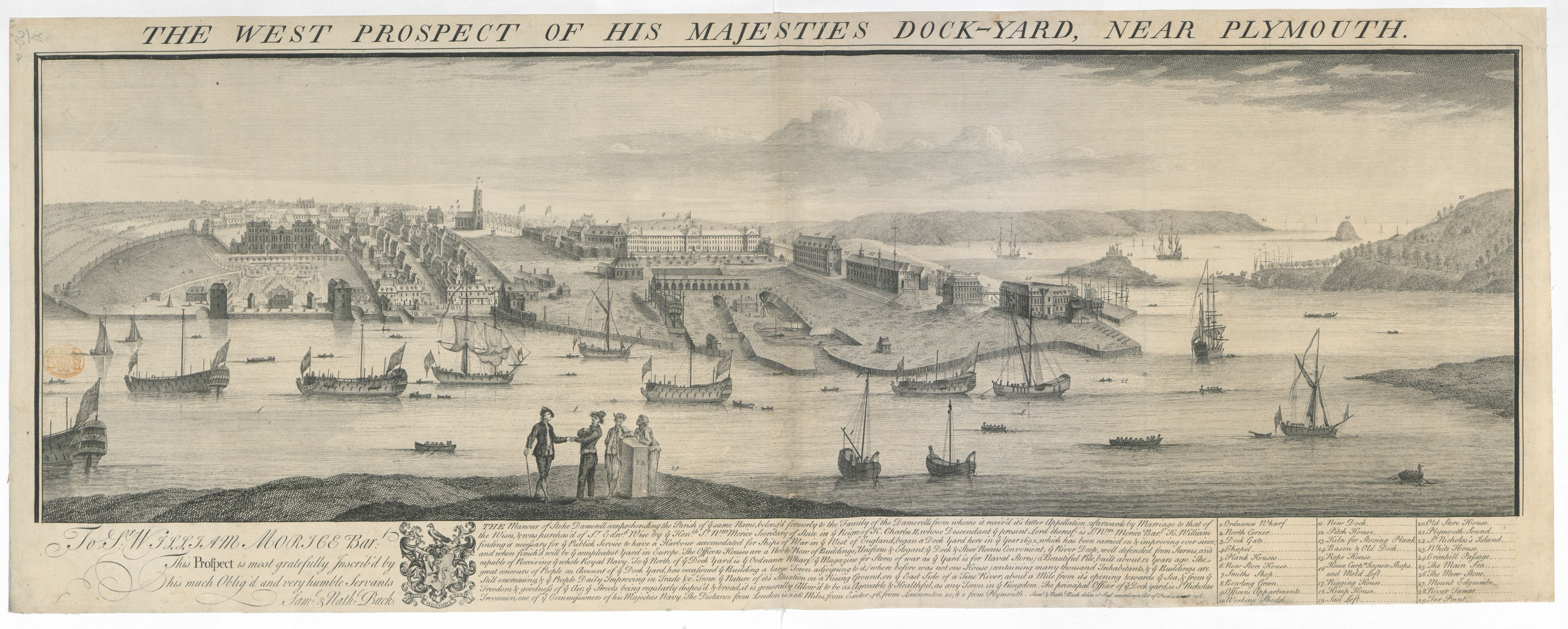
View of Plymouth Dockyard in 1736 (by Samuel and Nathaniel Buck).

In 1690 the Admiralty gave a contract to Robert Waters from Portsmouth to build a stone dock at Point Froward on the east bank of the Hamoaze at the mouth of the River Tamar. Plymouth Dock, as Devonport was originally called, was founded around 1700 as a small settlement to house workers employed on the new naval base that was being built around Waters' dock. By 1733 its population had grown to around 3,000 and, by 1801, it was already larger than both the nearby towns of Plymouth and Stonehouse put together.

=== Devonport ===
By 1811 the population of Plymouth Dock was just over 30,000, and the residents resented the fact that its name made it sound like an adjunct of Plymouth. In 1823 a petition to King George IV requested the town be renamed, and suggesting "Devonport" as a suitable alternative. The King agreed to the change, which took effect on 1 January 1824. To celebrate, the town built Devonport Column next to the recently completed guildhall; both were designed by John Foulston. Devonport was first incorporated as a municipal borough in 1837 under the Municipal Corporations Act 1835. The 1841 census lists a population of 33,830 inhabitants.

In July 1849, the first outbreaks in what became a cholera epidemic arose on Union Street which connected Plymouth to Devonport, and were initially attributed to the blockage of several house drains during the construction of the new Millbay railway station. Devonport became a county borough under the Local Government Act 1888, but it and the neighbouring urban district of East Stonehouse were later absorbed into the county borough of Plymouth. On 1 April 1974, the parish was abolished and merged with Plymouth. At the 1951 census (the last before the abolition of the parish), Devonport had a population of 72,738.

=== Dockyard defences ===
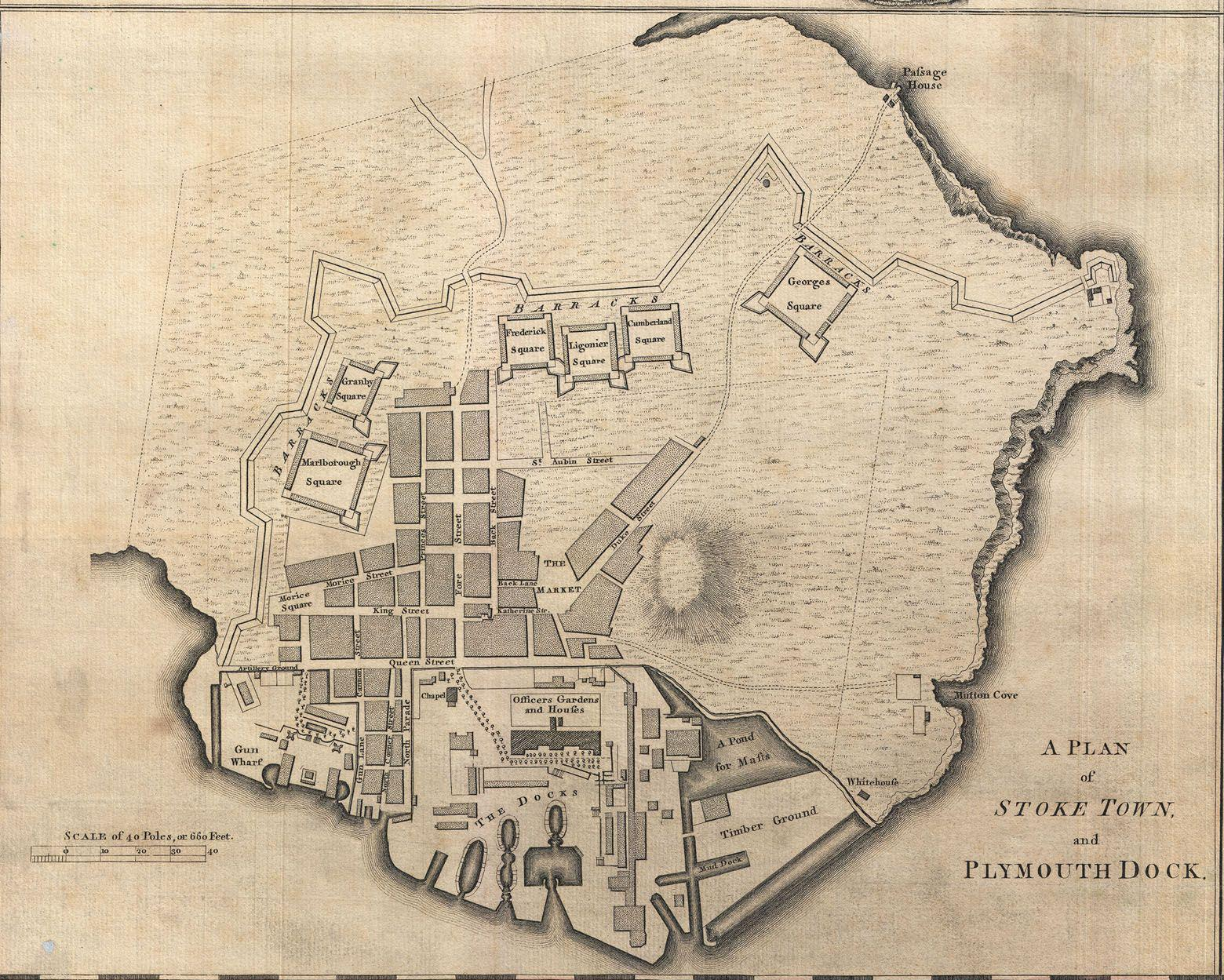
Plymouth Dock, 1765: the town is shown encompassed by the ordnance wharf and dockyard to the west, by the defensive 'lines' and square barracks to the north and east, and by Mount Wise to the south. NB North = left.

In the mid-eighteenth century, a defensive earthwork was constructed around the town and dockyard. Within these dockyard 'lines', six square barracks were built between 1758 and 1763 to accommodate the garrison of troops required to man the defences. A series of redoubts were also constructed in front of the lines in the 1770s, including that at Mount Pleasant (of which there are substantial remains). In the early nineteenth century, the dockyard lines were strengthened with stone ramparts and armed with guns, and the adjacent ditches were deepened. These defences became largely redundant with the building of a series of Palmerston Forts around Plymouth in the second half of the nineteenth century. Much of the open land forming the glacis beyond the lines became Devonport Park in the late 1850s. Three of the six small barracks were replaced in 1854–6 by the sizeable Raglan Infantry Barracks, designed by Captain Francis Fowke (who later designed the Albert Hall); today only its gatehouse remains (and that in a derelict state), the rest having been demolished in the 1970s.

=== Mount Wise ===
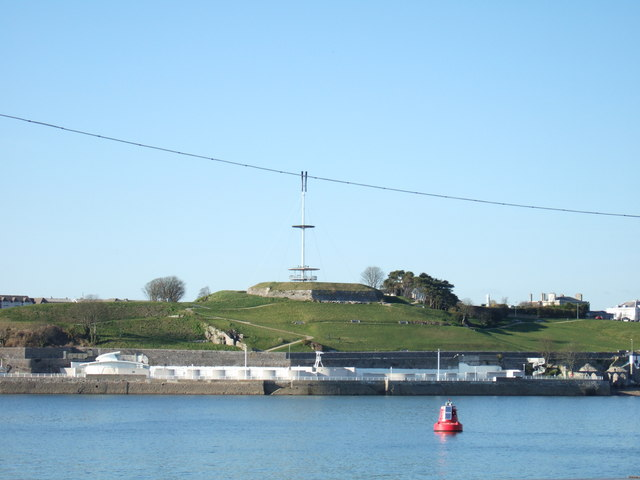
Mount Wise: the modern viewing platform and mast atop the old redoubt

The high ground south of the town is called Mount Wise. Enclosed within the town ramparts, it was given its own redoubt in the 1770s, with eight guns and two mortars protecting the coastal approach to the dockyard. In earlier times, a gun wharf had been established on the quayside to the south-east, but this was removed and re-established at Morice Yard alongside the Dockyard in 1724. From the late-eighteenth/early-nineteenth century both the military Governor and naval Commander-in-Chief of Plymouth were accommodated in large houses on Mount Wise (in Government House and Admiralty House respectively). In 1805 a Royal Laboratory (an outpost of the Woolwich Arsenal) was established just north-west of the redoubt, small-arms where ammunition and explosives were manufactured until the compound was converted into barracks accommodation (Mount Wise Barracks) in the 1830s.

== 21st-century Devonport ==
During the millennium decade, Devonport received government New Deal for Communities funding of £48.7 million, which enabled an extensive Regeneration programme to be carried out. Since 2009, the investments have been used to transform Devonport physically, socially, and demographically. Where once the area was run-down, depressed, and classified as 'deprived' in many categories, the 21st-century Devonport is beginning to achieve the city's vision of being "a distinct place in modern Plymouth; a vibrant self-sustaining community; a place of real quality, variety and interest, the pride of residents, attractive to visitors and a model of 21st Century living, working and playing."

The Admiralty's release of several land plots in Devonport has assisted the Regeneration project. One ex-MoD area, the Admiralty House site at Mount Wise, is earmarked for residential property development. Notably, the waterfront district of Devonport is quickly becoming one of the most desired residential areas of the city of Plymouth.

In 2011, the Devonport Heritage Trail was introduced, complete with over 70 waymarkers outlining the route.

== Facilities ==
Devonport has its own high street, a railway station, a swimming pool, park, and sports ground, The Brickfields. Since 2003, it has been the home of Plymouth Albion, the city's Rugby union club located near Plymouth City College.

Devonport is also home to the Devonport Playhouse, a theatre located in the former Methodist Central Hall in Fore Street. The space was purchased and converted into a performance venue by the Plymouth Theatre Company in 1987. It is a popular venue with local Amateur Dramatic companies, choirs and dancing schools, especially since the closure of the Athenaeum in central Plymouth.

Devonport is also home to UTC Plymouth, a university technical college (UTC) which opened in September 2013 near Devonport Park. It is situated on the former site of Parkside Community College, which closed in August 2008 due to falling enrolment.

The Torpoint Ferry service across the Hamoaze (River Tamar) operates from Devonport to Cornwall.

Devonport Naval Base has, over the years, been known as "Guz" by naval ratings. There are various explanations for the nickname: the Royal Naval Museum says it is short for Guzzle and refers to Devon cream teas.

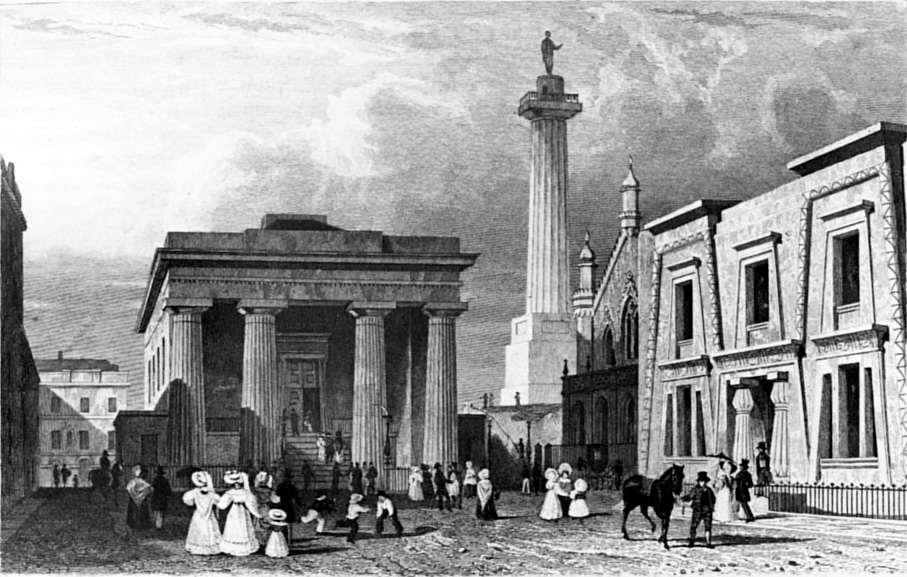
Engraving circa 1825 of John Foulston's Town Hall, Column and Egyptian Revival Library

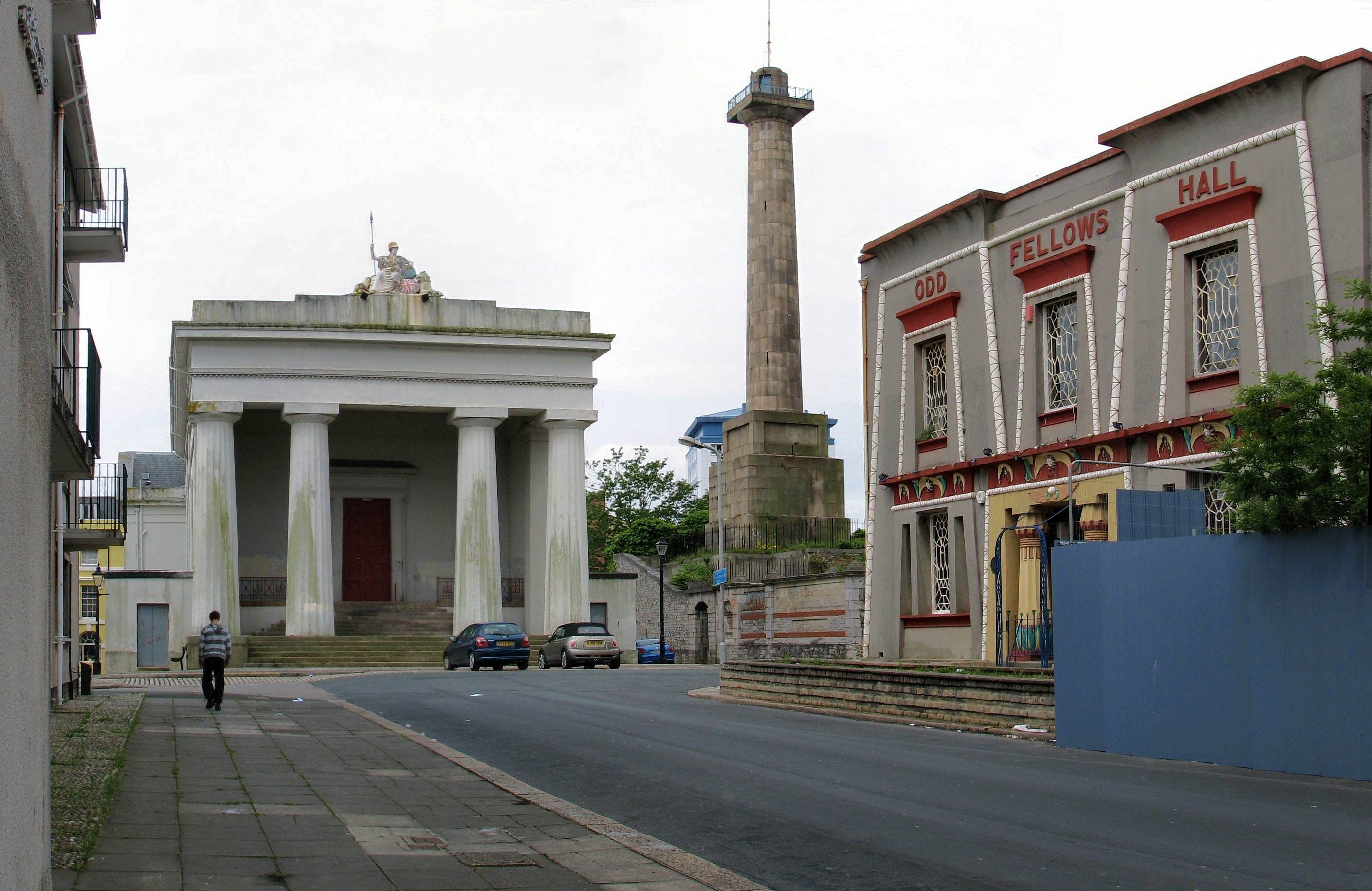
Devonport's town hall and column in 2008

== Notable People ==
- R. F. Scott (1868–1912, Antarctica) British naval officer and explorer, born Devonport, led the heroic but ill-fated second expedition in 1910 to reach the South Pole.
- N. T. Carrington (1777–1830), schoolmaster and poet.
- Charles Mathews, theatre manager and comic actor, lived here for several months before his death in 1835.
- Leslie Hore-Belisha, 1st Baron Hore-Belisha (1893–1957) was born in Devonport. In the 1945 general election he stood for the seat as a National Independent candidate, but was defeated by Michael Foot. In 1954 he was elevated to the peerage as Baron Hore-Belisha, of Devonport in the County of Devon.
- Ralph Alger Bagnold (1896–1990) was born here. He was a pioneer of desert exploration, and was the founder and first commander of the British Army's Long Range Desert Group. He also made significant contributions to the scientific understanding of desert structures.
- Guy Burgess (1911–1963), one of the Cambridge Five spy ring that betrayed Western secrets to the Soviets before and during the Cold War, was born here.

Charles Darwin spent two months in Devonport from October 1831 waiting for the weather to improve so that HMS Beagle could begin its journey to South America. The ship finally left on 27 December and Darwin later wrote that those two months were "the most miserable which I ever spent".

== General and cited references ==
- "Devonport" . Encyclopædia Britannica. Vol. VII (9th ed.). 1878. pp. 138–139.
- Gill, Crispin (1993). Plymouth: A New History. Devon Books. ISBN 0-86114-882-7.
