= Three Towns =

Term used to refer to groups of towns

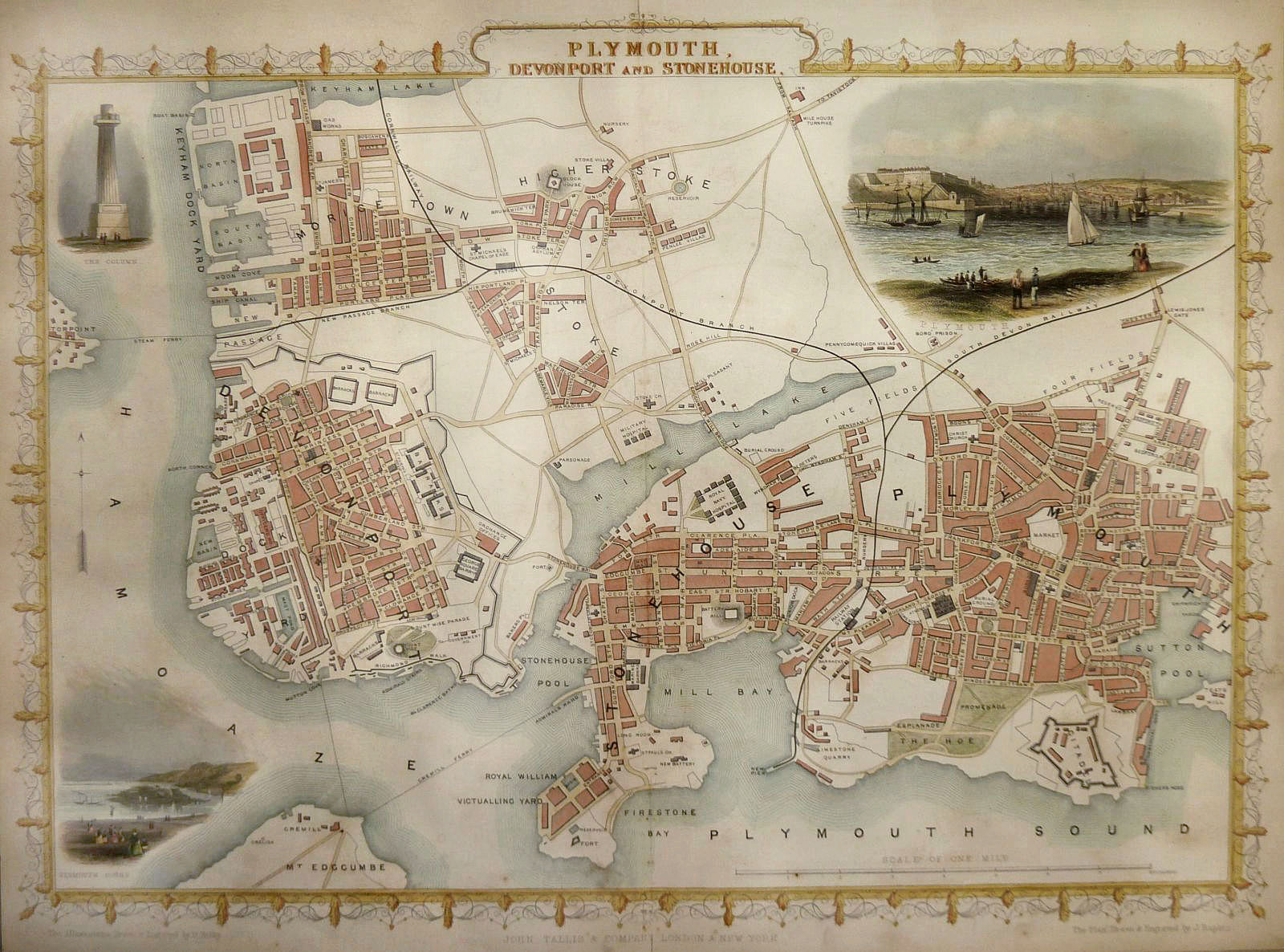
Map of c.1854 showing the Three Towns: Devonport with its defences to the left, Stonehouse in the centre, Plymouth to the right

Three Towns is a term used to refer to several groups of towns.

== United Kingdom ==
There are several groups of towns in the United Kingdom referred to as the Three Towns, many of which form contiguous settlements, or are near to each other.

=== England ===
==== Devon ====
The Three Towns is a term used to refer to the neighbouring towns of Plymouth, Devonport and East Stonehouse in the county of Devon, England. They were formally merged in 1914 to become the Borough of Plymouth. In 1928, the Borough was granted City status by royal charter.

==== Dorset ====
Three towns has been used to refer to the towns of Bournemouth, Christchurch and Poole in South-East Dorset, which form a single conurbation. The name was used to refer to an infrastructure project in the area, which became a single authority in 2019 called Bournemouth, Christchurch and Poole. One of the parties which stood for the inaugural elections was initially called Three Towns Together.

==== Lancashire ====
The term is also sometimes used to refer to the towns of Great Harwood, Clayton-le-Moors and Rishton, situated to the north of Accrington in the Hyndburn district of Lancashire.

=== Scotland ===
The term 'three towns' is also used in reference to the towns of Ardrossan, Saltcoats and Stevenston in North Ayrshire (historically Cunninghame) which together form one contiguous settlement along the eastern shore of the Firth of Clyde with a population of around 32,000; most local amenities are shared across the localities.

== Sudan ==
In Sudan, the term "Three Towns" refers to Khartoum, North Khartoum, and Omdurman.

== Poland ==
The term 'three cities' (more commonly: Tricity, Polish: Trójmiasto) is used for the metropolitan area of Gdańsk, Gdynia and Sopot on the Baltic Coastline (as well as minor towns in their vicinity). Their total metropolitan population amounts to around 1,100,000.
