= Plymouth Bone Caves =

- Entrances list: Cattedown; Stonehouse; Turnchapel; Oreston
- Access: Limited to scientific research only

The Plymouth Bone Caves are a chain of caves and caverns underneath and around Plymouth, Devon, England, that contain fossilised remains of human and animal bones. The exact location and entrances of some of the caves are kept secret, and access to them is limited.

== Caves ==
=== Cattedown ===
In 1816, caves containing human bones were discovered 50 metres (160 ft) below sea level in Cattedown near the modern-day Shapners Way when a "bone bearing fissure" was found by a "Mr Whidbey", the caves were further discovered and excavated by two archaeologists in 1886 who discovered human bones while mining in a quarry. During the excavations traces of charcoal were found, leading archeologists to believe that early humans were living in the caves, and were potentially the first people to live in the Plymouth area. Bones of woolly rhinoceroses, reindeer, hyenas and a woolly mammoth from the ice age were also found.

Among the partial skeletons of 15 early humans found in the caves was the famous ‘Cattedown Man’ – believed to be the city's earliest known inhabitant and dating back 140,000 years. Archaeologists say he could potentially be the oldest human found in Britain.

Today, the caves – listed as a national monument by Historic England – remain fenced off and closed to the public.

The land surrounding the caves is owned by Chevron Corporation. There were plans to turn the caves into a tourist attraction in the 2010s, but the current status of the plans are unknown.

=== Stonehouse ===
Whilst now flattened, Stonehouse used to be a large hill. This hill contained a number of caves, many of which were used for prison escapes from the jail situated in the area. Whilst the hill was being quarried out the caves were found and investigated.

In 1835, caves containing fossilised bones were discovered in Stonehouse. The caves were further investigated from 1879 to 1882. Fossilised remains of rhinoceros, red deer, ox, horse, and donkey as well as human teeth were found at the caves in Stonehouse.

=== Turnchapel ===
The Turnchapel Bone Cave was discovered in March 1978 during an investigation by the Devon Karst Research Society of all limestone quarry faces in the area. Following the discovery, the society photographed and cleared the area. Researchers from Southampton University visited the site in 1978–79, but were later refused reentry by the landowner after creating a large mess around the area. Following a change of land ownership, permission to access the cave was revoked for privacy reasons.

=== Oreston ===
In 1816 the bone cave was discovered in Oreston. At the time this was the first bone cave in England which was investigated in a scientific enquiry. In November 1816, the teeth of rhinoceros, black or brown bear, and an "animal of deer kind" as well as bones from an unknown animal described as roughly the size of a bear were found embedded in clay in perfect condition. The cavern they were found in was 160 feet inside the hill, and required 60 feet of blasting and 100 feet of manual material removal.

It was also estimated that human bone from the Mesolithic period may have been found at the location.

== Preservation ==
The Devon Karst Research Society who survey and report on the condition of the caves criticised Plymouth City Council for the "destruction" of the caves at Stonehouse, and shared that the caves at Cattedown have "suffered". The current state of the caves is unknown.
