= Victoria Park, Plymouth =

Park in Millbridge, Plymouth, England

Coordinates: 50°22′29.71″N 4°9′20.45″W

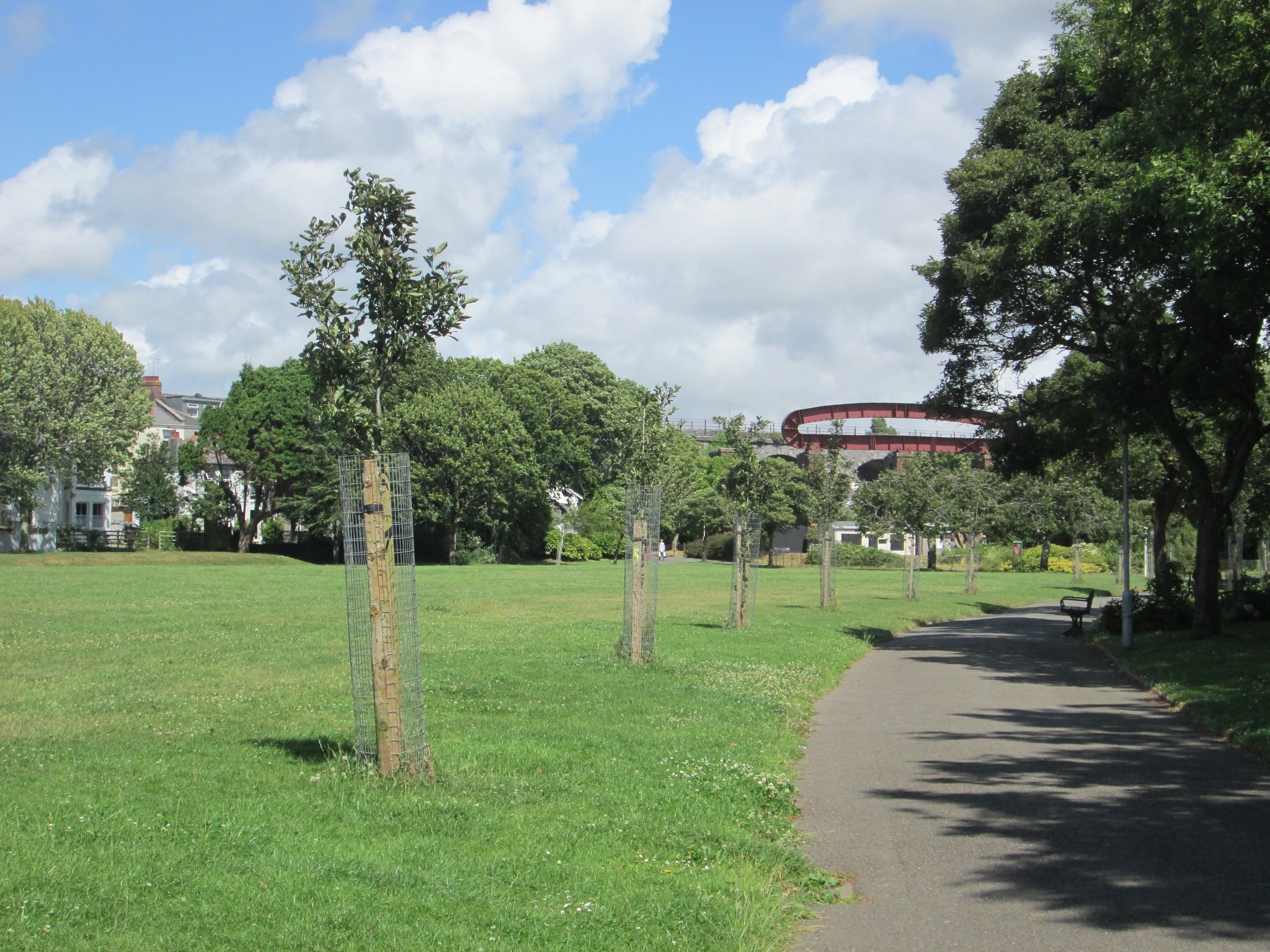
- Interactive map of Victoria Park, Plymouth
- Area: 6 hectares (0.060 km^{2})
- Website: www.plymouth.gov.uk/victoria-park

Victoria Park, showing flooding from the underground culverts in June 2005

Victoria Park is a park in Millbridge, Plymouth, England. It extends at the eastern end from the bowling green beneath what was once a railway viaduct to what is now the merging of Molesworth Road and Eldad Hill, and which once was a toll bridge, and an important thoroughfare between Devonport and Plymouth.

== History ==
The area which it occupies was once a part of an area of tidal marshland, known as the Deadlake; Batholomew Terrace, a road now adjacent to the park, was marked on 19th century maps of the area as Deadlake Lane. At the end of the 19th century, culverts were constructed to channel a few small streams which fed into the Deadlake, and the creek was filled in with rubble from the quarries at Oreston and Cattedown, a mile or so away.

After heavy rain the culverts can become overloaded and water forces its way to the surface. This has only been particularly dramatic once in the last 10 years, with no effect other than temporarily inconveniencing pedestrians using the park as a short cut between Millbridge and the city centre. The park, which has a park-keeper's lodge, was formally opened to the public in 1903. During World War II 3 underground shelters were built in Victoria Park to protect the population during the Blitz, and American Soldiers camped on the park's fields.

At the eastern end there is an 80 foot painted mild steel loop sculpture called Moor, by Turner Prize winner Richard Deacon, set in 1990, on top of three tall redundant red brick railway pillars.
