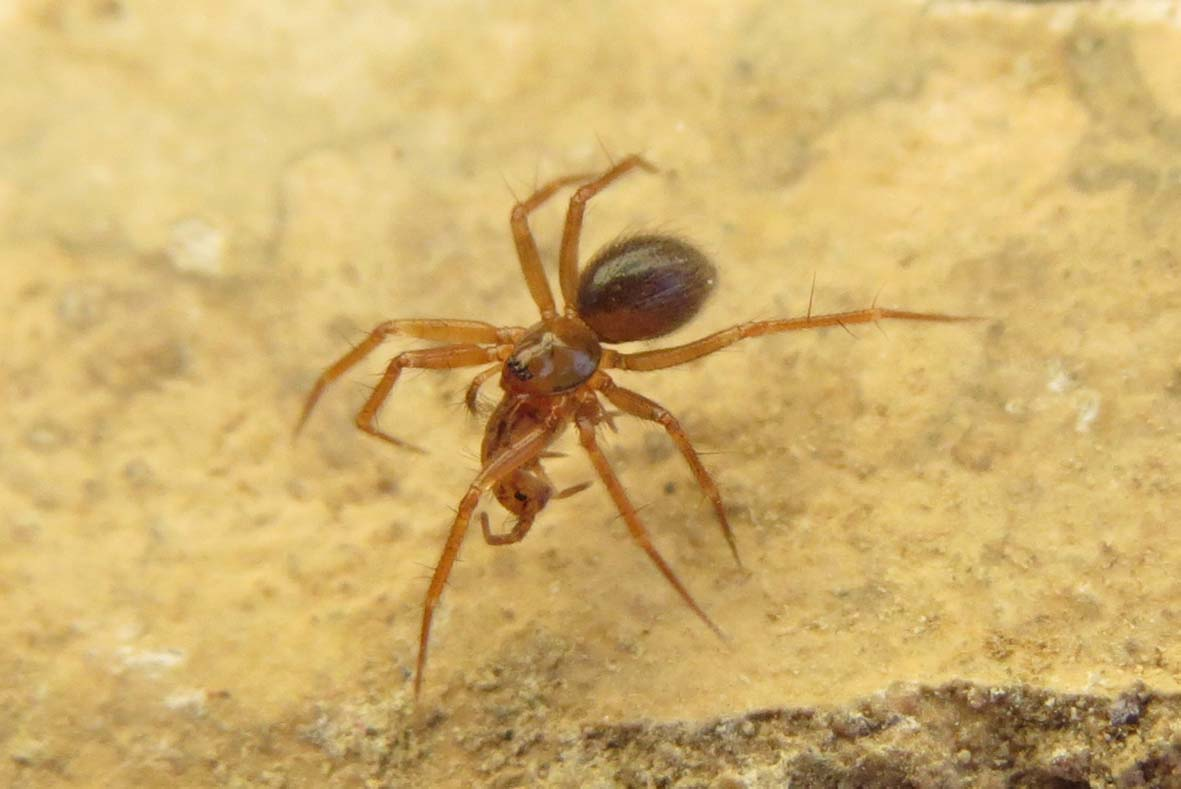
- A male Nothophantes horridus

Conservation status
- Critically Endangered (IUCN 3.1)

Scientific classification
- Kingdom: Animalia
- Phylum: Arthropoda
- Subphylum: Chelicerata
- Class: Arachnida
- Order: Araneae
- Infraorder: Araneomorphae
- Family: Linyphiidae
- Genus: Nothophantes; Merrett & Stevens, 1995
- Species: N. horridus

Binomial name
- Nothophantes horridus Merrett & Stevens, 1995

= Nothophantes =

Genus of spiders

Nothophantes, the horrid ground-weaver, is a critically endangered monotypic genus of European dwarf spiders containing the single species, Nothophantes horridus. It was first described by P. Merrett and R. A. Stevens in 1995, and has only been found in an area of Plymouth smaller than 1 square kilometre (0.39 sq mi). The genus name comes from the Ancient Greek νόθος (nothos), meaning "spurious", and hyphantes, meaning "weaver". The species name comes from the Latin horridus, meaning "bristly".

== Taxonomy ==
Nothophantes horridus is part of the Linyphiidae family and is closely related to two other genera: Lepthyphantes and Centromerus. The structure of the epigyne would suggest that Nothophantes belongs to the subfamily Lepthyphantinae. The form of the epigyne is very similar to that of the genus Centromerus and Centrophantes, however, the Chaetotaxy is very different comparing these genera and is more similar to the chaetotaxy of Troglohyphantes and Lepthyphantes. Nothophantes was considered to be included in the Lepthyphantes genus as it already was a large and diverse genus but the epigyne is too different to include it.

The male was found after the female and it confirmed the status of the taxonomy. The male pedipalp structure supports the subfamily as Lepthyphantinae and is most related to some Lepthyphantes species. However, the elongated Fickert's gland in the radix is very similar to the Centromerus genus. The broad and heavily sclerotised paracymbium is closer related to most Lepthyphantes species.

== Anatomy ==
Nothophantes horridus has a total body length of 2.5 millimetres (0.098 in), and has only been found in three limestone quarries and one industrial site in the Cattedown area. Shapter's Field Quarry, the species' type locality, has since been developed by builders and is now the Plymouth Trade Park industrial estate. Its small size and habit of living deep inside cracks and crevices of rocks makes them difficult to find.

The female horrid ground-weaver is diagnosable by its epigyne and chaetotaxy. The total body length ranges from 2.15 millimetres (0.085 in) to 2.95 millimetres (0.116 in), with a carapace length from 0.95 millimetres (0.037 in) to 1.25 millimetres (0.049 in) and 0.7 millimetres (0.028 in) to 0.9 millimetres (0.035 in) width. The abdomen is slightly bigger than the carapace with a length of 1.1 millimetres (0.043 in) to 1.6 millimetres (0.063 in). The sternum only has a length measuring from 0.55 millimetres (0.022 in) to 0.7 millimetres (0.028 in) and a width of 0.5 millimetres (0.020 in) to 0.65 millimetres (0.026 in). The colour of the female abdomen is pale grey or darker grey with pale yellow stripes on the dorsal side. The ventral side is also grey, sometimes with two pale longitudinal lines on the sides and a pale area anterior to the epigastric fold.

The chaetotaxy is distinct in the Nothophantes horridus. The Carapace has short hairs in the region of the eye and on the clypeus, while the sternum is covered with long hairs interspersed with some shorter hairs. Lastly, the abdomen is covered with short hairs and scattered with long bristles on the dorsal side. There are multiple short hairs on the anterior face. All femurs have several ventral spines arranged in two rows and the patellae have one short proximal spine and one long distal spine. The eyes of the spider are moderately small, with the anterior median eyes spaced 0.5 diameters apart from each other and 2 diameters from the anterior lateral eyes. The posterior median eyes are positioned about 1.25 diameters from each other and 1.5 diameters from the posterior lateral eyes.

The length of the legs of the horrid ground-weaver is the longest for the fourth legs with a total length of 4.28 millimetres (0.169 in), measured on a specimen with a carapace length of 0.96 millimetres (0.038 in). The second longest are the first legs (3.78 millimetres (0.149 in)), then the second legs (3.60 millimetres (0.142 in)), lastly, the third legs with a length of 3.38 millimetres (0.133 in).

The epigyne is very distinctive from other species and is characterized by a large transverse atrium, that first curves anteriorly and then posteriorly. The vulva has prominent internal chitinised apodemes, which partially obscure the duct structure.

Male horrid ground-weavers have a total body length of 2.4 millimetres (0.094 in) to 2.45 millimetres (0.096 in), with a carapace length of 1.05 millimetres (0.041 in) to 1.1 millimetres (0.043 in) and a width of 0.8 millimetres (0.031 in) and 0.85 millimetres (0.033 in). The abdomen is slightly bigger than the carapace with a length of 1.25 millimetres (0.049 in) to 1.3 millimetres (0.051 in). All somatic characters are the same as the female described earlier. However, on tibia II there is no prolateral spine and on tibia I the ventral spine is sometimes not present. The patella has a long curved dorsal spine.

The pedipalps are highly distinctive from other spiders in the same family. On the patella there is a long and curved dorsal spine, and the tibia has one dorsal and two retrolateral trichobothria.

The suprategulum has a broad, pointed suprategular apophysis, while the radix is heavily sclerotised distally and more lightly sclerotised towards the proximal end, which contains a looped duct and an elongated Fickert's gland. From the suprategulum the junction of radix and membrane, the median membrane arises. The membrane is lightly sclerotised proximally, featuring a long finger-like terminal process. The distal part of the membrane is more membranous and lies near the dorsal surface of the embolus, which is long and narrow with its distal part sclerotised and broadened forming lobes.

== Distribution ==
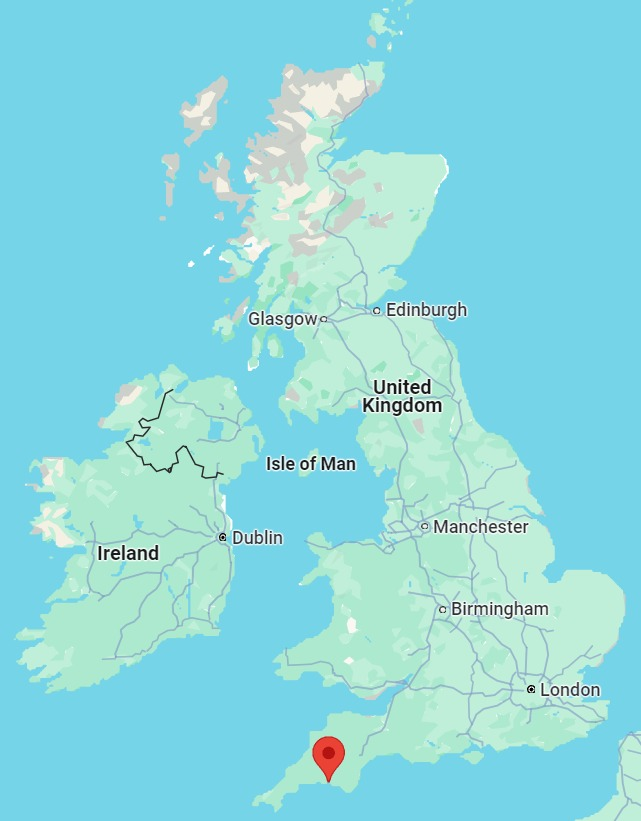
Map showing Plymouth, England, where Nothophantes horridus is located in Radford Quarry and Shapter's Field Quarry.

Nothophantes horridus has currently only been found in a disused limestone quarry in Cattedown, Plymouth, Devon, England. This quarry is situated on a Middle Devonian Limestone outcrop, located at the westernmost part of a limestone formation extending across Devon, south of Dartmoor. Unfortunately, the type locality is due for industrial development, which may destroy much of the species' known habitat.

In 1994, several specimens were collected from beneath large stones in exposed areas of the quarry floor and from a small stone on a limestone shelf along the north-east quarry face. The first known specimen, collected in 1991, is believed to have come from the quarry face, although the exact location remains unclear as it was part of a larger collection. To date, searches for additional populations in similar limestone formations around Plymouth have proven unsuccessful.

Given Cattedown's proximity to Plymouth's port, there is speculation that Nothophantes horridus may have been introduced to the area through human activity. However, the presence of a well-established population suggests the species has likely inhabited the region for an extended period. It is hypothesized that Nothophantes horridus may inhabit rock crevices or cave systems in the Shapter's Field limestone, with the collected specimens representing only a small part of the population that may periodically emerge from these retreats. Despite this, the spider does not exhibit significant adaptations for troglobitic (cave-dwelling) life, although it has moderately small eyes and long spines or bristles on its legs and abdomen.

The horrid ground-weaver is endemic to a specific region in England. The species has only been found in two sites in the Plymouth area: Radford Quarry, and a place formerly known as Shapter's Field Quarry. Shapter's Field Quarry has since been developed into Macadam Road, meaning the habitat has been changed.

To establish the distribution of the spider a study was performed. They looked in the Radford Quarry and Royal Mail Depot as this was a similar habitat. However, no N. horridus were collected. They recommend to do it in the spring as the earlier found specimens were found in March and April.

In 2016, there was a fourth site found in an industrial site in Cattedown area. This was the first time the horrid ground-weaver was photographed alive.

== Habitat ==
As said before, the horrid ground-weaver has only been found in limestone quarries. Radford Quarry and Shapter's Field Quarry are both limestone cliffs and slopes, where this spider has been found. Under stones and debris on the floor and cliff faces of disused limestone quarries. The horrid ground-weaver is troglodytic, which means it lives in narrow fissures in the limestone.

Inside Radford Quarry there are also a mix of other plants and wildlife that make up a rich biodiversity with nationally rare and scarce species. Radford Quarry has since been designated a County Wildlife Site due. Some of the scarce plants include dwarf mouse-ear (Cerastium pumilum), pyramidal orchid (Anacamptis pyramidalis), lesser centaury (Centaurium pulchellum), round-leaved crane's-bill (Geranium rotundifolium), pale flax (Linum bienne) and ivy broomrape (Orobanche hederae). There has also been invertebrate records that include centipede Henia vesuviana and butterflies like the brown argus (Aricia agestis).

The horrid ground-weaver is strongly associated with brownfields. Brownfield sites are areas of land which have been changed by human activity, like abandoned fields industrial or commercial properties, such as a quarry. Brownfields are important for biodiversity but are never managed with invertebrates in mind. The wild life rich brownfields were lost in a rapid pace. As sites are lost, species are becoming extinct and can no longer colonize a new site. It is important to keep these sites because scarce species like the horrid ground-weaver is of serious risk of going extinct.

== Behaviour ==
Little is known about the behaviour of the Nothophantes horridus but by looking at the behaviour of the Linyphiidae family, we can find out more about this species. This family is known for making sheet webs. These webs are made horizontal compared to the orb web and are made to catch insects falling into them. Sometimes they also make structural ropes above the web to intercept flying insects into hitting them down. Money spiders (all part of the Linyphiidae family) prey and feed on bug species such as beetles, springtails, flies and other spiders.

In a picture of John Walters on Twitter the horrid ground-weaver was found eating a springtail confirming at least this as a prey.

It is believed that the horrid ground-weaver (Nothophantes horridus) is nocturnal and only comes out to feed at night. All sightings of the Nothophantes horridus have been in the ground layer.

The predators of the Nothophantes horridus is also not known. However, animals that eat spiders include birds, reptiles, mammals and many arthropods. The way spiders survive includes self-amputating a leg that has been grabbed by a predator, warning colours, camouflage, mimicry. For the N. horridus camouflage would be more accurate, seeing as he was described as pale grey what would blend in with the quarry grounds. Next to that, the spider is believed to be nocturnal and thus hidden away during the day under stones and in fissures. During the day most predators are active, so the spider avoids them by being active at different times in the day.

== Conservation ==
The horrid ground-weaver is currently listed as a priority species under the UK Biodiversity-Action Plan. Efforts to conserve this species has focused on retaining its habitat.

In 2015, plans for housing developments at Radford Quarry were proposed. However, concerns about the loss of the spider's primary habitat were raised. The charity Buglife launched campaigns to stop the housing development, which successfully delayed the quarry's destruction with 10,000 signatures and further research was funded with nearly £10,500 raised. In 2015, new Nothophantes horridus specimens were unsuccessful to find, restricting its distribution to the already known Plymouth area. However, in 2016 a new population was found in the Cattedown area.

Current conservation actions highlight several conservation challenges. Firstly, there needs to be enough space for the spider to survive. Secondly, the planning system needs to be able to protect our environmental heritage. Moreover, Britain needs to halt biodiversity loss. Finally, society needs to appreciate and value the small and insignificant species. These are some issues that are raised, but animal life is important to conserve. The future stays uncertain as any long-term solutions have not been made.
