= Devil's Point, Plymouth =

Area in Plymouth, Devon

Coordinates: 50.3617°N 4.1647°W

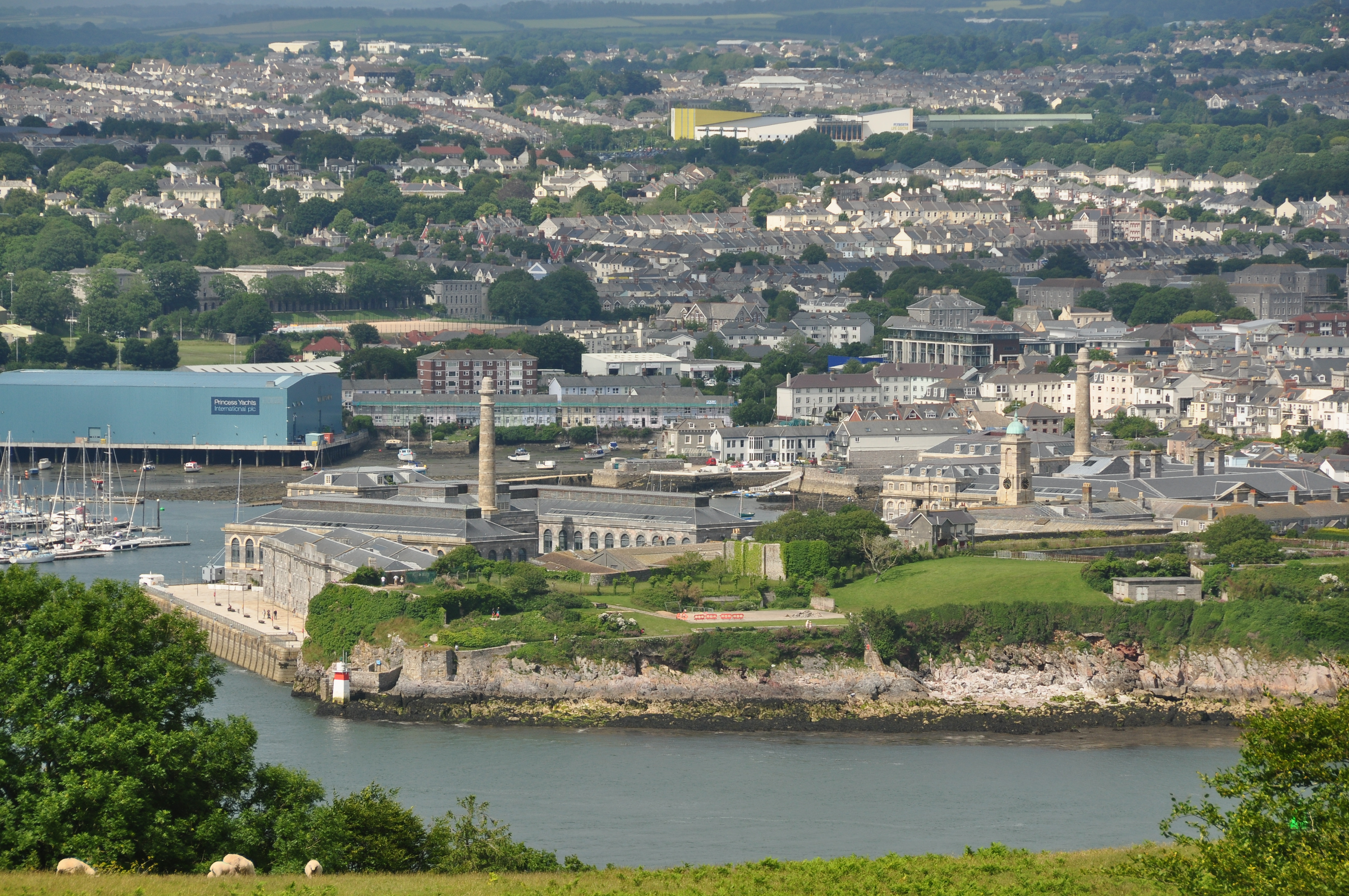
Devil's Point as seen from Mount Edgcumbe Country Park

Devil's Point (also called Western King Point) is located on the eastern side of the mouth of the River Tamar where it meets the English Channel at Plymouth Sound.

== Geography ==
Devil's Point marks the southwest extremity of East Stonehouse in Plymouth. On the opposite western shore of the Tamar is Mount Edgcumbe Country Park. To the immediate north is the Royal William Yard.

The area features a public park with a wealth of historical features.

For centuries, Devil's Point been used by friends and family to wave goodbye or welcome home to the crews of Royal Navy warships as they transit the narrow waters adjacent to Devil's Point.

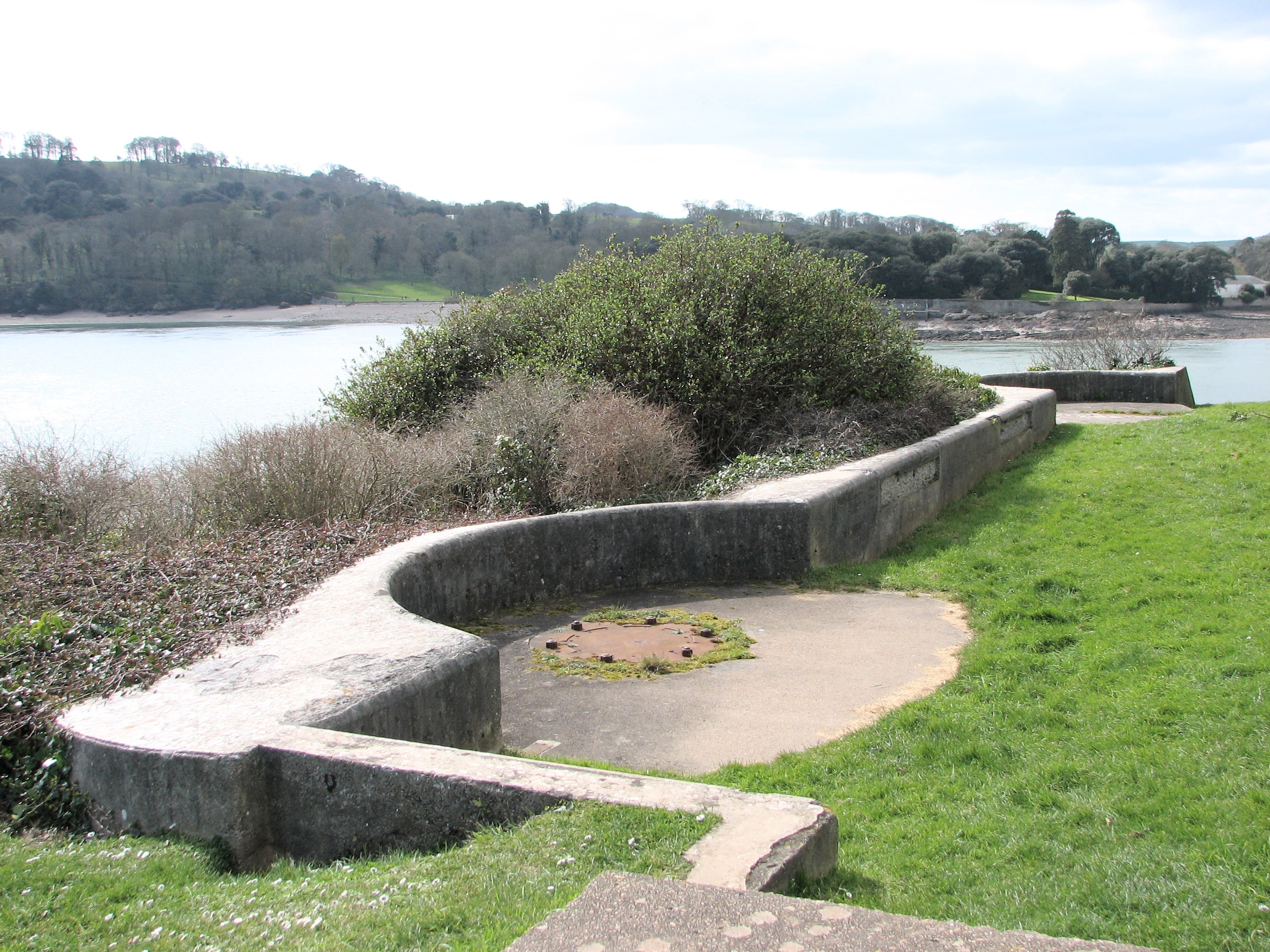
Devil's Point Battery B

== Military history ==
Also located at Devil's Point is Devil's Point Battery which was built between 1901 and 1902. It was armed with two 12–pounder Quick Firing guns. Both had been removed by 1936, but the positions remain today.
