= Millbridge, Plymouth =

Suburb of Plymouth, Devon

Coordinates: 50°22′35″N 4°09′27″W

Millbridge is a small neighbourhood of Plymouth, on the boundary of what used to be the towns of Plymouth and Devonport, in the English county of Devon.

== History ==
What was originally a self-standing village (which has now been subsumed within the city) lies to the north of the toll bridge, originally built by Sir Piers Edgcumbe in 1525. The bridge crossed what used to be the Deadlake or Stonehouse Creek, to the west of Pennycomequick, the south of Stoke village and to the east of Stoke Church. It derives its name from the old toll bridge (adjacent to a naval saw mill) across the creek between Eldad Hill and Molesworth Road, at one time the principal link between Plymouth and Devonport. The creek to the east of the bridge was filled in with material from the quarries at Cattedown and Oreston during the late 1890s and the ground created became a municipal park, Victoria Park, which was officially opened in 1903. The remainder of the creek to the west of Millbridge, up to Stonehouse Bridge and Pool, was filled in and by 1972 the whole area had been developed as rugby pitches. These pitches are often used by Devonport High School for Boys and the Old Boys RFC.

== Economy ==
There is a pub, the Millbridge Inn.
