= Royal William Victualling Yard =

Site of Grade I and II listed buildings in Plymouth

Coordinates: 50°21′42.12″N 4°09′53.1″W

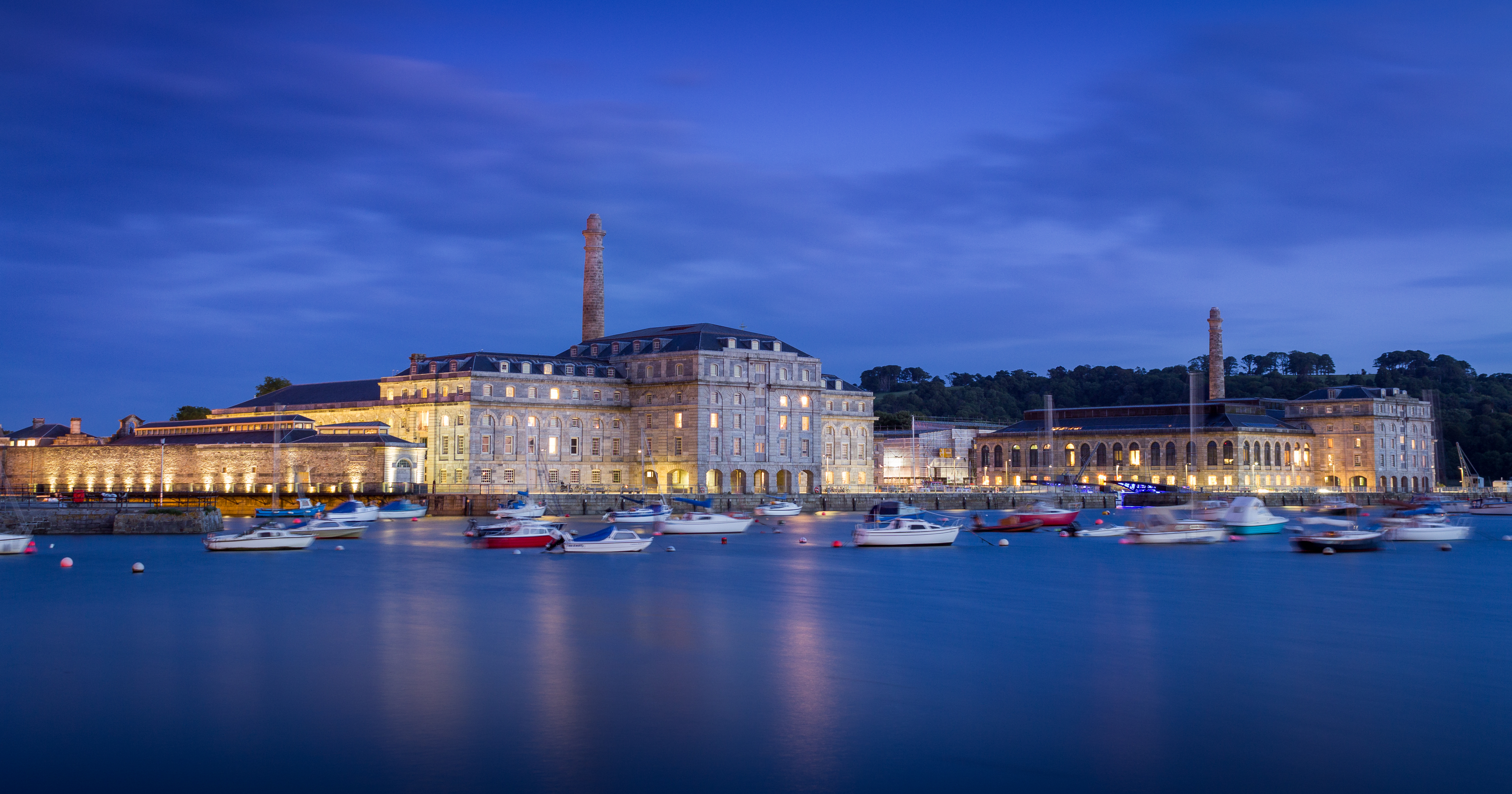
The Royal William Victualling Yard, viewed from the north-east: (l-r) the Slaughterhouse, Mills/Bakery, basin entrance and Brewhouse

The Royal William Victualling Yard in Stonehouse, a suburb of Plymouth, England, was the major victualling depot of the Royal Navy and an important adjunct of Devonport Dockyard. It was designed by the architect Sir John Rennie and was named after King William IV. It was built between 1826 and 1835 and occupies a site of approximately 16 acres (65,000 m^{2}) being half of Western Kings, north of Devil's Point.

The Yard was released from the Ministry of Defence (MOD) in 1992 and subsequently passed to the Plymouth Development Corporation. Upon the Corporation's closure in 1999, the Yard was then passed to the South West Regional Development Agency (SWRDA) who funded and carried out the extensive c. £60m restoration of the structural fabric of the majority of principal buildings and infrastructure within the yard between 1999 and 2008. During this period the buildings were recategorised from Scheduled Monuments to Grade I/II listed buildings. Private sector development partners Urban Splash were then engaged to carry out the specialist conversion of the site into a mixed-use development.

Described as the grandest of the royal victualling yards, 'in its externally largely unaltered state it remains today one of the most magnificent industrial monuments in the country'.

== Origins in Old Plymouth ==
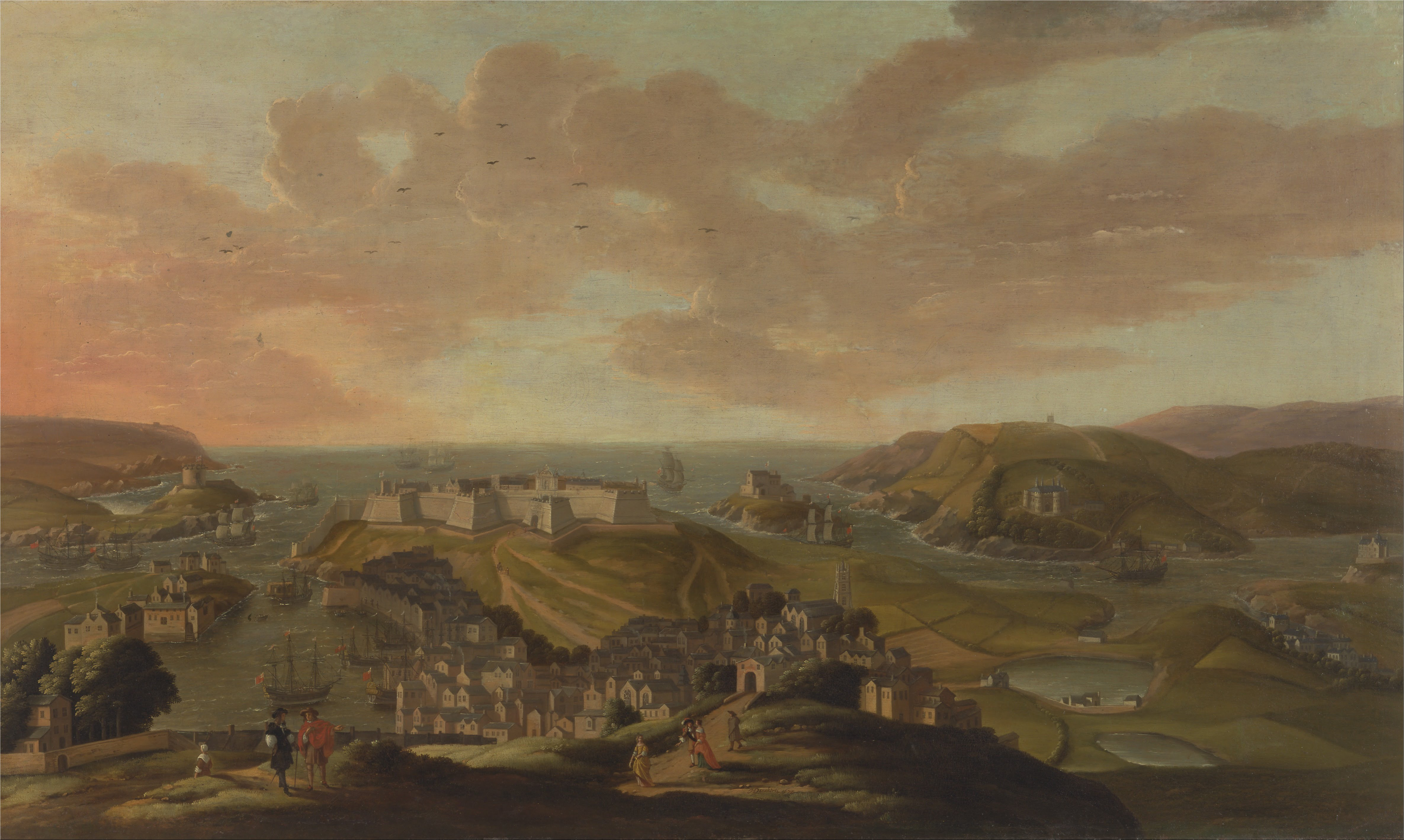
Oil painting of Plymouth, with Sutton Harbour to the left, by Hendrick Danckerts, 1673.

Plymouth had been involved in victualling the English fleet since the 13th century. In the 1650s the Commonwealth government built victualling storehouses on Lambhay Hill next to Hoe Fort (which would soon be rebuilt as the Royal Citadel), with manufacturing taking place at various locations around the old harbour and a wharf providing a loading area for ships in Sutton Pool (albeit only accessible at high tide).

Following the establishment of a Royal Navy Dockyard in what would later be known as Devonport, in 1690, these victualling premises expanded substantially. A new Victualling Office was opened in Lambhay in 1707, overseen by an Agent Victualler. From 1729, brewing took place across the Hamoaze at Southdown, where a cooperage was also established; it was capable of producing up to 80 tuns of beer per week and had its own wharf (again, only accessible at high-tide). In 1745, the Lambhay site was further expanded, with the construction of two bakehouses, a slaughterhouse and several storehouses, as well as a new wharf. (The slaughterhouse was later removed to Devil's Point.) The bakeries were capable of producing 50 tons of bread each week, however, the mills which produced the flour were three-quarters of a mile away, making baking a difficult process; nevertheless, these facilities continued in use until 1831. These mills were leased by the Victualling Commissioners from the Town Corporation. The Victualling Office depended on local farmers for fresh produce to supplement the dry goods it provided; inevitably, the local economy could be significantly affected by the varying needs of the fleet.

Towards the end of the Napoleonic Wars, the Victualling establishment at Lambhay is described as 'an extensive range of buildings lying by the side of the Catwater harbour', including:

- A Cooperage (office, workshops and yard for repairing barrels)
- Offices (for the Agent Victualler, Clerk of the Cheque and Clerk of the Stores)
- Residence (for the Agent Victualler) and gardens
- Two bake-houses (each with four ovens)
- Several granaries and storehouses

The wharf in front had a small jetty attached.

Following the establishment of the Royal William Victualling Yard, the old Yard at Lambhay was closed; its buildings were sold in 1835 and from 1847 several of them were used as a Government Emigration Depot. In 1897 they were renamed Elphinstone Barracks, accommodating a torpedo depot of the Royal Engineers, before being demolished in the 1930s.

== The new Yard in Stonehouse ==
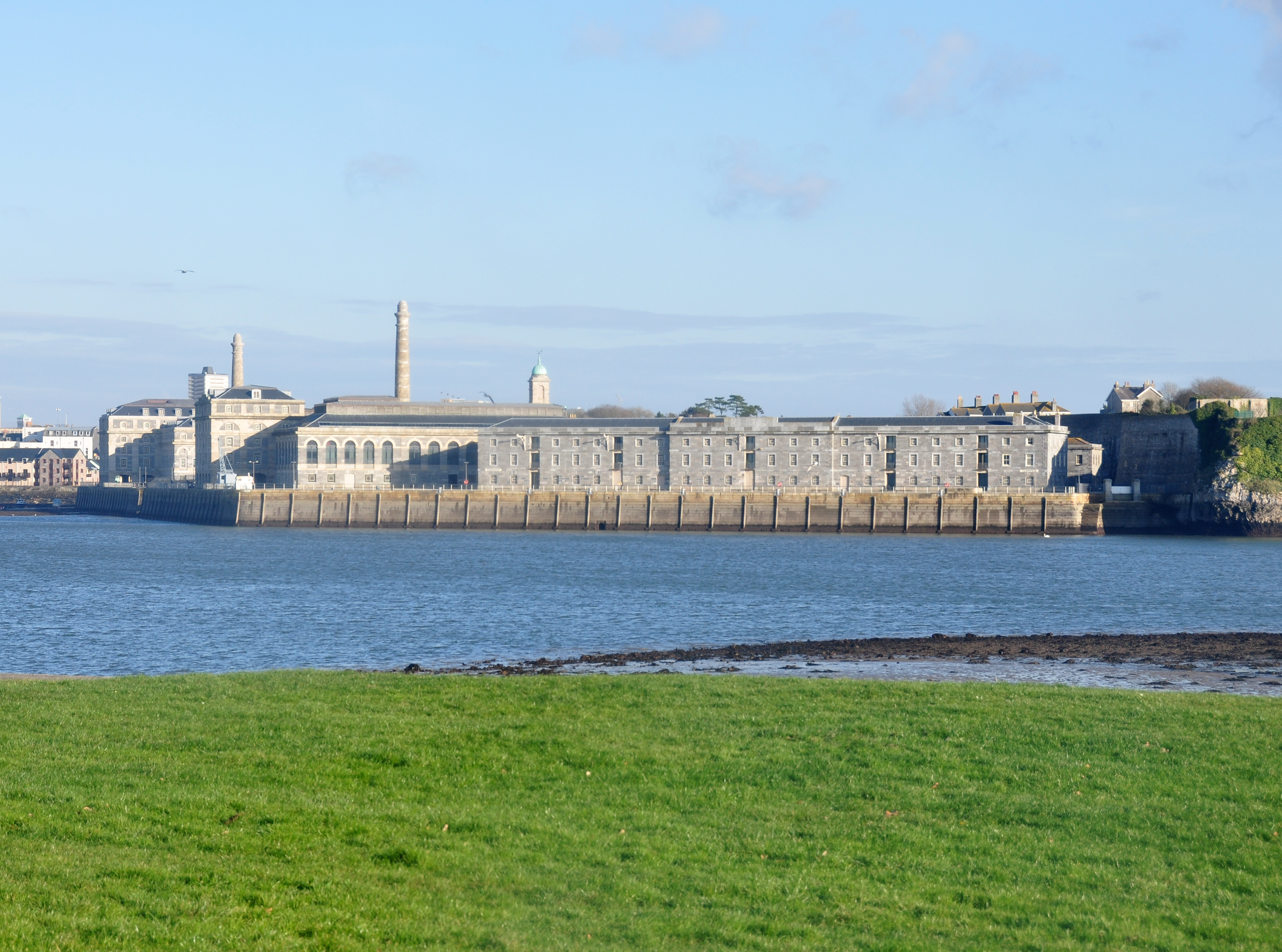
The Yard viewed from Cremyll. The Clarence building, in the foreground, was the first to be erected on the site.

In 1821 it was decided to centralise Plymouth's victualling provision in a new location. The area then known as 'Cremill Point' was chosen, both for its 'great depth of water' and for its equal proximity to the Dockyard, the Hamoaze and the Sound. An act of Parliament, the Victualling Establishment, Plymouth Act 1824' (5 Geo. 4. c. 49), sanctioned the purchase of the site and the Victualling Commissioners appointed John Rennie as architect. Over the next three years, an 8-acre (3.2 ha) area of the northern half of the promontory known as Western King was levelled to provide the site for the new yard, with 370,000 tons of excavated rubble being used to extend the site by a further 6 acres (2.4 ha) (reclaimed from the sea), as well as providing stone for building. Convict labour was used for this initial work. Work on the first of the buildings began in late 1827, and on the boundary walls and the basin the following year; in July 1831 the transfer took place of the Victualling offices and stores from the old premises in Lambhay to the new premises in Stonehouse (albeit construction was set to continue until the mid-1830s). Once complete, they were named the Royal William Victualling Yard.

The Yard consolidated in one place various victualling activities from around the Plymouth area, including the brewing of beer, the slaughtering of live animals for fresh meat, the manufacture of barrels, the baking of bread and biscuits and the production of flour; as well as providing space for administration, accommodation and large amounts of storage. No sooner had it been built, however, than the intended function of the Yard began to change: abolition of the Navy beer ration in 1831 meant that beer was only ever brewed in very small quantities in the Yard (just enough for the nearby Naval Hospital and Royal Marine Infirmary); and over time for various reasons (including a steady rise in the Navy's use of tinned food), the Yard came to be use increasingly for storage and less for manufacturing. In 1891, a significant section of the Royal William Yard (including the Brewhouse, Cooperage and Clarence block) was converted into a Royal Naval Ordnance Depot. Nevertheless, the Yard would continue to fulfil a crucial role in provisioning Britain's naval fleet for a further 100 years.

== Description ==
The Royal William Victualling Yard is arranged around a deep basin lined with granite (designed to accommodate half a dozen 'transports' or merchant vessels). This basin provided the main point of access from the sea, although a double set of steps rising from a landing-stage below the Clarence Building provided a fitting entrance for dignitaries arriving by boat. A tunnel entrance was also provided, giving access from Firestone Bay (on the opposite side of the promontory), where boats could be landed in the event of vessels being prevented (e.g. by a strong tide or adverse weather) from reaching the basin. The main access from land was (and is) through a grand gateway at the end of Cremyll Street, a high wall having been built around the landward portion of the site for its security. A reservoir to the south provided the Yard with an independent supply of fresh water.

=== The buildings ===
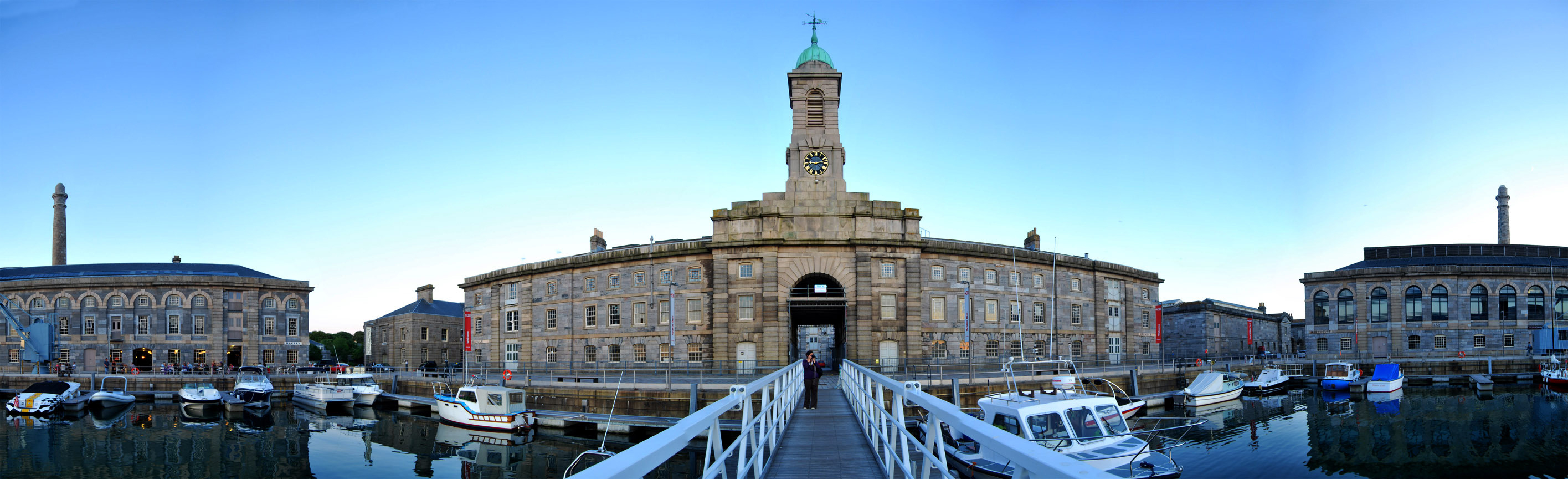
Left to right: Mills Bakery, New Cooperage, Melville Building, Cooperage, Brewhouse.

The Royal William Yard includes a collection of Grade I and Grade II listed buildings, built from Devon limestone with granite detailing, arranged around the square basin; these include (East to West):

==== Clarence ====
Positioned at the opposite end of the yard to the gatehouse, the Clarence building closes the vista along the main thoroughfare. Begun in 1827 (the first structure to be built on the site), it was originally used as a liquid store with one floor each of spirits, vinegar and beer (use of iron for the roof, doors, windows etc. was to mitigate against the flammability of alcohol). As needs changed, so did the role of the Clarence Store, and latterly the building was used for the storage of spares and components.

Clarence consists of 52 contemporary apartments.

==== Brewhouse ====
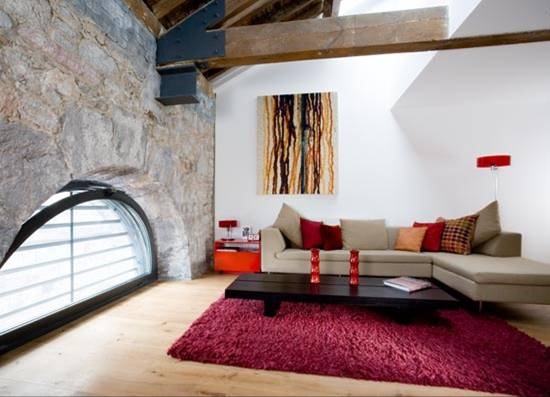
Living space in the Brewhouse

Although purpose built in 1832, it was never actually equipped as a brewhouse since emerging technology was allowing large quantities of fresh water to be carried at sea, eliminating the need for the beer rations. (A shed was later built to store ships water tanks within the Brewhouse courtyard, where they had been stored from as early as 1840.) The building itself stood empty until 1885, when the west wing was converted into a new slaughterhouse, with cattle lairs, a meat store and a vegetable store; at the same time the east wing functioned as a rum store and the central engine house was repurposed to provide hydraulic power to the Yard's many cranes. Later, for much of the 20th century, the Brewhouse housed a torpedo workshop.

This building has 78 apartments, together with ground floor commercial space for exhibitions, cafés and restaurants.

==== Cooperage ====
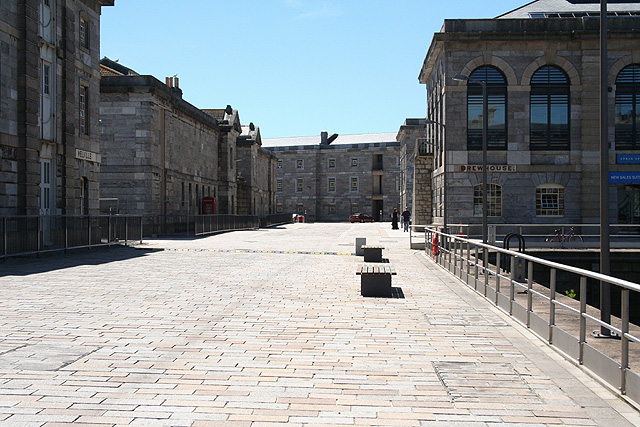
Looking towards Clarence with the Cooperage on the left and Brewhouse on the right. Finely-engineered stonework is seen throughout the Yard

Originally a combination of workshops, offices and storage/seasoning space (built around a pair of concentric quadrangles) the cooperage accommodated 100 coopers to make the barrels and kegs in which the produce of the Yard could be stored and transported. In 1869, however, the Navy decided to concentrate the majority of its barrel manufacturing work at Deptford; the coopers' skills were still required at Stonehouse (for repairs and production of smaller items) but their numbers declined over time until only 12 were employed. In 1891 the coopers and other craftsmen based there were transferred to the New Cooperage (q.v.), to make way for the newly established Navy Ordnance Board. The Board transformed the Old Cooperage into a machine shop and ordnance store, and in 1916 the courtyards were roofed over.

In 2015 the eastern half of the outer quadrangle was converted into an arts venue, Ocean Studios; the eastern half was later due to be turned into residential units, with the central quadrangle serving as an 'events space'.

==== Melville ====
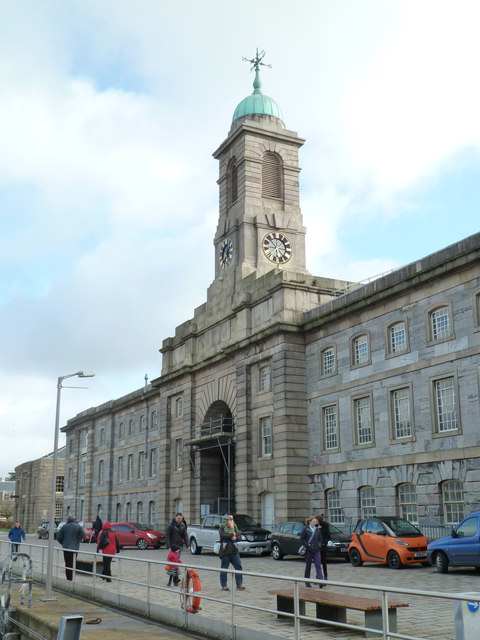
Melville block.

Quadrangular storehouse building, designed, built and operated as the nerve centre of the whole of the Royal William Yard; begun in 1829, this was the second building to be constructed on the site. All administration was carried out here and it served as a major storehouse for food, clothing and equipment. As of 2014 it was scheduled to be converted into a hotel. The central cupola contains the yard's original (and still functioning) quarter-chiming clock of 1831 by Benjamin Lewis Vulliamy.

In 2023 work was underway to create 40 flats within the Melville block; other parts of the building contain offices, restaurants, a gym and a cinema.

==== New Cooperage ====
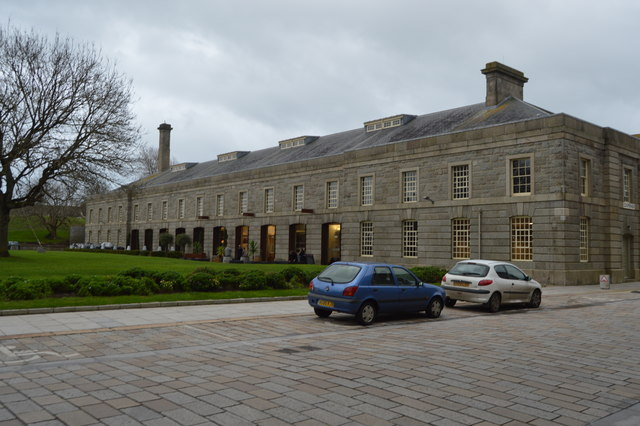
New Cooperage.

Sixty years after the Yard was completed, the New Cooperage was built to house the coopers and others tradesmen displaced by the Naval Ordnance Board and its workshops. Here there was room for painters, wheelwrighters and a host of other skilled men needed to keep the Royal Navy in perfect trim. Its final use was a survival pack ration and equipment store.

Today it houses offices, a restaurant and retail premises.

==== Mills and Bakery ====
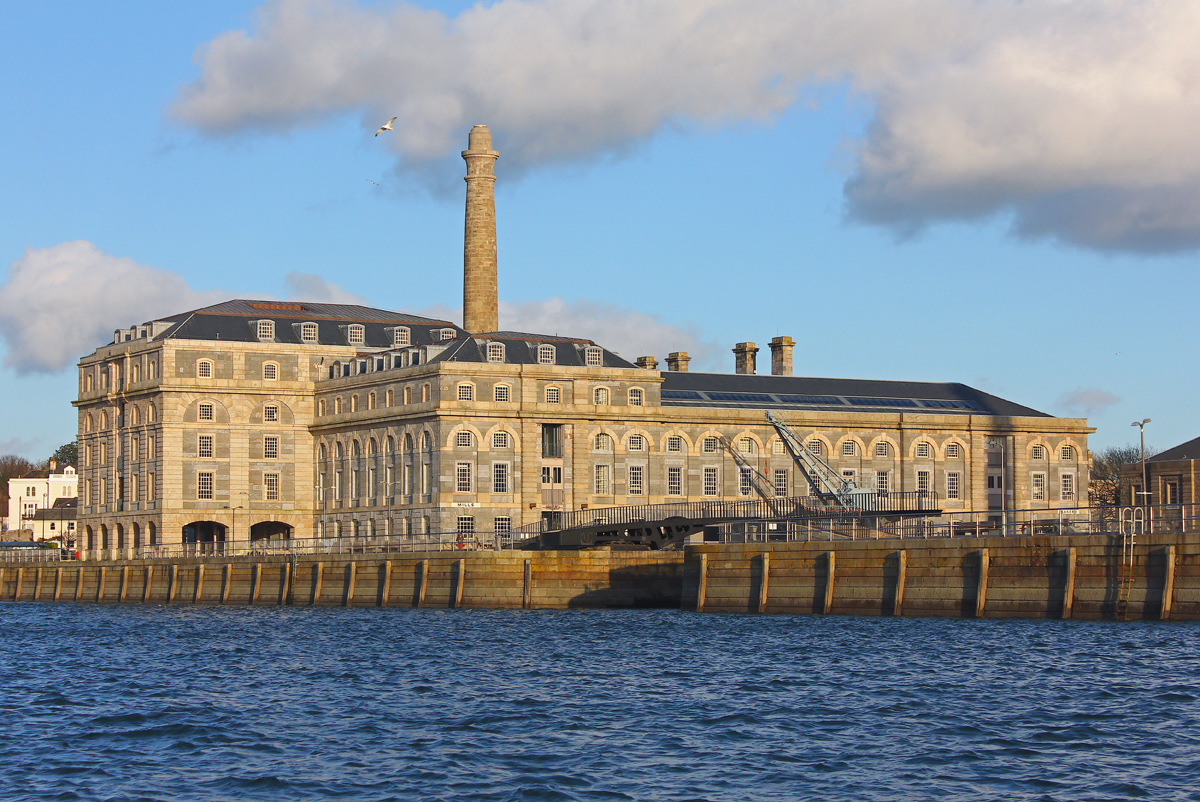
Mills and bakery

The northern range of this complex of buildings contained a central granary flanked by flour mills, with 27 sets of millstones powered by a pair of steam engines, capable of producing 270,000 lb (120,000 kg) of flour per week. Grain could be loaded directly into the granary from vessels on the quayside. The southern range contained the bakery, with two sets of six ovens, back-to-back either side of the central spine wall (beneath a row of four square chimneys). There was a central boiler house with a chimney, with one engine to the north and the other to the south (the engines also powered biscuit-making equipment). The biscuits were dried on the upper floors of the side ranges; there was also a drying kiln above the boiler house. Although fully equipped as a biscuit and bread factory when opened in 1834, it was initially given only one full production run; then in 1839 the equipment was removed and installed instead in the Victualling Yard at Deptford. There was no more baking here until 1843 when, newly equipped, the complex again began to be used for its original purpose (which it continued to fulfil until 1925). It subsequently became a clothing and equipment store. The building was damaged by a fire in 1929, and again in 1960.

The building is now known as Mills Bakery and includes 86 apartments, commercial and office space.

==== Main Gate ====
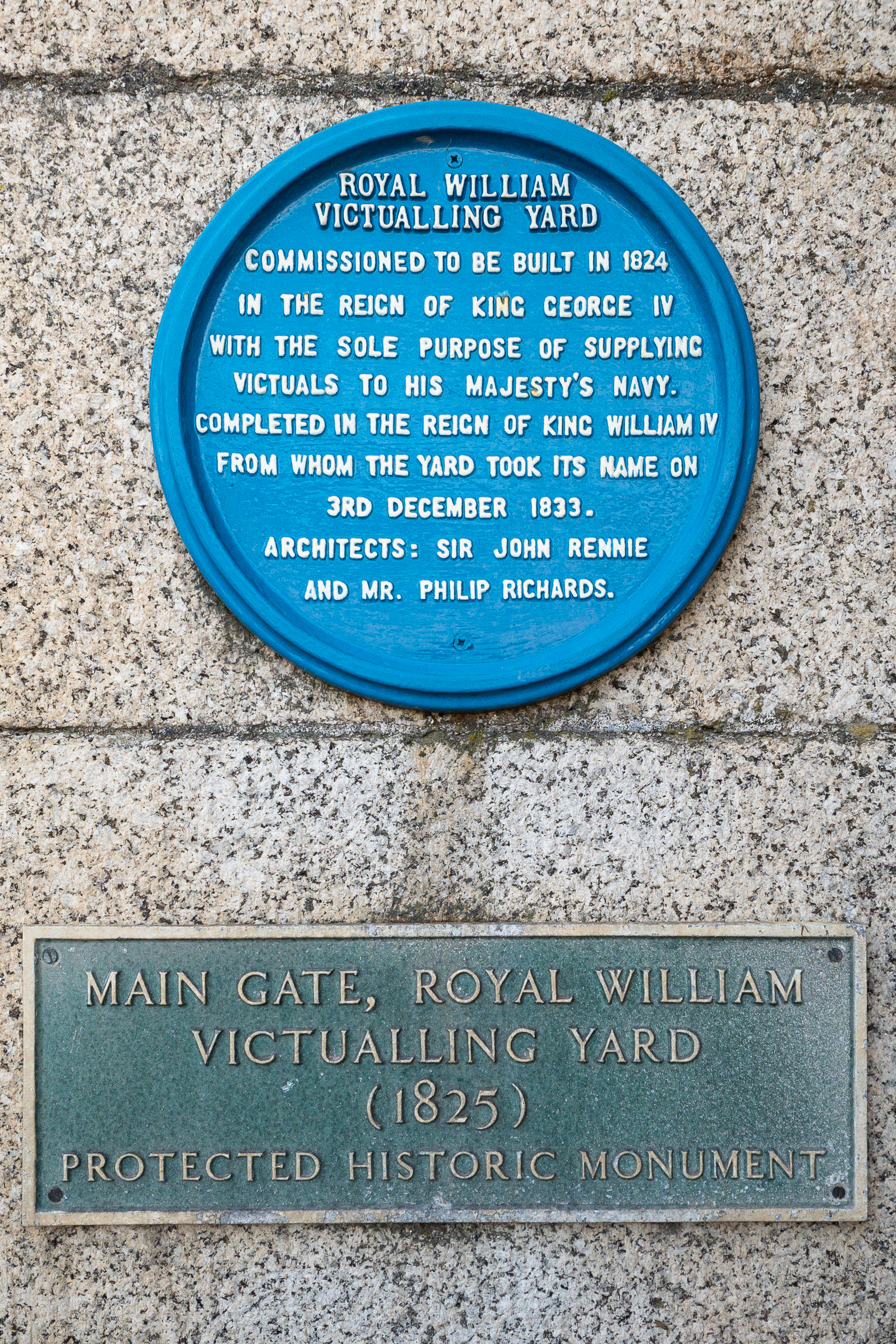
Plaques beside the Main Gate

The Gatehouse, together with the adjacent Guardhouse and Slaughterhouse, was begun in 1830. The granite 'triumphal arch' gateway is topped by a 13-foot statue of King William IV (the Yard's namesake). It also displays the crossed anchor device of the Victualling Commissioners.

==== Slaughterhouse ====
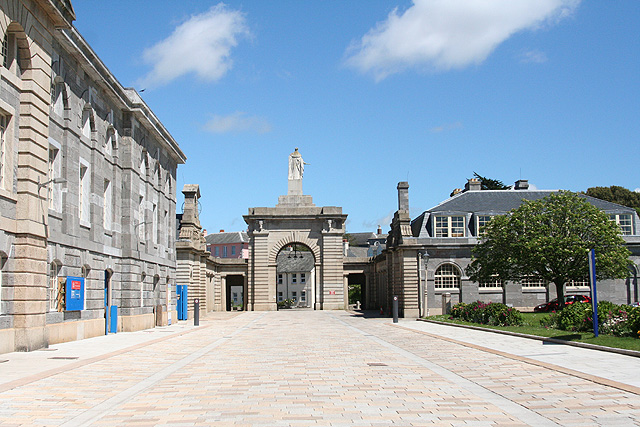
The Gateway, flanked by the Slaughterhouse and Guardhouse, is topped by a statue of William IV

Behind the colonnade is a long triangular yard, which had cattle pens along one side, the slaughterhouse on the other and an office at the far end. Live animals would enter via an arched gateway, just north of the Main Gate, directly into the cattle yard. Up to 100 bullocks per day were slaughtered here to provide fresh meat for vessels anchored in the sound (whereas salted meat, for vessels going to sea, was brought in from the Commissioners' main Victualling Yard at Deptford). The building was in use for this purpose for 26 years from 1859; thereafter it was used for storage.

More recently, the Slaughterhouse was used as a centre for building repair and maintenance, before being converted into a restaurant.

==== The Guardhouse ====
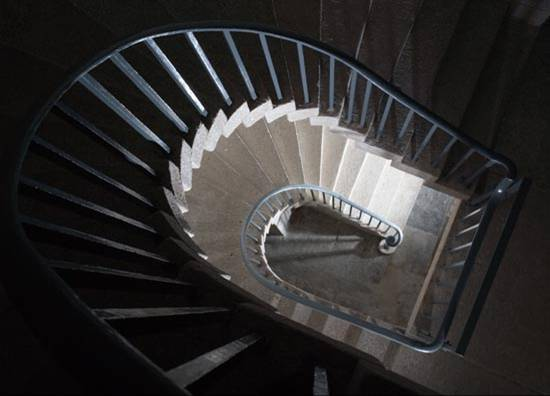
Stairs in the Guardhouse

This small complex comprised a porter's lodge, guardhouse and warden's accommodation.

It has now been restored and is occupied as a small office space and art studio.

==== Residences 1 and 2 ====
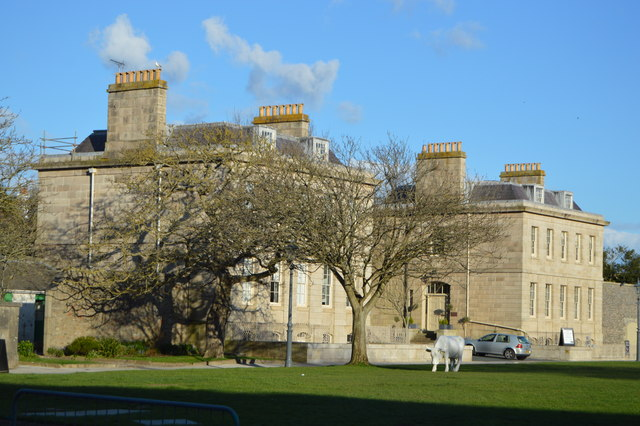
Officers' Houses.

These two grand houses were built for civil service officers in the Royal William Yard and were continuously occupied as homes until shortly after Plymouth Development Corporation took over ownership.

Residence 2 is currently utilised as office space while Residence 1 is now a Boutique Hotel.

=== Restoration and conversion ===
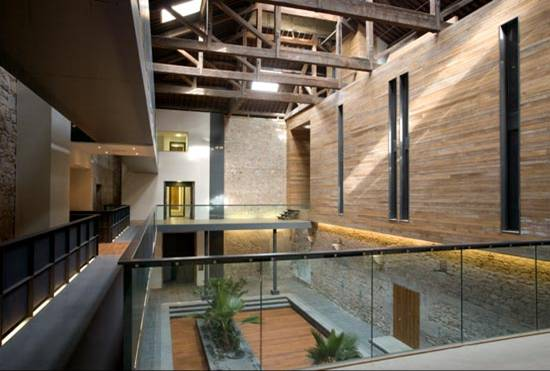
Winter Garden in the Brewhouse

Early conservation and restoration work was carried out by Gilmore Hankey Kirke Architects. Together with Acanthus Ferguson Mann Architects they were awarded by the RIBA in the South West region for the Clarence and Brewhouse buildings. The scheme is also a winner of a RIBA 2006 Conservation Awards, which recognise best practice in the field of building conservation. Continued restoration, conservation and conversion of these Georgian Buildings has been carried out by Urban Splash with Gillespie Yunnie Architects. The site is open to the public and offers the 'Tunnel to Firestone Bay' a public basin for visiting boats and restaurants, cafés and public events.
