= St Mary's Church, Cattedown =

Demolished church in Plymouth, England

St Mary's Church
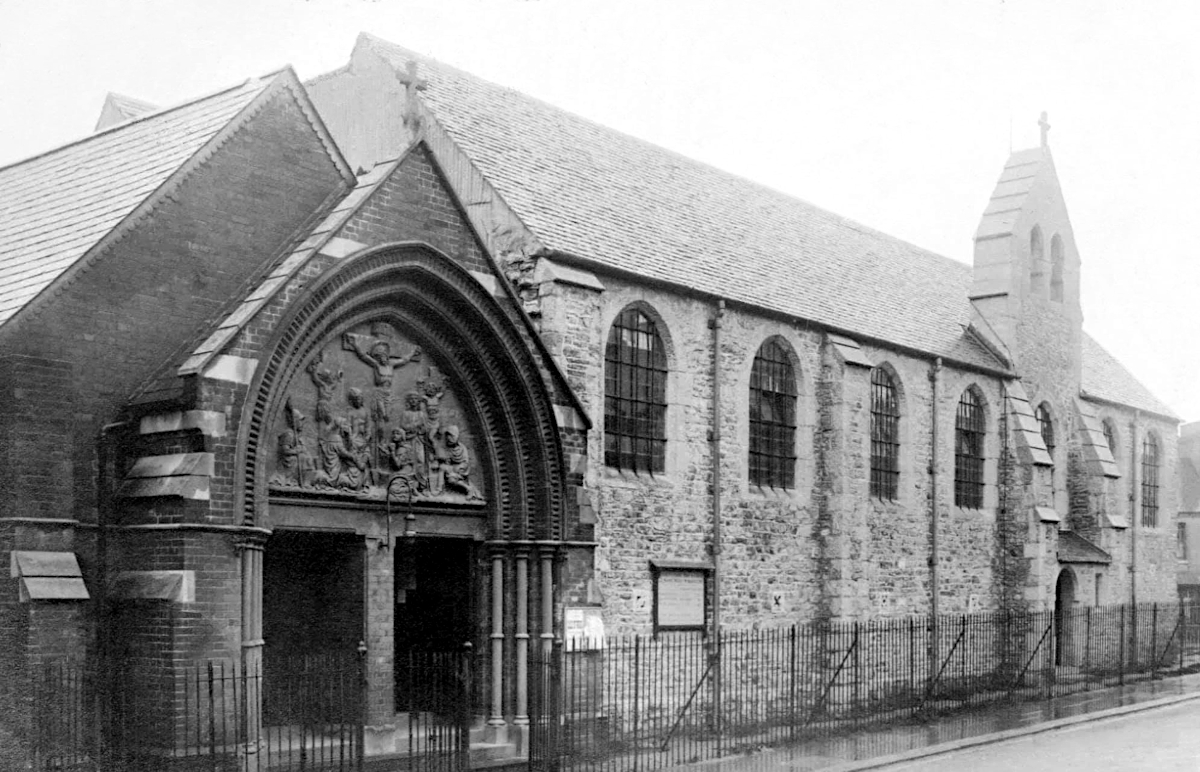
- The now-demolished St Mary's Church in the early 20th century.

Religion
- Affiliation: Church of England
- Ecclesiastical or organizational status: Demolished
- Year consecrated: 1912

Location
- Location: Cattedown, Plymouth, Devon, England
- Interactive map of St Mary's Church
- Coordinates: 50.3679°N 4.1182°W

Architecture
- Architect: Sir Charles Nicholson
- Type: Church

St Mary's Church was a Church of England church in Cattedown, Plymouth, Devon, England. It was built between 1911 and 1912 to the designs of Sir Charles Nicholson. After closing as a place of worship in 1956, it was largely used for storage purposes. It also partly served as a church hall and community centre from 1990 and was demolished in 2007–08.

== History ==
=== Construction of St Mary's ===
The church of St Mary the Virgin and St Mary Magdalene was built to serve the population of the large industrial district of Cattedown. By the late 19th century, new housing and expansion within the area left the parish church of St John no longer able to adequately serve the entire Sutton-on-Plym parish. In 1893, H. E. Tracey Elliot of James Terrace gifted a site for a new church at the east end of Alvington Street and the then-vicar of the parish, Rev. Wynell-Mayow, formed a committee to oversee its construction.

The church scheme continued to be pursued by the next vicar, Rev. C. H. Salt, and an estimated £1,000 had been raised by 1899. A temporary place of worship with seating for 160 people was built and a new church district was formed within the parish, covering an estimated population of 5,000. The temporary church was designed to later form the west end of the permanent church and a temporary east wall was built in anticipation of this. The building was opened and dedicated by the Bishop of Crediton, Rev. Robert Trefusis, on 13 February 1899.

The plans for the permanent church were drawn up by the London-based architect Sir Charles Nicholson, who designed it with seating for up to 630 people. It was to include a nave, chancel, north and south aisles, a small chapel in the south aisle, clergy vestry, and choir vestry. The first portion of work was constructed between 1911 and 1912, but omitted the vestries and parish room. It was estimated that the total cost of the church would be £6,400, including £3,400 for the first portion of the work and £2,500 for the remaining sections.

A sod-cutting ceremony was held on the site on 1 July 1911, with Mrs Trefusis performing the cut of the first sod on behalf of the Bishop of Crediton, who was unable to attend. The foundation stone was then laid by the Bishop of Exeter, Rev. Archibald Robertson, on 9 September 1911. Construction of the church was undertaken by Messrs W. Cowlin and Sons of Bristol. The church was consecrated by the Bishop of Exeter on 6 May 1912. The occasion was marred by a group who gathered outside the church in protest over the "alleged Ritualistic practices" of the vicar, Rev. W. Stevenson and the curate, Rev. H. H. Holloway. The new ecclesiastical parish of St Mary's was formed from Sutton-on-Plym on 7 May 1912. The church was the seventh to have been built under the Three Towns Church Extension Scheme and a significant proportion of its cost was covered by the Three Towns Church Extension Fund. The proposed vestries had been added to the church by 1933.

=== Closure, later use and demolition ===
St Mary's closed as a place of worship in 1956 and the parish was incorporated back into Sutton-on-Plym. In 1961, the Church Commissioners approved the letting of the church for storage purposes. It was used by the South Western Electricity Board for much of this time, then the flooring accessory wholesalers Christal Supplies from 1987. In 1989–90, part of the building was converted into a combined church hall and community centre at a cost of £35,000, while the remaining part continued use as a warehouse.

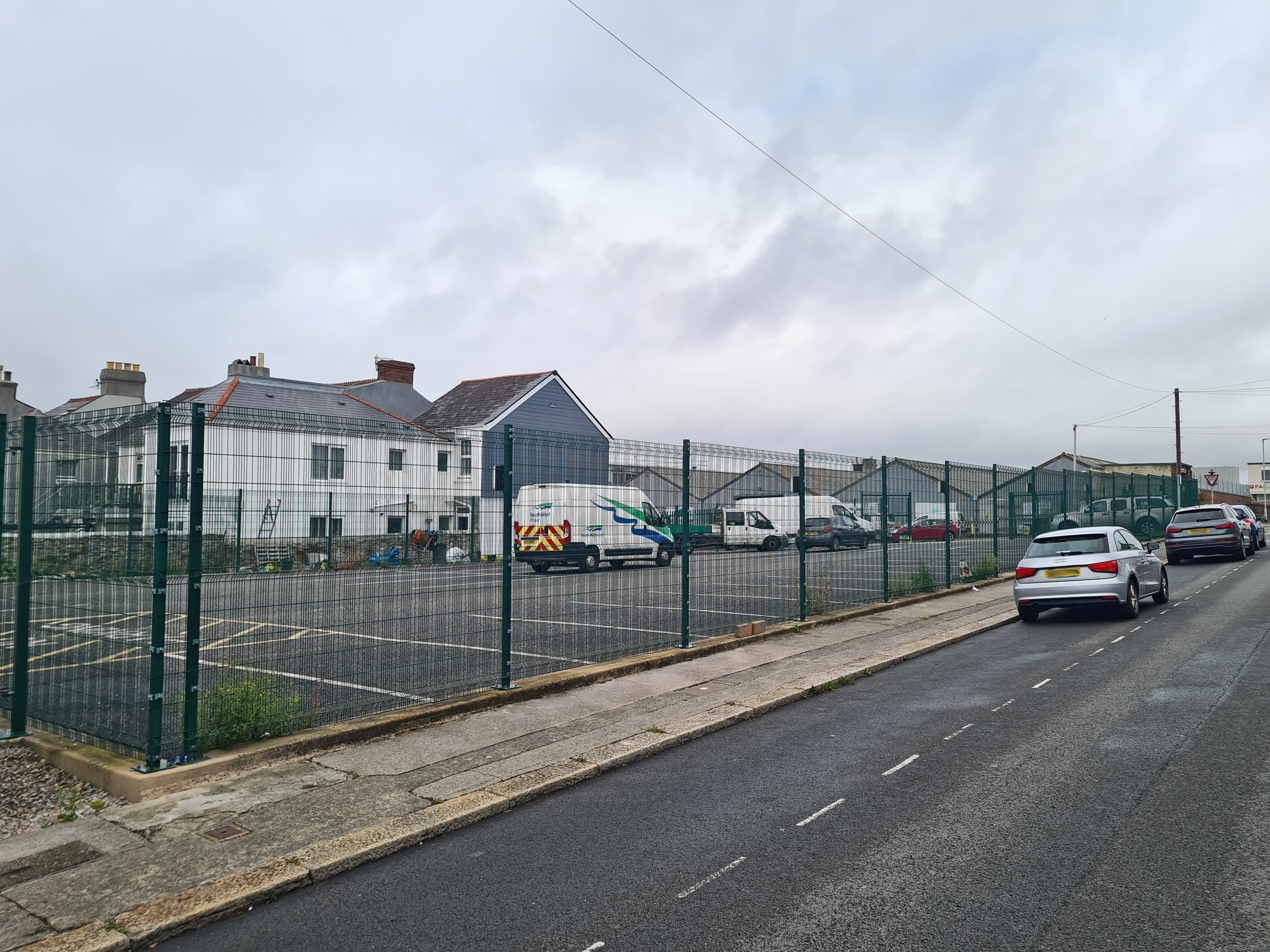
The site of the church is now a car park.

On 12 June 2007, the Church Commissioners approved the demolition of the building, which was carried out over the course of December 2007 and January 2008. A 2012 proposal to provide affordable housing on the site failed to come to fruition. In 2015, Western Power Distribution received planning permission to use the site as an overflow car park.

== Architecture ==
The 1899 red brick section of St Mary's had a stone carving above its door depicting the Crucifixion of Jesus. It was sculptured in Doulting stone by Mr. Trevennen and gifted to the church by John Shelly, a former churchwarden of St John's. The rest of the church was built in local limestone, with granite buttresses and dressings, and Delabole slate on the roof. A bell-cot was positioned over the south entrance. No timber was used in the roof and groined ceiling; reinforced concrete was used instead.
