= Centromerus cornupalpis =

Scientific classification
- Domain: Eukaryota
- Kingdom: Animalia
- Phylum: Arthropoda
- Subphylum: Chelicerata
- Class: Arachnida
- Order: Araneae
- Infraorder: Araneomorphae
- Family: Linyphiidae
- Genus: Centromerus
- Species: C. cornupalpis

Binomial name
- Centromerus cornupalpis (O. P.-Cambridge, 1875)

Species of spider

Centromerus cornupalpis is a species of sheetweb spider in the family Linyphiidae. It is found in the USA and Canada. This species exhibits sexual dimorphism. Males are identifiable by the shape of the cymbium, radix, and possession of a long proximo-dorsal horn on the paracymbium. Females exhibit a narrow, smooth constricted scape that originates anteriorly to the postero-lateral corners of the epigynum.
