= Stonehouse Creek =

Coordinates: 50°22′17″N 4°9′50″W

Stonehouse Creek, in Plymouth (England), is also known as Stonehouse Lake (on many maps). The Creek was dominated by two military buildings, the Royal Naval Hospital and the Stoke Military Hospital, which faced each other.

Also located in the creek are the modern shipbuilding sheds occupied by the luxury motor-yacht firm Princess Yachts who employ hundreds of local tradesmen to construct and fit out expensive vessels. The creek now ends at Stonehouse Bridge (for many years a toll bridge) and to the north east the wide river bed which led up past Millbridge to Pennycomequick and beyond to the bottom of Ford Park Cemetery, was reclaimed and infilled in 1973 to provide the playing fields of Victoria Park and rugby pitches for Devonport High School for Boys.
