= Centromerus obenbergeri =

Scientific classification
- Kingdom: Animalia
- Phylum: Arthropoda
- Subphylum: Chelicerata
- Class: Arachnida
- Order: Araneae
- Infraorder: Araneomorphae
- Family: Linyphiidae
- Genus: Centromerus
- Species: C. obenbergeri

Binomial name
- Centromerus obenbergeri Kratochvíl & Miller, 1938

Species of spider

Centromerus obenbergeri is a species of spider in the family Linyphiidae. It is found in Montenegro.

== Distribution ==
This species is endemic to southern Montenegro. It has been recorded from several caves in the region, primarily around Cetinje and the Risan district. Key localities include the Lipska cave and Ladnica cave near Cetinje, the Jamutina cave in the Risan area, and another unspecified cave in southern Montenegro.
