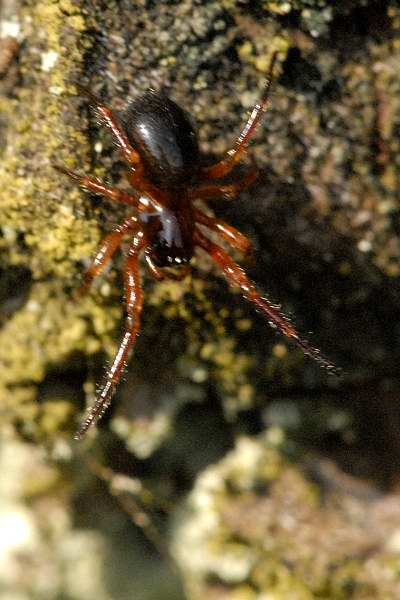

Conservation status
- Secure (NatureServe)

Scientific classification
- Kingdom: Animalia
- Phylum: Arthropoda
- Subphylum: Chelicerata
- Class: Arachnida
- Order: Araneae
- Infraorder: Araneomorphae
- Family: Linyphiidae
- Genus: Centromerus
- Species: C. sylvaticus

Binomial name
- Centromerus sylvaticus (Blackwall, 1841)

= Centromerus sylvaticus =

Species of spider

Centromerus sylvaticus is a species of sheetweb spider in the family Linyphiidae (money spiders). It is found in North America, Europe, Turkey, a range from Russia (European to Far East), China, Korea, and Japan.

Its length measures from 2.2-4mm. Its prosoma has a yellow-brown colour, with a dark margin in the head area. Its opisthosoma is grey or black. It has bright transverse lines.

== Subspecies ==
These two subspecies belong to the species Centromerus sylvaticus:

- (Centromerus sylvaticus sylvaticus) (Blackwall, 1841)
- Centromerus sylvaticus paucidentatus Deltshev, 1983
