= Plymouth Development Corporation =

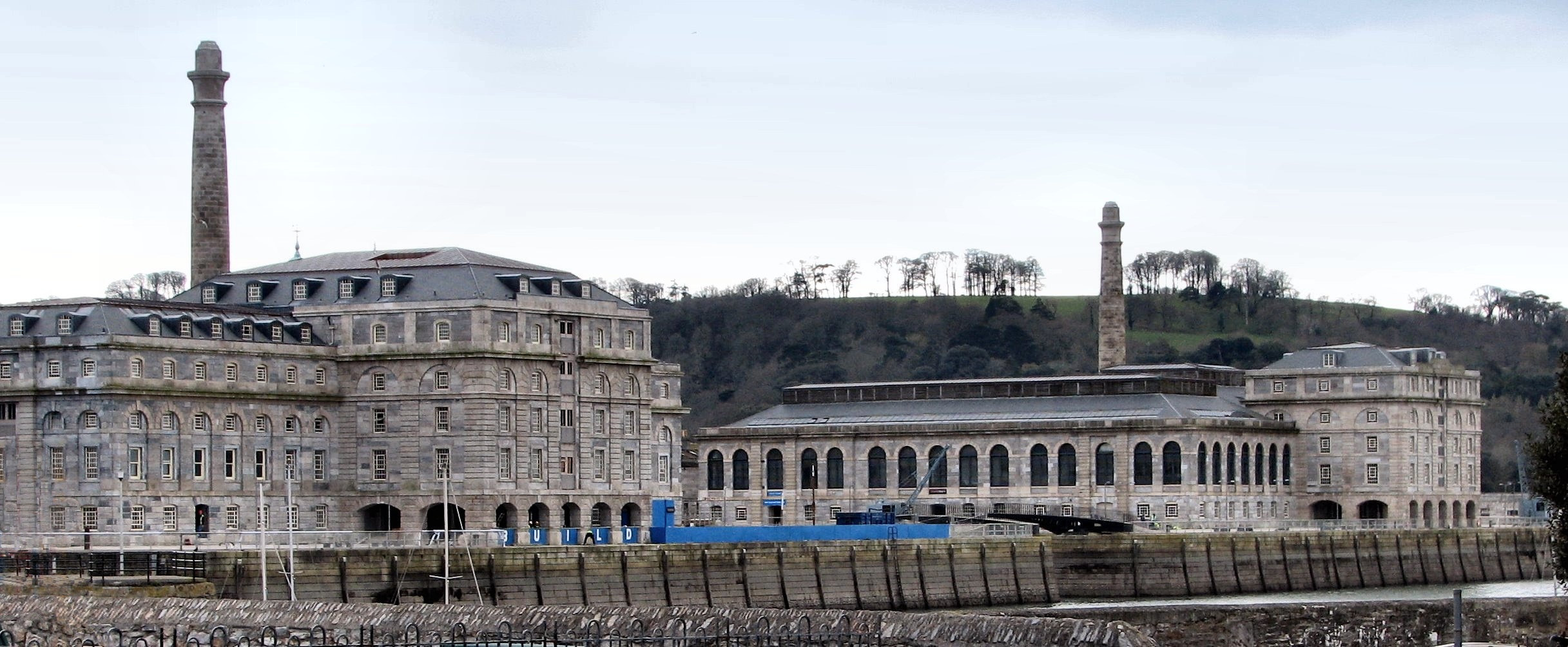
- The Royal William Victualling Yard – a major part of the corporation's responsibility
- Formation: 1993
- Dissolved: 1998
- Headquarters: Plymouth
- Chair: Sir Robert Gerken
- Chief executive: John Collinson; Geoff Timbrell
- Budget: £45 million

The Plymouth Development Corporation (or PDC) was an urban development corporation established in Plymouth, Devon, England by the UK Government on 1 April 1993 to "secure the physical, environmental, economic and social regeneration" of surplus parts of the Ministry of Defence's estate and some adjoining land. It had an indicative budget of £45 million and a lifetime of five years. Although subject to criticism for financial irregularities, it laid the foundation for improvements that continued for several years after it was wound up.

== Formation ==
The PDC was given an indicative budget of £45 million to be spent over its proposed five-year lifetime; in 1994 its corporate plan stated that it had the potential to create over 1,300 new jobs and lever in private sector finance of some £50 million. It was the twelfth development corporation to be set up in the country, and it was created after the dockyard, the traditional major employer in the city of Plymouth, had reduced its workforce from 30,000 to 5,000, resulting in an unemployment rate of 14% in the city. The chairman was Vice-Admiral Sir Robert Gerken, a former Flag Officer at Plymouth, with deputy John Ingham, leader of Plymouth City Council.

== The sites and plans ==
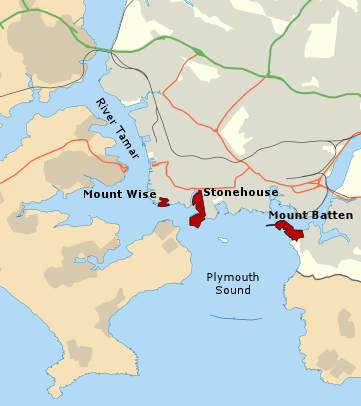
A map of Plymouth showing the three designated areas in red

Three sites were designated and they were all on the waterfront. They were: part of Stonehouse, including the Royal William Victualling Yard (31 hectares); the nearby Mount Wise area (5 hectares); and Mount Batten on the other side of Plymouth Sound (31 hectares). MoD land at all three sites was transferred to the PDC.

The Royal William Victualling Yard was built in the early 19th century and is one of the country's most architecturally significant groups of maritime buildings, all Grade I listed. Development of the Yard was the single largest aspect of the corporation's remit, and the improvement of its poor road access was also important, as was the provision of sufficient car parking. Much of the Mount Wise site was derelict and was considered to be ideal for light industrial, commercial and residential development, the latter helped by its fine views across the River Tamar to Mount Edgcumbe Country Park. The Mount Batten site had been used by the Royal Air Force until 1992, and although a large part was already designated as a scheduled monument, opportunity was seen for some residential and leisure development.

== Financial irregularities ==
The chief executive of the PDC was John Collinson, former property director of the Black Country Development Corporation. He was suspended from his post in June 1995—and he resigned in September—after it was reported by the Public Accounts Committee that he had spent over £9,000 of the corporation's money on his own private expenses during visits abroad, though he did repay the money.

The committee also censured the corporation for "poor stewardship of public funds" and said that it had "lost control over the expenditure of public funds". However one of the companies that had been criticised by the Public Accounts Committee complained that its report contained errors and not all the evidence had not been considered. Following this, the National Audit Office, which had provided much of the evidence for the report, admitted that some of the involved parties had not been spoken to directly. Following a spell during which David Woodhall was acting chief executive, Collinson was formally replaced in early 1996 by Geoff Timbrell who had been the head of property at the London Docklands Development Corporation.

== Results ==
By October 1996, The Times was reporting that the PDC had made little real progress. A year later, the corporation announced that MEPC plc, at the time the country's third largest property development company, had submitted a planning proposal for the Royal William Yard to include a 120,000 sq ft factory outlet retail centre based on its successful Clarks Village in Somerset. Expected to be completed in three years, the project was anticipated to create 500 new jobs and attract over 2 million visitors in its first year, boosting the city's economy by £40m. However English Heritage criticised the plans as being "fundamentally in conflict with the character of the architecture", and MEPC pulled out of the deal in September 1998. Although several proposals were made by other companies, none had come to fruition by 2000.

After the PDC was dissolved in 1998, the National Audit Office reported that during its lifetime it had built 11,900 m^{2} (128,000 sq ft) of commercial floor space and 99 homes. Private sector finance amounting to £8m had been leveraged in and 427 new jobs created. About 3 miles (4.8 km) of new road and footpaths were put in place. A local newspaper reported that at the Royal William Yard the PDC had installed or reinstalled all main services, including telephone and data. It had also restored the swing bridge and refurbished the Brewhouse, and improved the road access to the yard. Following the winding-up of the corporation, responsibility for the Royal William Victualling Yard devolved to the South West of England Regional Development Agency.

At Mount Batten, the corporation built an access road costing £2m and redeveloped the headland with car parking, a safe public space with toilet facilities and an amphitheatre. The company responsible for much of the work reported that the former use of the site as a Royal Air Force station and flying boat base had caused considerable ground pollution which necessitated extensive decontamination works before construction could begin.

The expenditure at Mount Wise included around £5 million (including £3.8 million from the Heritage Lottery Fund) to improve the waterfront, refurbish the salt water swimming pools and develop the urban park, which included the construction of a landmark feature with a 40m high mast and viewing platform, as well as the conservation of the park's historic redoubt and Scott Memorial. Most of this work was complete by 2000.

In 2000, Plymouth City Council's Archaeology Unit published the results of the archaeological and historical investigations and recording programmes that had taken place alongside the regeneration works.

== Sources ==
- Scott Wilson Kirkpatrick, Consulting Engineers (February 1995). Stonehouse Environmental Assessment. Plymouth Development Corporation.
