= Centromerus persolutus =

Scientific classification
- Domain: Eukaryota
- Kingdom: Animalia
- Phylum: Arthropoda
- Subphylum: Chelicerata
- Class: Arachnida
- Order: Araneae
- Infraorder: Araneomorphae
- Family: Linyphiidae
- Genus: Centromerus
- Species: C. persolutus

Binomial name
- Centromerus persolutus (O. P.-Cambridge, 1875)

Species of spider

Centromerus persolutus is a species of sheetweb spider in the family Linyphiidae. It is found in the Northeast United States and Canada.
