= Stonehouse, Plymouth =

Area of Plymouth, Devon, England

Coordinates: 50.3708°N 4.1625°W

Stonehouse
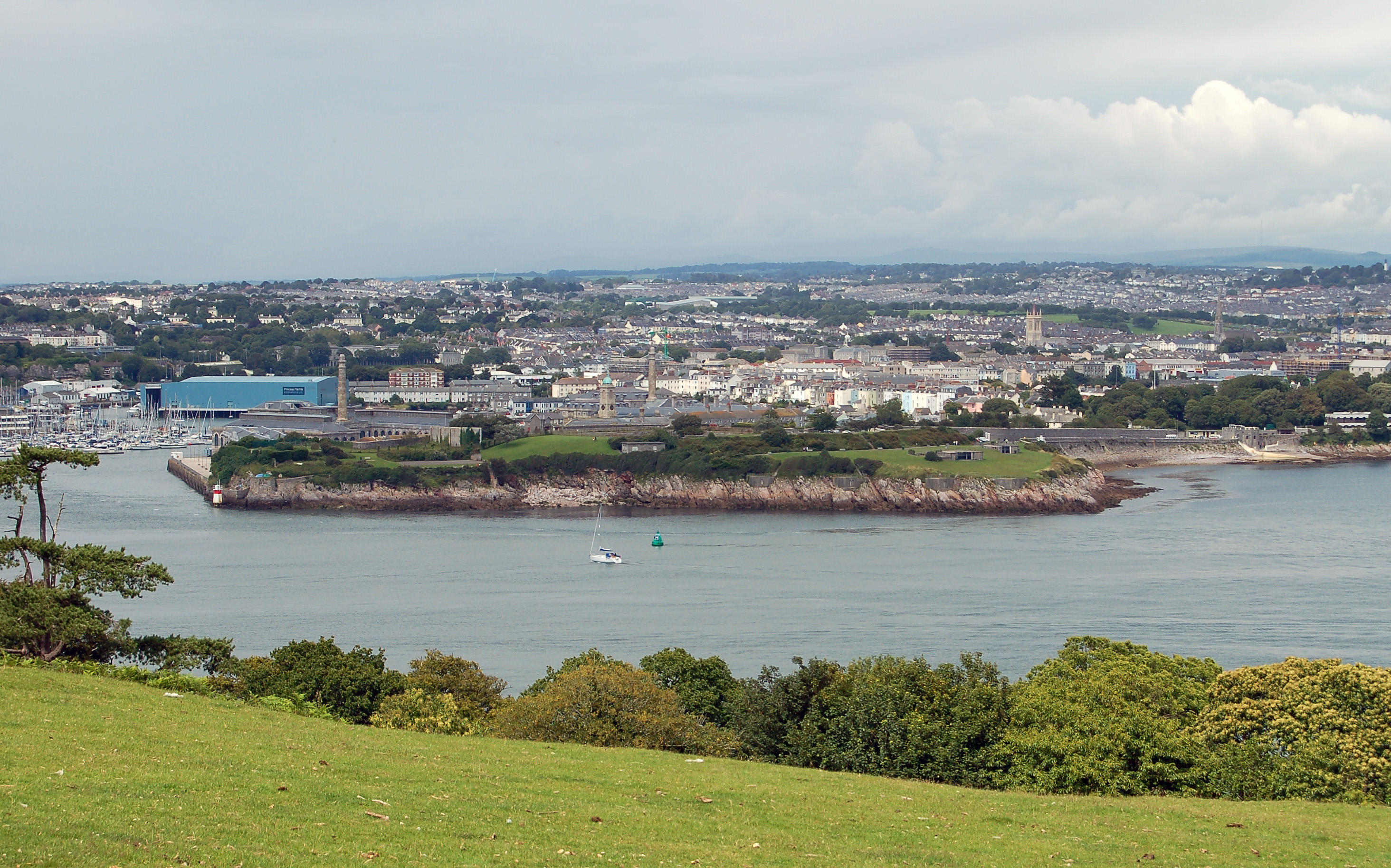
- Stonehouse from Mount Edgcumbe

- Location within Devon
- Unitary authority: Plymouth
- Ceremonial county: Devon
- Region: South West
- Country: England
- Sovereign state: United Kingdom
- Post town: PLYMOUTH
- Postcode district: PL1 3xx
- Dialling code: 01752
- Police: Devon and Cornwall
- Fire: Devon and Somerset
- Ambulance: South Western

East Stonehouse was one of three towns that were amalgamated into modern-day Plymouth, in the ceremonial county of Devon, England. West Stonehouse was a village that is within the current Mount Edgcumbe Country Park in Cornwall. It was destroyed by the French in 1350. The terminology used in this article refers to the settlement of East Stonehouse which is on the Devon side of the mouth of the Tamar estuary, and will be referred to as Stonehouse.

== History ==
Stonehouse Water Supply Act 1592
- Act of Parliament
- Parliament of England
- Long title: An Act for the bringing in of a fresh stream into the town of Stonehowse in the county of Devon.
- Citation: 35 Eliz. 1. c. 10 Pr.
- Territorial extent: England and Wales

Dates
- Royal assent: 10 April 1593
- Commencement: 18 February 1593 (Note: Start of session.)
- Repealed: 29 July 1915

Other legislation
- Repealed by: Plymouth Corporation Act 1915

Status: Repealed

Settlement in the area goes back to Roman times and a house made of stone was believed to have stood near to Stonehouse Creek. However other stories relate to land owned in the 13th century by Robert the Bastard. This land subsequently passed from the Durnford family, through marriage, to the Edgecombe family in the 14th and 15th centuries. The site of the original settlement of Stonehouse is now mostly occupied by the complex of Princess Yachts.

During the 17th, 18th and 19th centuries the areas of Emma Place and Caroline Place were home to many of the west country's top-ranking admirals, doctors and clergy. Those streets together with Millbay Road used to form Plymouth's red light district. Union Street, originally built across marshland, was for almost a century the centre of the city's night life with about a hundred pubs, a music hall and many other attractions. Much of it was destroyed by bombing in World War II. After the war the area between Union Street and the dock has been used by small factories, storage, car dealers and repairers. For decades it remained underdeveloped compared with other parts of Plymouth.

=== Bone Caves ===
In 1835, caves containing fossilised bones were discovered in Stonehouse. Further caves were found around the city in the 19th and 20th centuries including those at Cattedown, Oreston, and Turnchapel.

=== Administrative history ===
Stonehouse was historically a chapelry of the parish of Plymouth St Andrew's, covering the part of the parish which lay outside Plymouth's borough boundaries. Stonehouse was made a separate parish in 1746. The parish of East Stonehouse was made a local government district in 1872, governed by a local board. Such local boards were reconstituted as urban district councils in 1894.

East Stonehouse Urban District was abolished in 1914, being absorbed into the county borough of Plymouth, along with neighbouring Devonport. East Stonehouse remained a civil parish until 1 April 1974, but as an urban parish it had no practical functions, being directly administered by Plymouth Corporation. In 1951 the parish had a population of 7770.

== Notable buildings ==
Significant buildings include the Royal William Victualling Yard, the Royal Marine Barracks, Stonehouse and the Royal Naval Hospital, Stonehouse. Of these three defence complexes only the Barracks remain in Naval possession.

During the reign of Henry VII defences at the mouth of the Tamar were strengthened by the building of cannon-bearing towers. One of these, the Artillery Tower at the sea end of Durnford Street, has been preserved and is now a restaurant.

Two of the surviving buildings close to the dock at Millbay are the red brick Portland stone-faced Georgian assembly room that is still called the Long Room, and the exquisite late Georgian or early Victorian Globe Theatre 300 metres north within the barracks.

On the higher ground towards North Road are two major churches. Firstly the Anglican St Peter's with its tall spire in the centre of Georgian style Wyndham Square. A few hundred metres east is the mid Victorian Roman Catholic cathedral of St Mary and St Boniface (1858).

During 1882, Arthur Conan Doyle worked as a newly qualified physician at 1 Durnford Street, East Stonehouse. Plaques bearing passages from his works featuring Sherlock Holmes have since been set into the pavement in Durnford Street.

== Demographics ==
The 1841 census gives the population as 9,712 inhabitants.

Stonehouse has 29.1% of the working age population claiming benefits and has the highest death rate for Cancer, CHD, COPD and Stroke in Plymouth. Stonehouse is part of the St. Peter and the Waterfront ward; the most deprived ward in Plymouth and in the 1% most disadvantaged districts in England.

== Regeneration ==
Between 1993 and 1998 the part of Stonehouse to the west of Durnford Street (including the Royal William Victualling Yard) was designated as one of the three areas of the city under control of Plymouth Development Corporation. Gradually affluent residents are moving back into the district which has been comparatively poor since the Great War. Durnford Street is being regentrified. The former Naval Hospital (adjacent to the Millfields – formerly part of Stonehouse Creek) is a gated community with security guards. However, Royal William Yard, also a walled site, welcomes the public freely (apart from car parking charges) to its increasing number of food outlets, and has part of the South West Coast Path running through it, using a staircase specially constructed in 2013. In 2013 a marina was opened within Millbay Docks.

On Stonehouse Creek, a branch of the Tamar, off the estuary known as the Hamoaze are the modern shipbuilding sheds occupied by the luxury motor-yacht firm Princess Yachts who employ hundreds of local tradesmen to construct and fit out expensive vessels. The creek now ends at Stonehouse Bridge (for many years a toll bridge) and to the north east the wide river bed which led up past Millbridge to Pennycomequick and beyond to the bottom of Ford Park Cemetery, was reclaimed and infilled in 1973 to provide the playing fields of Victoria Park and rugby pitches for Devonport High School for Boys.

Stonehouse is the site of Plymouth's international ferry port at Millbay with at least daily sailings to Roscoff in Brittany (except in winter) and frequent ferries to Santander in northern Spain.

There is a regular passenger ferry from the tidal landing Admiral's Hard to Cremyll in Cornwall which is used by visitors to the Mount Edgcumbe Country Park, and commuters to Plymouth.

== Notable people ==
- Thomas Bainbrigge Fletcher (1878–1950), entomologist
- Alexander Copland Hutchison FRSE surgeon and medical author
- John Eastman Palmer – photographer
- William Eastman Palmer – 19th-century photographer
- Caroline Ganley – member of parliament
