= Centrophantes =

Scientific classification
- Kingdom: Animalia
- Phylum: Arthropoda
- Subphylum: Chelicerata
- Class: Arachnida
- Order: Araneae
- Infraorder: Araneomorphae
- Family: Linyphiidae
- Genus: Centrophantes; Miller & Polenec, 1975

Type species
- C. crosbyi (Fage & Kratochvíl, 1933)

Species
- C. crosbyi (Fage & Kratochvíl, 1933) – Slovenia; C. roeweri (Wiehle, 1961) – Austria, Slovenia

Genus of spiders

Centrophantes is a genus of European dwarf spiders that was first described by F. Miller & A. Polenec in 1975. As of May 2019 it contains only two species: C. crosbyi and C. roeweri.
