= Royal Naval Hospital, Stonehouse =

Former British hospital

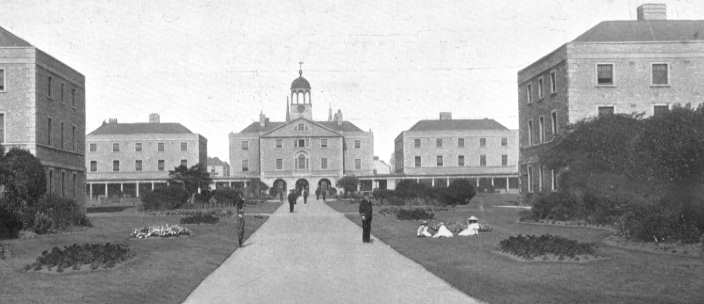
- Royal Naval Hospital, Stonehouse, in 1897.

Location
- Location within Devon
- Coordinates: 50.3722°N 4.1580°W

Site history
- Built: 1758-1765
- Built for: Sick and Hurt Commissioners
- In use: 1765-1995

The Royal Naval Hospital, Stonehouse was a medical facility for naval officers and other ranks at Stonehouse, Plymouth. It was opened in 1760, so becoming the second Royal Naval Hospital in Great Britain (after RNH Haslar, which had first received patients some seven years earlier). When in operation, it was officially known as Royal Hospital, Plymouth (or Royal Naval Hospital, Plymouth).

The hospital closed in 1995; it is now a gated residential complex called The Millfields. The 26-acre (11 ha) site is a conservation area, containing over 20 listed buildings and structures. The main quadrangle is described as 'a complex of outstanding historical significance in the development of institutions for the care of the sick, which forms the principal part of a remarkable and complete military hospital'.

== History ==
=== Overview ===
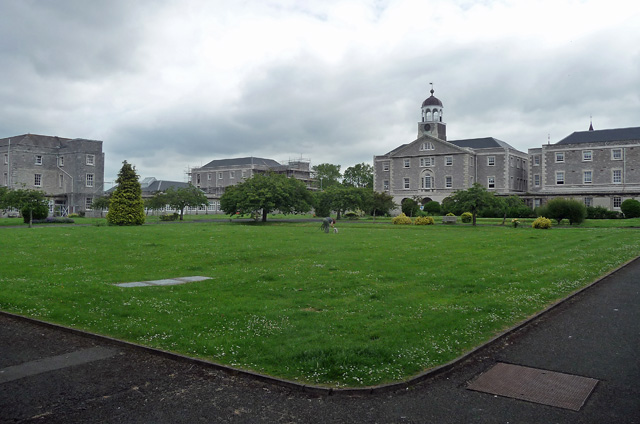
The main quadrangle (now flats). The cupola contains a clock of 1776 by Grignion & Son of Covent Garden.

The hospital was built between 1758 and 1765 to a design by the little-known Alexander Rovehead. When first opened, it stood on the edge of Stonehouse Creek in relative isolation, close to the village of Stonehouse to the west of Plymouth. The site for the hospital was formerly known as the mill fields (after the nearby tide mills on the creek). Towards the end of the century, Stoke Military Hospital was built by the Army, facing the naval hospital directly across the creek.

=== Design ===
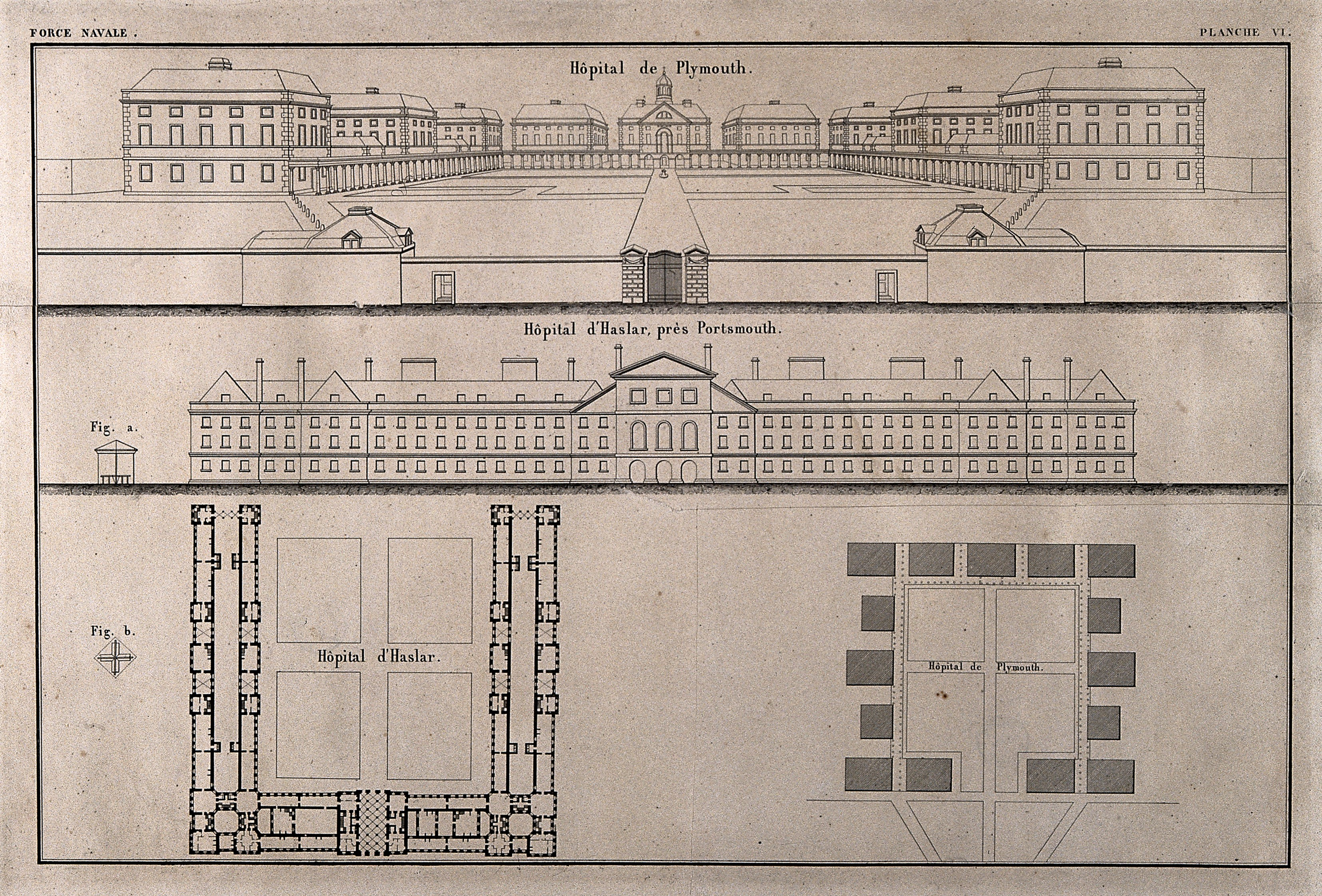
A comparison of the naval hospitals at Haslar (centre and bottom left) and Plymouth (top and bottom right), the former with its wards connected end-to-end, the latter with separate pavilions.

The design of Plymouth's Royal Naval Hospital was highly influential in its time (and has since been called 'revolutionary', 'pioneering' and 'of international importance'). Its pattern of detached wards (arranged so as to maximise ventilation and minimise spread of infection) foreshadowed the 'pavilion' style of hospital building which was popularised by Florence Nightingale a century later. In the eighteenth century Plymouth's new hospital was highly praised by (among others) John Howard, Jacques-René Tenon and Charles-Augustin de Coulomb. In 1788 Tenon described it as 'the most perfect [hospital] for its intended purpose that we have known', and it went on to have a direct influence on both the conceptual design and practical construction of hospitals, especially in Britain and in France.

=== Layout ===
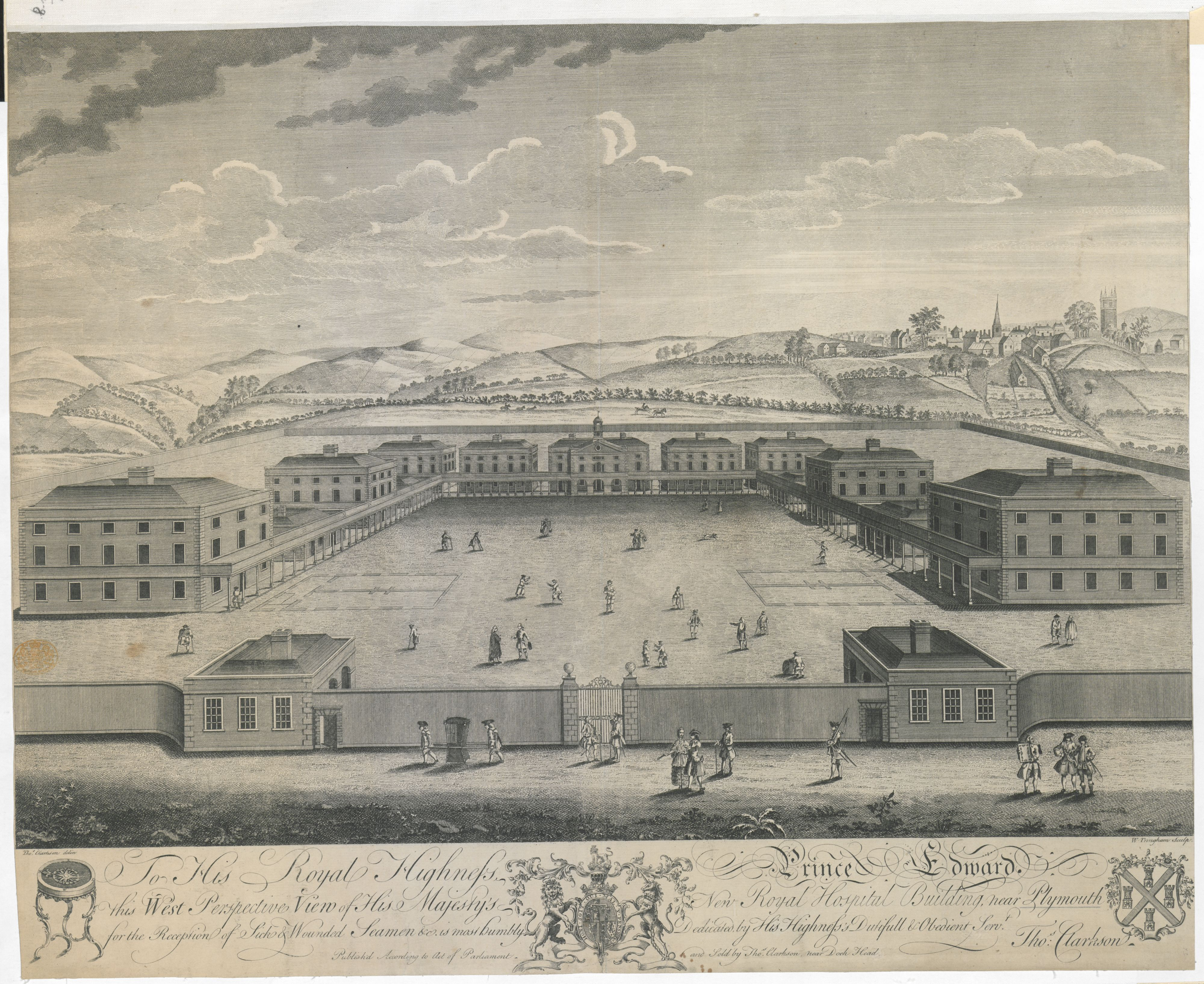
An 18th-century engraving of 'His Majesty's New Royal Hospital Building, near Plymouth'. (N.B. to provide a clearer view, only the floor-plan of the two nearest ward blocks is shown.)

The hospital housed up to 1,200 patients in sixty wards. These were contained in ten three-storey ward blocks arranged around a square courtyard (designed to serve as a spacious exercise ground for convalescing patients). Centrally placed on the east side, directly opposite the entrance to the quadrangle, was an eleventh block, which housed the dispensary and dispenser's apartments, and above them a chapel (lit by a large venetian window), where divine service was offered every Sunday. There were also four single-story 'pavilions' around the quadrangle (located between the ward blocks on the north and south sides). These appear to have been designed as cooking and victualling rooms, but before long they began to be put to other uses; in the later 18th century one was serving as a smallpox ward and another as a storehouse. A Tuscan colonnade provided a continuous covered walkway around the edge of the quadrangle, linking the fifteen blocks. Until the mid-1790s there was no separate operating theatre in the hospitals; surgery was performed in the wards (much to the 'offence' of other patients, according to contemporary reports). Later, an operating room was set up in one of the four single-story blocks between the wards.

New patients usually arrived by boat, landing directly from Stonehouse Creek (which was infilled in the 1970s and is now playing fields); the remains of a jetty can still be seen, flanked by stone steps which formerly descended into the creek. From here an entrance arch led to receiving wards (with a bath room and a clothing store) where new arrivals were washed and provided with clean bedclothes.

West of the main quadrangle, facing the central block with its cupola, were a pair of gates flanked by lodges, which contained offices for the Agent and the Steward (who between them were responsible for the finances, stores, provisions and personnel of the hospital). Beyond these, in 1763 Rovehead built a pedimented terrace of houses, providing accommodation for the four senior officers of the hospital (the surgeon, the physician, the steward and the agent), who together formed the Council which governed the hospital in its early years (on behalf of the Sick and Hurt Board). At this time the Physician was the chief officer of the establishment. Behind the officers' terrace were stables and another set of houses for two clerks (who assisted the agent and the steward).

The Navy's Sick & Hurt Board received a request from Mr Raggett, Dispenser, Plymouth Hospital December 24, 1772 for a supply of medicines and necessaries which Messers Cookworthy were ordered to supply with Raggett being instructed to only purchase those he did not already have in store.

In 1795 a Governor (a post-captain) was appointed to oversee the hospital, with two Lieutenants to serve as his deputies; none of them had medical responsibilities, instead they were appointed to maintain naval discipline among the patients. Subsequently, in 1804, two sets of residences were built facing each other across the green in front of the officers' terrace: one contained a pair of houses (for the Governor and the second physician), the other contained three (for the second surgeon and two lieutenants). At the same time another detached house was built nearby for the chaplain.

Directly opposite the water gate (with its jetty) was the main entrance from the street, which was flanked by a pair of lodges which provided accommodation for officers of the Royal Marine detachment which provided a guard for the Hospital; the Marines themselves were accommodated in a small barracks just outside the gate, similar in design to the nearby (and near-contemporary) Stonehouse Royal Marine Barracks. Later, police took over guard duty, and the barracks became a police station; in 1911 the main gate was shifted a hundred yards to the south, which brought the barracks within the main perimeter.

A water tower on the eastern edge of the site provided a pressured supply to the wards and to water closets around the site: an early example of a pressurised water sanitation system. It was supplied from a nearby reservoir

=== Later additions and arrangements ===
==== 19th century ====
During the Napoleonic Wars the hospital was overseen by a Governor and three lieutenants; the senior officers included two physicians and two surgeons, the agent, the steward, a chaplain and a dispenser. There were also two assistant physicians and three assistant surgeons on the staff. Patients were attended by untrained female nurses (between fifty and a hundred were employed at this time, depending on the number of patients in residence), though the washing of patients was undertaken by (male) labourers, who also had a variety of other jobs around the site.

The number of beds in each ward had by this time been reduced from twenty to fourteen, but in an emergency extra beds could be added meaning that the hospital could still accommodate up to 1,200 patients. Between 1800 and 1815, a total of 48,452 seamen and marines were admitted as patients, 'a very great proportion of whom returned to the service as effective men'. In addition, the hospital served (along with RNH Haslar) as a 'grand depot for medicines and medical stores, &c. for the English naval shipping'.

In 1826 a burial ground was established on a parcel of land to the north-east of the hospital site, and a gate was opened in the boundary wall (by the water tower) to provide access; later a mortuary chapel was built, just inside the gate. A new hospital chapel was provided in 1883 with the dedication Church of the Good Shepherd, placed east of the main quadrangle on the main east-west axis. At around the same time, the wash house on the northern edge of the site was expanded to serve as a laundry, with the addition of a sizeable boiler house alongside.

In 1840 the naval rank of Physician was abolished and replaced with that of Inspector (later Inspector-General) of Hospitals and Fleets. At the same time a Resident Commissioner (later styled Captain-Superintendent) replaced the Governor of the hospital. The executive officers (Captain-Superintendent and Lieutenants) were removed from naval hospitals in 1870, whereupon the Inspector-General (as the hospital's principal medical officer) took on oversight of the establishment.

In 1854 the Navy removed female nurses from its hospitals and replaced them with naval pensioners. Thirty years later these 'kindly but rough-and-ready male nurses' were replaced with trained cohorts of nursing sisters and sick berth staff.

==== 20th century ====
A significant expansion of facilities within the site took place from 1898-1906, with the addition of a sick officers' quarters beyond the chapel, staff quarters alongside it, a row of four zymotic ward blocks just north-east of the main quadrangle and a new dispensary (along with a house for the chief pharmacist) near the water gate. All these were built using distinctive yellow brick, which contrasts with the Plymouth limestone of the earlier buildings on the site.

During the Second World War a number of the buildings were damaged by aerial bombardment: between March and May of 1941, one ward block was destroyed, another was gutted and several residences and other buildings were damaged; but in spite of this and other attacks the hospital remained fully operational. In the course of the war a total of 60,282 patients were admitted. The wartime complement of staff (overseen by a Surgeon Rear-Admiral) included twenty-four medical officers and one dental officer, one or two matrons, thirty-two nursing sisters, 102 VADs under a VAD commandant, seven warrant wardmasters and 334 sick berth staff (with civilian administrative staff and labourers in addition). The hospital also served as a training centre during the war for sick berth staff and VAD nurses.

After the war the hospital continued in service as a naval hospital until 1995.

=== Closure and redevelopment ===
In 1993, in the wake of the government's Options for Change review, the decision was taken to close RNH Plymouth (along with a number of other military hospitals in the UK). The closing ceremony took place on 15 March 1995.

In 2000 work began on converting the site's historic buildings for mixed residential and business use. (Conversion of the old dispensary, which was the final block to be repurposed, took place in 2017).

The eastern end of the site (the chapel and surrounding buildings) was initially taken over by St Dunstan's Abbey Girls' School. In 2004 St Dunstan's merged with Plymouth College, which used the site for its preparatory school until 2021. In 2023 a new school opened on the vacated site, which includes the former chapel and staff quarters building. (The nearby sick officers' block, which had been converted into a boarding house by Plymouth College, was sold in 2018 and converted into apartments).
