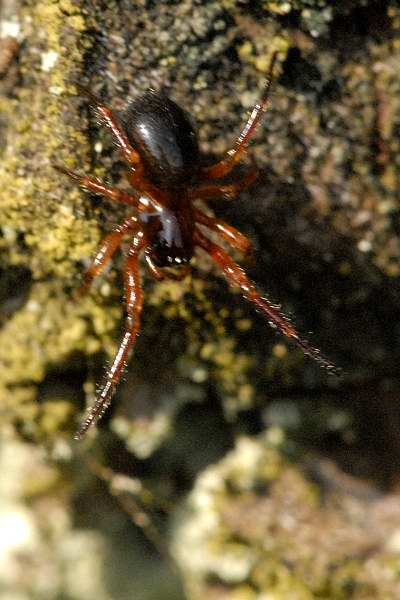
- C. sylvaticus

Scientific classification
- Kingdom: Animalia
- Phylum: Arthropoda
- Subphylum: Chelicerata
- Class: Arachnida
- Order: Araneae
- Infraorder: Araneomorphae
- Family: Linyphiidae
- Genus: Centromerus; Dahl, 1886

Type species
- C. brevipalpus (Menge, 1866)

Species
- 86, see text

Synonyms
- Atopogyna Millidge, 1984

= Centromerus =

Genus of spiders

Centromerus is a genus of dwarf spiders that was first described by David B. Hirst in 1886.

== Species ==
As of May 2021 it contains eighty-eight species and two subspecies:

- C. abditus Gnelitsa, 2007 – Ukraine, Russia (Europe)
- C. acutidentatus Deltshev, 2002 – Balkans
- C. albidus Simon, 1929 – Europe, Turkey
- C. amurensis Eskov & Marusik, 1992 – Russia (South Siberia to Far East)
- C. andrei Dresco, 1952 – Spain
- C. andriescui Weiss, 1987 – Romania
- C. anoculus Wunderlich, 1995 – Madeira
- C. arcanus (O. Pickard-Cambridge, 1873) – Greenland, Europe, Russia (Europe to Middle Siberia)
- C. balazuci Dresco, 1952 – France
- C. bonaeviae Brignoli, 1979 – Italy (Sardinia)
- C. brevipalpus (Menge, 1866) (type) – Europe, Kazakhstan
- C. bulgarianus (Drensky, 1931) – Bulgaria
- C. capucinus (Simon, 1884) – Europe, Caucasus
- C. cavernarum (L. Koch, 1872) – Europe
- C. chappuisi Fage, 1931 – Romania
- C. cinctus (Simon, 1884) – France (Corsica), Algeria, Tunisia
- C. clarus (L. Koch, 1879) – Russia (Europe to Far East)
- C. cornupalpis (O. Pickard-Cambridge, 1875) – USA, Canada
- C. corsicus (Simon, 1910) – France (Corsica)
- C. cottarellii Brignoli, 1979 – Italy
- C. dacicus Dumitrescu & Georgescu, 1980 – Romania, Serbia
- C. denticulatus (Emerton, 1909) – USA
- C. desmeti Bosmans, 1986 – Morocco, Algeria, Spain (Majorca)
- C. dilutus (O. Pickard-Cambridge, 1875) – Europe
- C. europaeus (Simon, 1911) – Portugal, Spain, France, Algeria, Balkans
- C. fuerteventurensis Wunderlich, 1992 – Canary Is.
- C. furcatus (Emerton, 1882) – USA, Canada
- C. gatoi Ballarin & Pantini, 2020 – Italy
- C. gentilis Dumitrescu & Georgescu, 1980 – Romania
- C. hanseni Ballarin & Pantini, 2020 – Italy
- C. ictericus (Simon, 1929) – France
- C. incilium (L. Koch, 1881) – Europe, Russia (Europe to West Siberia)
- C. isaiai Bosmans, 2015 – France (mainland, Corsica), Italy (Sardinia)
- C. lakatnikensis (Drensky, 1931) – Hungary, Serbia, Macedonia, Bulgaria, Greece
- C. latidens (Emerton, 1882) – USA, Canada
- C. laziensis Hu, 2001 – China
- C. leruthi Fage, 1933 – Europe
- C. levitarsis (Simon, 1884) – Europe, Russia (Europe to South Siberia)
- C. longibulbus (Emerton, 1882) – USA
- C. marciai Bosmans & Gasparo, 2015 – Italy (Sardinia)
- C. mariannae Slowik, 2018 – Canada, USA
- C. milleri Deltshev, 1974 – Bulgaria
- C. minor Tanasevitch, 1990 – Turkey, Caucasus (Russia, Georgia, Armenia, Azerbaijan)
- C. minutissimus Merrett & Powell, 1993 – Britain, Germany
- C. nurgush Tanasevitch & Esyunin, 2013 – Russia (Europe)
- C. obenbergeri Kratochvíl & Miller, 1938 – Montenegro
- C. obscurus Bösenberg, 1902 – Central Europe
- C. pabulator (O. Pickard-Cambridge, 1875) – Europe
- C. pacificus Eskov & Marusik, 1992 – Russia (South Siberia to Far East)
- C. paradoxus (Simon, 1884) – Western Mediterranean
- C. pasquinii Brignoli, 1971 – Italy
- C. persimilis (O. Pickard-Cambridge, 1912) – Europe
- C. persolutus (O. Pickard-Cambridge, 1875) – USA, Canada
- C. petrovi Dimitrov & Deltshev, 2019 – Turkey
- C. phoceorum Simon, 1929 – Portugal, Spain, France, Madeira, Algeria, Tunisia
- C. piccolo Weiss, 1996 – Germany
- C. ponsi Lissner, 2016 – Spain (Balearic Is.)
- C. pratensis Gnelitsa & Ponomarev, 2010 – Russia (Europe)
- C. prudens (O. Pickard-Cambridge, 1873) – Europe, North Africa
  - Centromerus p. electus (Simon, 1884) – France
- C. puddui Brignoli, 1979 – Italy (Sardinia)
- C. qinghaiensis Hu, 2001 – China
- C. qingzangensis Hu, 2001 – China
- C. remotus Roewer, 1938 – Indonesia (Moluccas)
- C. satyrus (Simon, 1884) – France
- C. sellarius (Simon, 1884) – Europe, Russia (Europe to South Siberia)
- C. semiater (L. Koch, 1879) – Europe, Russia (Europe to Middle Siberia)
- C. serbicus Deltshev, 2002 – Serbia
- C. serratus (O. Pickard-Cambridge, 1875) – Europe
- C. setosus Miller & Kratochvíl, 1940 – Slovakia
- C. sexoculatus Wunderlich, 1992 – Madeira
- C. silvicola (Kulczyński, 1887) – Central Europe to Balkans and Ukraine
- C. sinuatus Bosmans, 1986 – Morocco, Algeria, Tunisia
- C. sinus (Simon, 1884) – Spain, France
- C. subalpinus Lessert, 1907 – Alps (France, Switzerland, Italy, Germany, Austria, Slovenia)
- C. subcaecus Kulczyński, 1914 – Europe
- C. succinus (Simon, 1884) – Western Mediterranean
- C. sylvaticus (Blackwall, 1841) – North America, Europe, Turkey, Russia (Europe to Far East), China, Korea, Japan
  - Centromerus s. paucidentatus Deltshev, 1983 – Bulgaria
- C. tennapex (Barrows, 1940) – USA
- C. terrigenus Yaginuma, 1972 – Russia (Sakhalin, Kurile Is.), Japan
- C. timidus (Simon, 1884) – Spain, Romania
- C. tongiorgii Ballarin & Pantini, 2020 – Italy
- C. tridentinus Caporiacco, 1952 – Italy
- C. trilobus Tao, Li & Zhu, 1995 – China
- C. truki Millidge, 1991 – Caroline Is.
- C. unicolor Roewer, 1959 – Turkey
- C. ussuricus Eskov & Marusik, 1992 – Russia (Far East)
- C. valkanovi Deltshev, 1983 – Bulgaria, Greece, Turkey
- C. variegatus Denis, 1962 – Madeira
