= Cattedown =

Suburb of Plymouth, Devon, England

Coordinates: 50.368808°N 4.113901°W

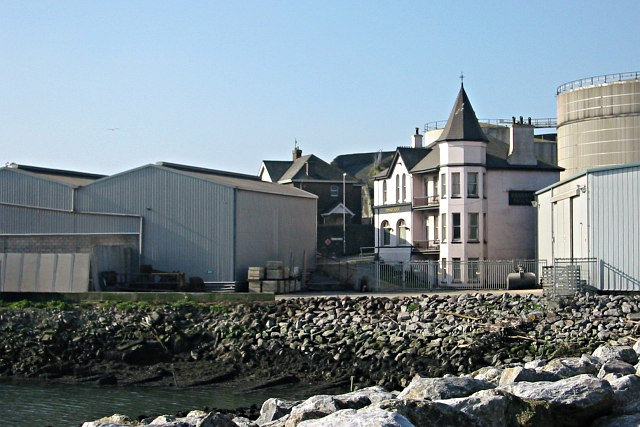

- Location within Devon
- Population: 9,331
- Unitary authority: Plymouth
- Ceremonial county: Devon
- Region: South West
- Country: England
- Sovereign state: United Kingdom
- Post town: PLYMOUTH
- Postcode district: PL
- Police: Devon and Cornwall
- Fire: Devon and Somerset
- Ambulance: South Western

Cattedown is an inner city suburb of Plymouth, Devon. Its position beside the River Plym estuary just short of the mouth led to its early settlement. It is believed that the name Cattedown (and the nearby Cattewater) originated from a rocky outcrop nearby on the River Plym that looked like a cat.

The area (including Prince Rock) as a population of 9,331 according to the 2011 census.

== History ==
=== 1600s–1800s ===
In the 1600s, Cattedown was home to quarries, the topsoil around the area was extensively excavated, especially after the discovery of the fossils in the area.

In 1816, caves containing human bones were discovered in Cattedown when a "bone bearing fissure" was found by a "Mr Whidbey", the caves were further discovered and excavated by two archaeologists in 1886 who discovered human bones while mining in a quarry. During the excavations traces of charcoal were found, leading archeologists to believe that early humans were living in the caves, and were potentially the first people to live in the Plymouth area. Bones of woolly rhinoceroses, reindeer, hyenas and a woolly mammoth from the ice age were also found.

Among the partial skeletons of 15 early humans found in the caves was the famous ‘Cattedown Man’ – believed to be the city's earliest known inhabitant and dating back 140,000 years. Archaeologists say he could potentially be the oldest human found in Britain.

Further caves were found around the city in the 20th century including those at Stonehouse, Oreston, and Turnchapel. Today, the caves – listed as a national monument by Historic England – remain fenced off and closed to the public.

=== 1900s ===
The area used to be served by a branch of the Plymouth to Yealmpton railway line, but closed to commuter traffic in 1947. The passenger services ceased on 6 October 1947, and cargo services ceased on 29 February 1960.

In 1991, Plymouth City Council began the Cattedown Regeneration Project which redeveloped 24 hectares (0.24 km^{2}) of brownfield land to the east of Sutton Harbour including Cattedown. The project included the construction of the a fish market at £3m in 1995, a new Government Office of the South West, and the National Marine Aquarium, as well as new infrastructure including additional roads and car parking.

=== 2000s–present ===
The former quarries are now home to the Valero Plymouth Terminal, a large gas tank farm.

In 2016, the critically endangered Horrid Ground-weaver spider was found in Cattedown, the spider has previously only been found in Plymouth and was recorded for the first time in the area. The spider only lives in limestone quarries in Plymouth, and cannot be found anywhere else in the world.

== Notable buildings ==
St Mary's Church was a Church of England church in Cattedown. It was built between 1911 and 1912 and was designed by Sir Charles Nicholson. The church closed in 1956, and was used for storage until it partly served as a church hall and community centre from 1990 and was demolished in 2007–08.

== Gallery ==
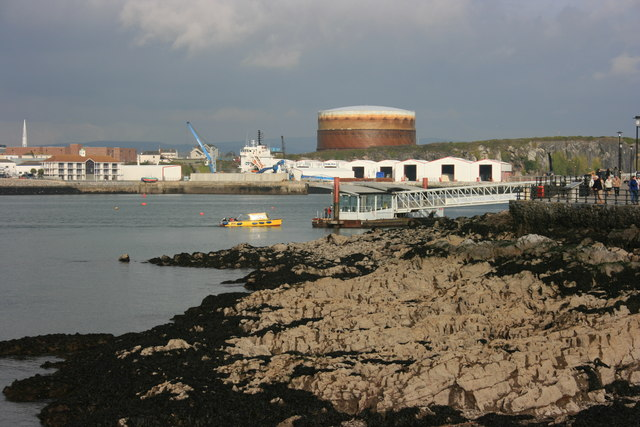
Cattedown from Mount Batten

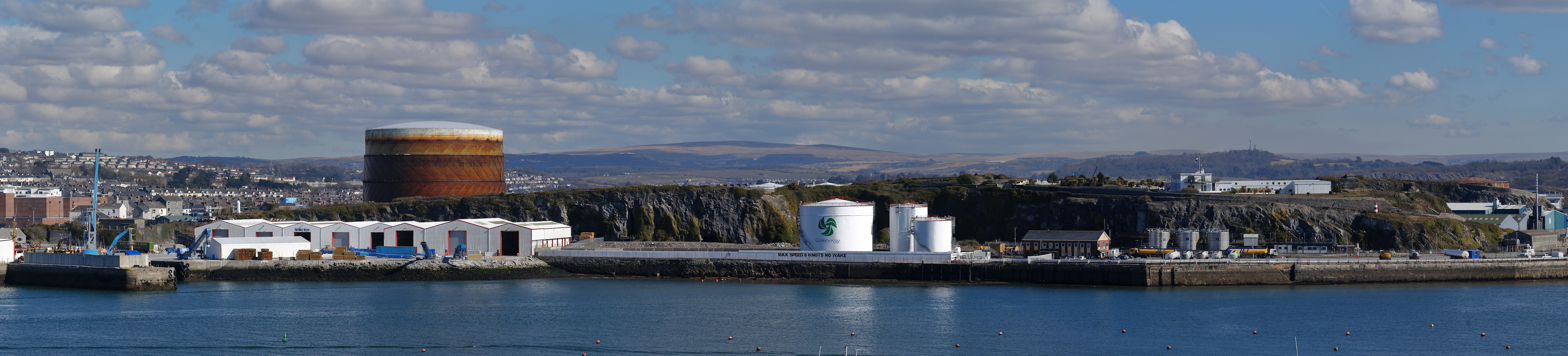
A panorama of the Cattedown docks area taken from Mount Batten

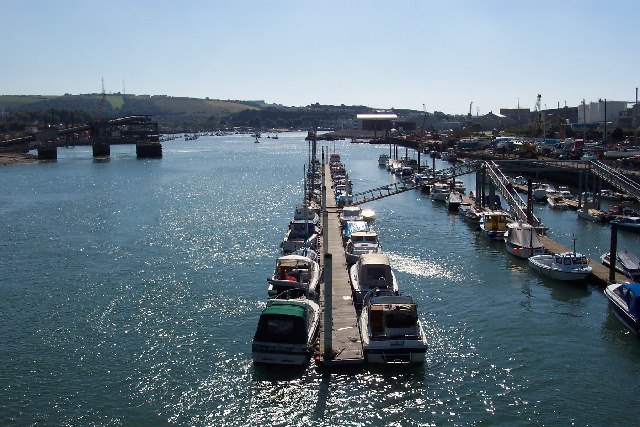
Cattewater

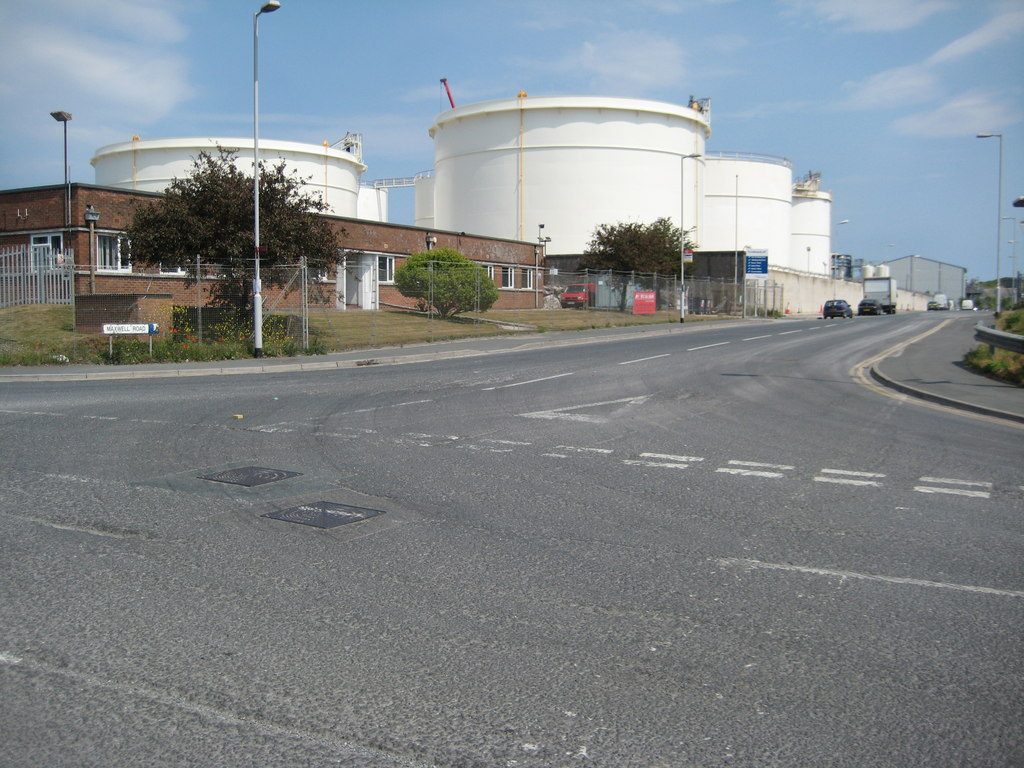
Fuel storage tanks in Cattedown

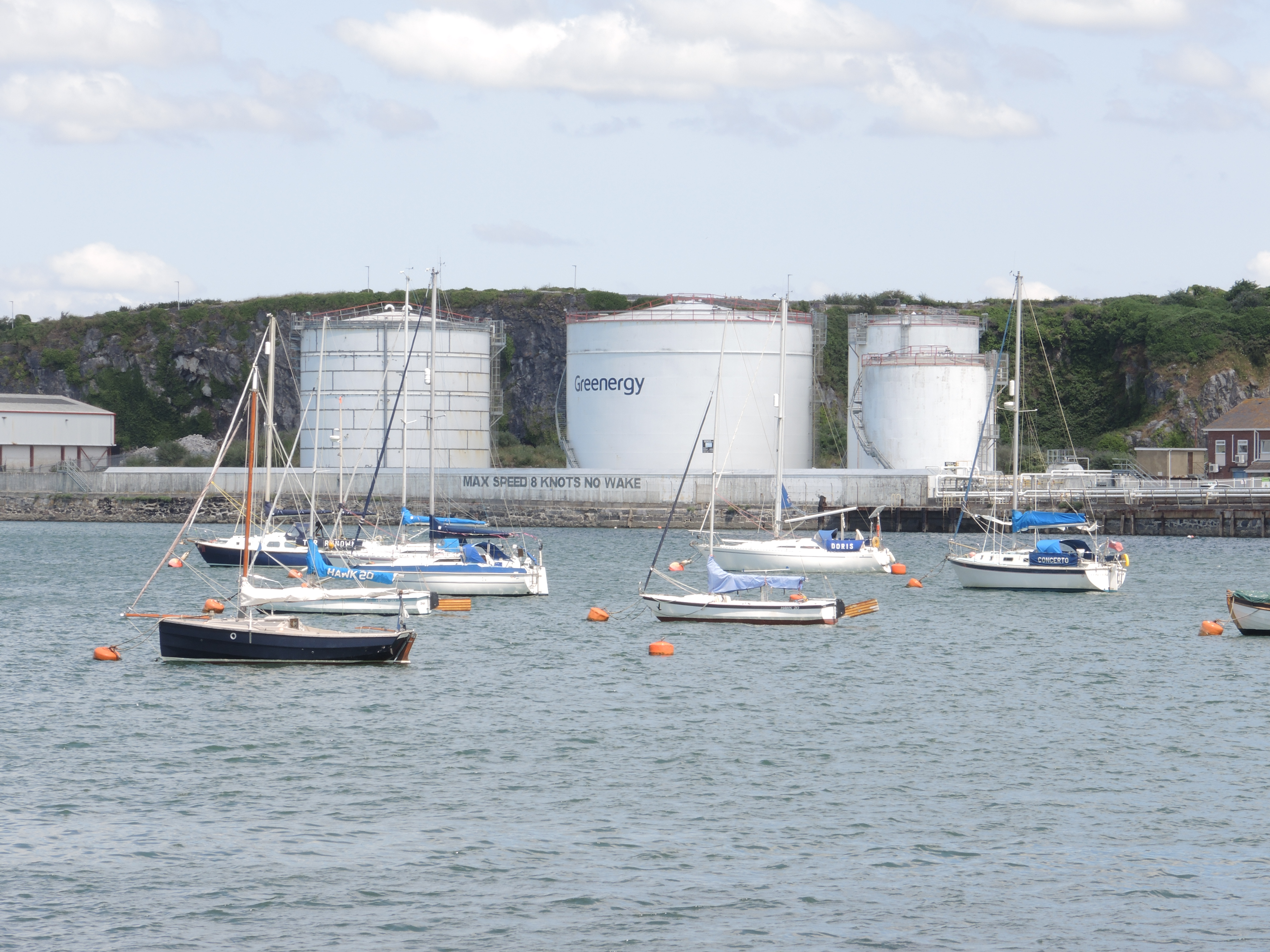
Fuel storage on Cattedown (from Cattewater)
