= Oreston =

Suburb of Plymouth, Devon

Coordinates: 50°21′39″N 4°06′35″W

Oreston (/ɜːˈrɛstʌn/ uh-RES-tun), formerly a village on the southern bank of the Cattewater, is now a suburb of Plymouth. It is recorded as Horestone on the 1591 Spry Map of Plimmouth. Oreston offers many small, local services. It is home to a small cornershop style shop called "The Quay News," a pub called "The King's Arms," a small dock and free public slipway in "Oreston Quay," and is home to approximately 3,000 residents.

The Oreston Quay, home of the Plym Yacht Club, plays host to many different events including carnivals, concerts and is also a perfect spot for a picnic. The South West Coast Path passes through the village. There is a well-established community with the inclusion of a school. This school has grown and developed over the last few years and has, in some ways, made the area more popular as a place to live.

== History ==
Famed for its limestone quarries, and the discovery of prehistoric remains of animals such as rhinos and lions, stone from which was used in the construction of Plymouth Breakwater, the name is assumed to derive from "ores town", or possibly "Hora's Tun", named after a Saxon tenant farmer who held the lease prior to the Norman Conquest. Trinity House based their depot at Oreston for the building of the fourth Eddystone Lighthouse

Oreston is home to two churches, the small Anglican Church of The Good Shepherd, part of the Parish of Plymstock and Hooe, which hosts weekly communions and services for seasonal holidays such as Christmas and Easter, which recently underwent reconstruction and now has a new roof, and the larger Oreston Methodist Church.

The village suffered some bomb damage during World War II but escaped the extensive destruction experienced by other parts of Plymouth.

=== Bone Caves ===
In 1816, caves containing fossilised bones were discovered in Oreston, the only ones in the United Kingdom at the time to undergo scientific investigations and archaeological digs. Further caves were found around the city in the 19th and 20th centuries including those at Cattedown, Stonehouse, and Turnchapel.

== Famous people ==
Alexander Selkirk, the man whose seafaring adventures inspired Daniel Defoe to write Robinson Crusoe, lived at Oreston for a while. Selkirk married Frances Candish, a pub landlady there in 1720, the year after Defoe's book was published.
