= Timeline of Exeter =

Coordinates: 50.716667°N 3.533333°W

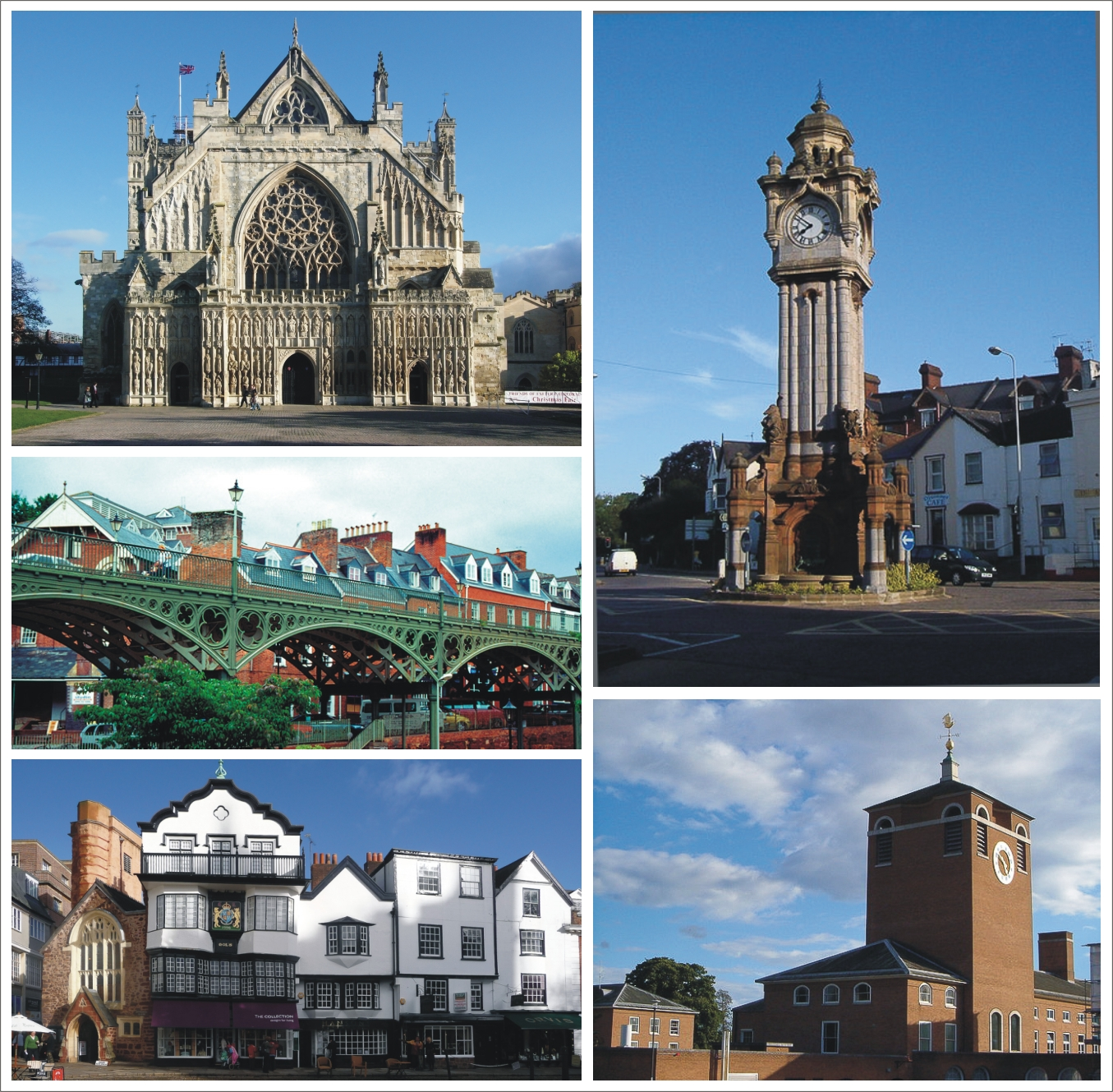
various constructions

The following is a timeline of the history of the city of Exeter, Devon, England.

== Prior to 16th century ==
- 250 BC – Goods traded with Roman coins
- 45 CE – Romans in power (approximate date).
- 55 – Roman fort established in Isca Dumnoniorum (approximate date).
- 380 – Roman occupation ends (approximate date).
- 600 – Saxons arrive (approximate date).
- 868 – Monastery founded by Ethelred.
- 876 – Danes occupy town.
- 893 – Town besieged by Danes again.
- 900 – Market active.
- 927 – Athelstan evicts the Cornish from Exeter (and perhaps the rest of Devon), according to William of Malmesbury, writing around 1120.
- 932 – Monastery founded by Athelstan.
- 1003 – Exeter sacked by forces of Sweyn of Denmark.
- 1048 – Episcopal see relocated to Exeter from Crediton.
- 1050 – Leofric becomes bishop of Exeter.
- 1067 – Exeter besieged by forces of William the Conqueror.
- 1068 – Rougemont Castle built (approximate date).
- 1087 – Benedictine Priory of St Nicholas founded.
- 1130 – Exeter fair active.
- 1136 – Exeter besieged by forces of Stephen, King of England.
- 1190 – Old Exe Bridge construction began.
- 1207 – Mayor in office.
- 1214 – Old Exe Bridge construction finished (approximate).
- 1236 – Nunnery founded.
- 1348 – Order of Brothelyngham, an anti-religious group, active in the city.
- 1400 – Exeter Cathedral built (approximate date).
- 1466 – Tailors' trade gild incorporated.
- 1468/70 – Exeter Guildhall current building constructed.
- 1482 – Tailors' trade gild dissolved on the petition of the burgesses.
- 1490 – Company of Weavers and Fullers incorporated.
- 1497 – City besieged by forces of Perkin Warbeck.

== 16th–18th centuries ==
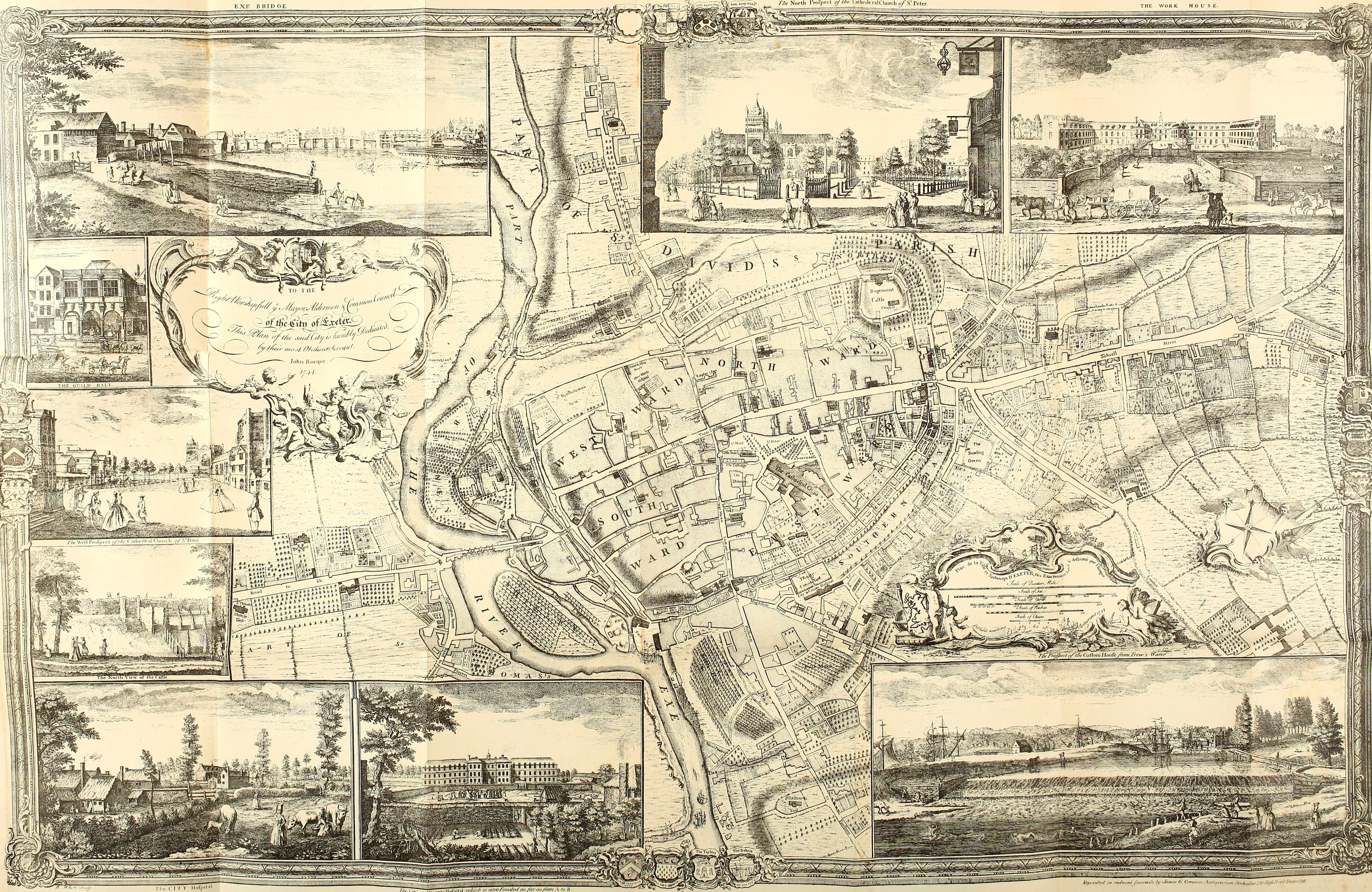
John Rocque's 1744 map of Exeter

- 1536
  - City becomes a county corporate.
  - Monastery disbanded.
- 1556 – Society of Merchant Adventurers incorporated.
- 1564 – Exeter Ship Canal construction begins.
- 1593 – Guildhall rebuilt.
- 1595 – Michael Harte bookseller in business.
- 1612 – Northernhay Gardens laid out.
- 1633 – Exeter Free Grammar School opens.
- 1643 – September: City taken by forces of Charles I of England.
- 1646 – April: Parliamentarians in power.
- 1664 – St Stephen's Church built.
- 1681 – Custom House built on the Quay.
- 1688 – November: William III of England visits city.
- 1696 – Mint established.
- 1714 – Exeter Mercury newspaper begins publication.
- 1743 – Royal Devon and Exeter Hospital opened.
- 1760 – George's Meeting (Unitarian) built.
- 1763 – Trewman's Exeter Flying Post newspaper in publication.
- 1764 – Exeter Synagogue consecrated.
- 1778 – Bridge rebuilt.
- 1783 – Gilbert Dyer's circulating library in business.
- 1792 – Exeter Gazette newspaper begins publication.

== 19th century ==
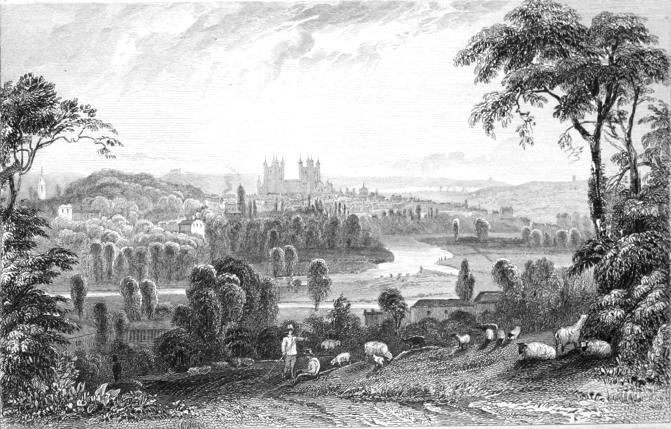
View of Exeter, 1803

- 1813
  - Devon and Exeter Institution founded.
  - Exeter Western Luminary begins publication.
- 1814
  - Iron Footbridge built.
  - Exeter Medical Library founded.
- 1821 – Besley's Exeter News begins publication.
- 1823 – Cholera epidemic.
- 1825
  - Mechanics' Institution opens.
  - Chichester Place laid out.
- 1832 – Veitch plant nursery in business.
- 1835 – Athenaeum instituted.
- 1837 – Catacombs built.
- 1840 – Exeter Diocesan Training College opens.
- 1842 – Church of St Andrew built.
- 1844 – Bristol and Exeter Railway begins operating to Exeter St Davids railway station.
- 1847 – Polytechnic Institution founded.
- 1848 – South Devon Railway begins operating from Exeter St Davids station.
- 1852 – Exeter and South Devon Volunteers formed.
- 1853 – Prison built.
- 1854 – School of Art founded.
- 1860 – London and South Western Railway begins operating to Exeter Queen Street station.
- 1862 – Devonshire Association for the Advancement of Science, Literature, and Art established.
- 1867 – November: Economic unrest.
- 1870 – Royal Albert Memorial Museum established.
- 1882 – Horse-drawn tram begins operating.
- 1884 – 18 November: Sacred Heart Church opened.
- 1887 – 5 September: Theatre Royal burns down with 186 fatalities.
- 1889
  - Theatre Royal rebuilt.
  - Devon and Exeter Medico-Chirurgical Society founded.
- 1896 – City of Exeter Electricity Company formed.

== 20th century ==
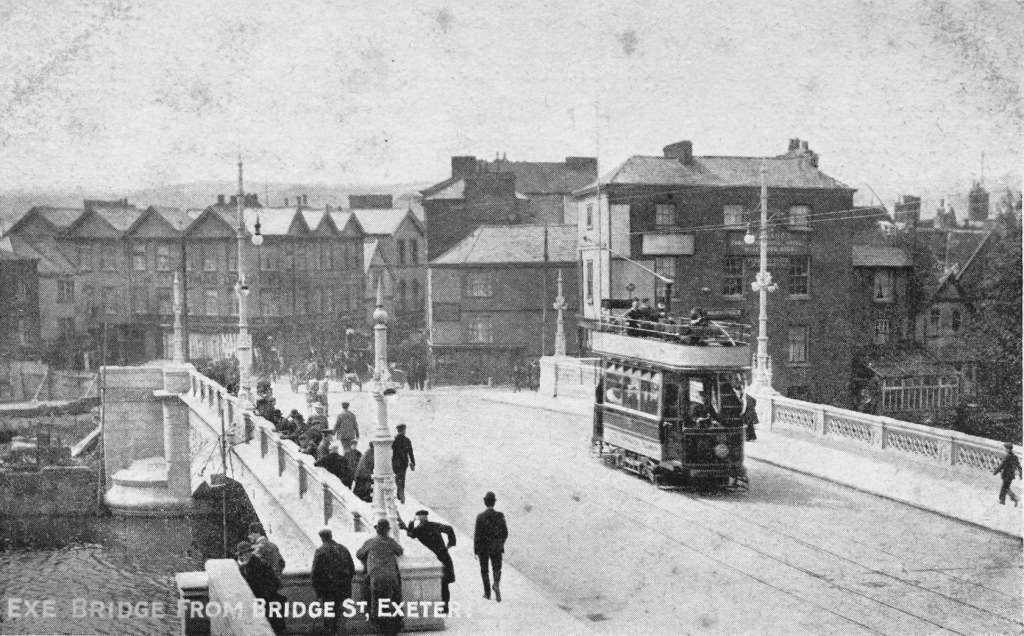
Electric tram crosses the new Exe Bridge, 1905

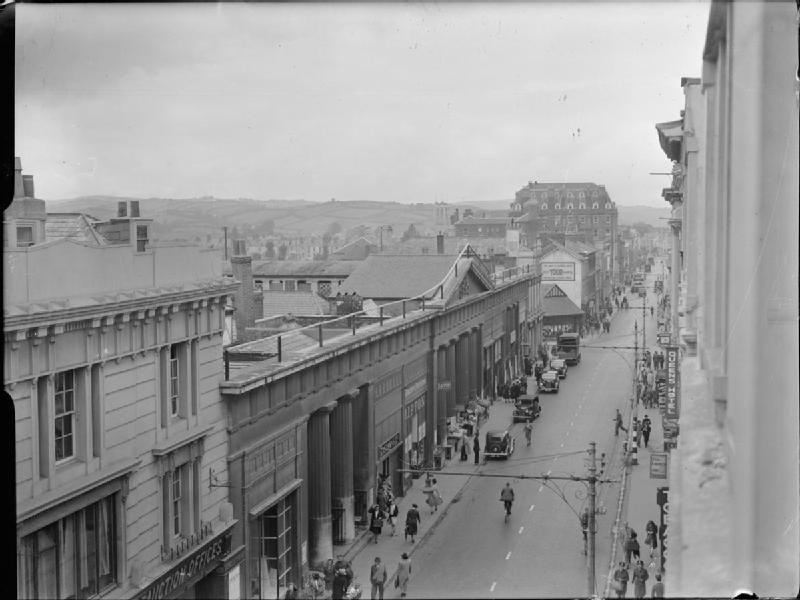
Queen Street, Exeter, 1943

- 1901 – Population: 47,185.
- 1904 – Express & Echo newspaper begins publication.
- 1905
  - 29 March: Rebuilt Exe Bridge opened.
  - 4 April: Exeter Corporation Tramways begins operating its electric system.
  - Approximate date: Devon and Cornwall Record Society established.
- 1907 – Sidwell Street Methodist Church completed, a pioneering example of reinforced concrete construction by French engineer Paul Cottancin.
- 1910 – Empire Electric Palace opens.
- 1911 – Exeter Pictorial Record Society active.
- 1914 – 7 October: First of five war emergency hospitals in requisitioned buildings in the city opens to casualties, staffed by Voluntary Aid Detachment nurses.
- 1916 – December: Deller's Café opens in Bedford Street.
- 1937
  - Odeon Exeter cinema opens.
  - Exeter Airport opens.
- 1942 – May: "Baedeker Blitz": Aerial bombing by the German Luftwaffe devastates the city centre.
- 1949 – 21 October: Official inauguration of construction of Princesshay, Britain's first pedestrianised shopping precinct, as part of the postwar city centre reconstruction.
- 1955 – University of Exeter chartered.
- 1960 – October: Flood.
- 1963 – November: Exeter & Devon Crematorium opened.
- 1964 – Devon County Hall built.
- 1966 – 1 April: City boundaries extended to include Alphington, Pinhoe and Topsham.
- 1967 – Northcott Theatre opens.
- 1970 – Exeter College established.
- 1972 – Barnfield Theatre established.
- 1974 – Spacex (art gallery) established.
- 1977 – M5 motorway opens.
- 1997 – Douglas Centre for the History of Cinema and Popular Culture opens at University of Exeter.

== 21st century ==
- 2007 – Princesshay rebuilt.
- 2008 – 22 May: Attempted bombing in Princesshay.
- 2011 – Population: 117,773.
- 2017 – Exeter Chiefs rugby union team win the Aviva Premiership.
- 2021 – World War II bomb detonation.

== See also ==
- Exeter history
- Timelines of other cities in South West England: Bath, Bristol, Plymouth

== Bibliography ==
=== Published in 17th–18th centuries ===
- John Ogilby (1699), "(Exeter)", Traveller's Guide, or, A Most Exact Description of the Roads of England, London: Abel Swall
- Richard Izacke; Samuel Izacke (1724) [1677], Remarkable Antiquities of the City of Exeter, London: Printed for Edw. Score
- Antient History and Description of the City of Exeter. Exeter: Andrews and Trewman. 1765. "Compiled and digested from the works of Hooker, Izacke, and Others"
- Daniel Defoe; Samuel Richardson (1778), "Devonshire: (Exeter)", A Tour Through the Island of Great Britain (8th ed.), London: J.F. and C. Rivingdon

=== Published in 19th century ===
==== 1800s–1840s ====
- John Britton; Edward Wedlake Brayley (1803), "Exeter", Beauties of England and Wales, vol. 4, London: Vernor & Hood
- Alexander Jenkins (1806), The history and description of the city of Exeter, Exeter: P. Hedgeland, OCLC 5828563, OL 6929249M
- S. Woolmer (1811), A Concise Account of the City of Exeter (2nd ed.), Exeter
- George Alexander Cooke (c. 1822). "Exeter". Topographical and Statistical Description of the County of Devon (3rd ed.). London: Sherwood, Neeley and Jones.
- James Dugdale (1819), "Devonshire: Exeter", New British Traveller, vol. 2, London: J. Robins and Co.
- "Exeter". Rees's Cyclopædia. 1819.
- New Guide to the City of Exeter. Exeter: W. Spreat. 1824.
- Robert Watt (1824). "Exeter". Bibliotheca Britannica. Vol. 3. Edinburgh: A. Constable. hdl:2027/nyp.33433089888832. OCLC 961753.
- Exeter itinerary and general directory, Exeter: T. and H. Besley, 1828
- David Brewster, ed. (1830). "Exeter". Edinburgh Encyclopædia. Edinburgh: William Blackwood.
- "Exeter", Great Western, Cheltenham and Great Western, and Bristol and Exeter Railway Guides, London: James Wyld, 1839, OCLC 12922212
- Samuel Lewis (1848), "Exeter", Topographical Dictionary of England (7th ed.), London: S. Lewis and Co.

==== 1850s–1890s ====
- "Hand Book of Exeter", Besley's Hand Book for the Archery Meeting, and Visitor's Guide to Exeter, Exeter: Henry Besley, 1858, hdl:2027/njp.32101064794991, "Grand National Archery Meeting"
- George Samuel Measom (1860), "Exeter", Official Illustrated Guide to the Bristol and Exeter, North and South Devon, Cornwall, and South Wales Railways, London: Richard Griffin and Co., hdl:2027/wu.89097040505
- George Oliver (1861), The history of the city of Exeter, Exeter: W. Roberts, OL 7051533M
- Charles Knight, ed. (1867). "Exeter". Geography. English Cyclopaedia. London: Bradbury, Evans, & Co. hdl:2027/nyp.33433000064794.
- Hand-book and directory for Exeter and its neighbourhood. Exeter: H. Mortimer. c. 1874.
- W. Cotton; Henry Woollcombe (1877), Gleanings from the Municipal and Cathedral Records Relative to the History of the City of Exeter, J. Townsend
- History, gazetteer and directory of the County of Devon including the City of Exeter (2nd ed.), Sheffield: William White, 1878, OL 14012345M
- Illustrated Hand Book of Exeter, Exeter: H. Besley and Son, 1880, OCLC 12990441, OL 22883206M
- John Parker Anderson (1881), "Devonshire: Exeter", Book of British Topography: a Classified Catalogue of the Topographical Works in the Library of the British Museum Relating to Great Britain and Ireland, London: W. Satchell
- R.N. Worth (1883), "Exeter", Tourist's Guide to South Devon (3rd ed.), London: Edward Stanford
- Popular Illustrated Guide to Exeter and Its Neighbourhood. Exeter: Thomas Upward. 1887.
- Edward Augustus Freeman (1890), Exeter, Historic Towns (2nd ed.), London: Longmans, Green, and Co., OCLC 3601841, OL 6586115M
- Herbert Edward Reynolds (1895), A short history of the ancient diocese of Exeter, Exeter: H. Besley, OL 7241003M
- "Exeter", Great Britain (4th ed.), Leipsic: Karl Baedeker, 1897, hdl:2027/mdp.39015010546516, OCLC 6430424
- Charles Gross (1897). "Exeter". Bibliography of British Municipal History. New York: Longmans, Green, and Co.
- Charles Slegg Ward (1897), "Exeter", North Devon and North Cornwall, Thorough Guides (7th ed.), Dulau & Co.
- Guide to Exeter. London: Ward, Lock & Co. 1899.
- "Exeter", Route Book of Devon (2nd ed.), Exeter: Henry Besley, 1900
- "Central Section: Exeter". Book of Fair Devon. United Devon Association. 1900.

=== Published in 20th century ===
- A.R. Hope Moncrieff, ed. (1902), Black's Guide to Exeter and East Devon, London: A. & C. Black
- G.K. Fortescue, ed. (1902). "Exeter". Subject Index of the Modern Works Added to the Library of the British Museum in the Years 1881–1900. London: The Trustees. hdl:2027/uc1.b5107011.
- J.G. Bartholomew (1904), "Exeter", Survey Gazetteer of the British Isles, London: G. Newnes
- A.M. Shorto (1906). Story of Exeter: for use in schools. Exeter: James G. Commin.
- "Exeter". List of Works Relating to British Genealogy and Local History. New York: New York Public Library. 1910.
- "Exeter (England)" . Encyclopædia Britannica. Vol. 10 (11th ed.). 1910. pp. 65–66.
- Report on the records of the City of Exeter, London: HM Stationery Office, 1916, OCLC 924383, OL 7065949M
- "Exeter". England. Blue Guides. London: Macmillan. 1920.
- W. G. Hoskins. Industry, Trade and People in Exeter, 1688–1800 (1935)
- W. Stanley Lewis and A. H. Shorter (1939). "The Evolution of Exeter". Geography. 24 (3): 149–161. JSTOR 40561002.
- W. G. Hoskins. "Exeter" History Today (May 1951), Vol. 1 Issue 5, p28-37 online.
- Aileen Fox. Roman Exeter (1952)
- Connie S. Evans (2000). "'An Echo of the Multitude': The Intersection of Governmental and Private Poverty Initiatives in Early Modern Exeter". Albion: A Quarterly Journal Concerned with British Studies. 32 (3): 408–428. doi:10.2307/4053912. JSTOR 4053912.

=== Published in 21st century ===
- "Exeter". Brewer's Britain and Ireland. Weidenfeld & Nicolson. 2005. ISBN 1-84972-185-8 – via Credo Reference.(subscription required)
- Tim Isaac and Chris Hallam Secret Exeter (2018)
