= Nail bomb =

Anti-personnel explosive device

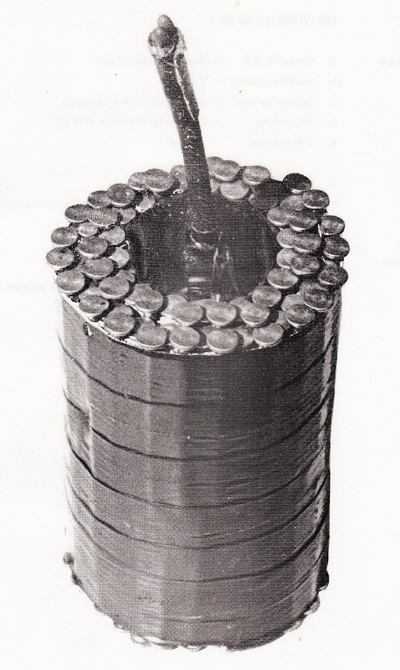
Typical design of a nail bomb (I.E.D.)

A nail bomb is an anti-personnel improvised explosive device containing nails to increase its effectiveness at harming victims. The nails act as shrapnel, leading almost certainly to more injury in inhabited areas than the explosives alone would. A nail bomb is also a type of flechette weapon. Such weapons use bits of shrapnel (steel balls, nail heads, screws, needles, broken razors, darts and other small metal objects) to create a larger radius of destruction.

Nail bombs are often used by terrorists, including suicide bombers, since they cause larger numbers of casualties when detonated in crowded places. Nail bombs can be detected by electromagnetic sensors and standard metal detectors.

== Nail-bomb incidents ==
=== Pre-2000s ===
- On 6 March 1970, in the Greenwich Village townhouse explosion, three members of the Weather Underground were killed in the accidental explosion of a nail bomb intended to be set off at a non-commissioned officers dance at the Fort Dix, New Jersey Army base.
- Several nail bombings occurred during The Troubles in Northern Ireland, both by Republicans and Loyalists.
- American Mafia figure Philip Testa was killed by a nail bomb in Philadelphia in 1981.
- Mark Hofmann, convicted of murdering two people with a nail bomb in 1985.
- In 1989, football hooligans threw nail bombs at supporters of a rival club in the Netherlands.
- A number of nail-bombings occurred in 1999 when the neo-Nazi David Copeland planted several devices in London targeted against ethnic minorities and LGBT people.

=== 2000s ===
- On 11 October 2002 in Myyrmäki, Finland, a 19-year-old named Petri Gerdt committed a nail bombing in a local mall. Seven people died including Gerdt, and 159 were injured.
- On 9 June 2004, a nail bomb was detonated in Cologne, Germany, by the Nazi terrorist group National Socialist Underground (Nationalsozialistischer Untergrund) in a popular Turkish shopping quarter called "Little Istanbul", wounding 22 people and damaging several shops and parked cars. According to the magazine Der Spiegel, the Nazi group claimed responsibility for the attack in a DVD found in the ruins of a house in Zwickau (D) that exploded on 4 November 2011.
- On 31 December 2005, an Indonesian marketplace was nail-bombed, and a second undetonated bomb was found nearby.
- On 29 June 2007, a nail bomb that was assumed to be a part of a terror plot was discovered in a car and was consequently defused by police in the West End of London. There was a second car bomb, further down the street that was apparently scheduled to detonate as evacuees and survivors fled down the street, to a nearby tube station (Presumably Charing Cross or Embankment station).
- On 21 December 2007, a nail bomb was detonated in Sherpao, Pakistan by a suicide bomber. Detonation occurred inside a tightly packed mosque, filled with holiday worshippers. At least 50 people were killed, with over 100 injured.
- In the 22 May 2008 Exeter bombing, a nail bomb explosive was detonated in the toilets of Giraffe café in the Princesshay Shopping Centre in Exeter, Devon. The homemade bomb exploded in the attacker's face as he was trying to arm it in the café toilet. Police then found another nail bomb inside the café after everybody had been evacuated.

=== 2010s ===
- On 11 April 2011, a nail bomb was detonated in the Minsk Metro, Belarus. 15 people were killed and 204 people were injured.
- During the 2011 Syrian uprising, security forces were reported to have used nail bombs against crowds of protesters.
- On 15 April 2013, pressure cooker bombs filled with bits of metal, nails, and ball bearings were used in the Boston Marathon bombing.
- On 22 March 2016, nail bombs were used by ISIL during the terrorist attacks on Brussels Airport, Zaventem and the metro station in Maalbeek.
- On 24 September 2016, a nail bomb was detonated in Budapest, Hungary. Two policemen and a taxi driver were injured in the attack.
- On 22 May 2017, a nail-bomb attack occurred at the Manchester Arena where American singer Ariana Grande was performing. The total number of people killed was 22 and 1,017 were injured. Among the 22 dead were children, including one who was 8 years old.
- On 23 August 2017 41-year-old Sergei Barakhov stabbed three people to death at his workplace at a Gorky Automobile Plant and wounded two more, then threw a nail bomb at policemen trying to detain him. The bomb caused no casualties.
- On 17 October 2018, Vladislav Roslyakov killed 20 people using a nail bomb and a pump-action shotgun during an attack on Kerch Polytechnic College.

== Use by special forces ==
Although nail bombs are primarily used by violent non-state actors, these improvised explosive devices are also included in the arsenals of some state special forces. For example, instructions on the production of such devices remained in manuals intended for the United States Army Special Forces at least until the 1960s.

== See also ==
- Explosive belt
- Improvised explosive device
- Molotov cocktail
- Pipe bomb
- Ted Kaczynski
