= History of Plymouth =

History of the city in Devon, England

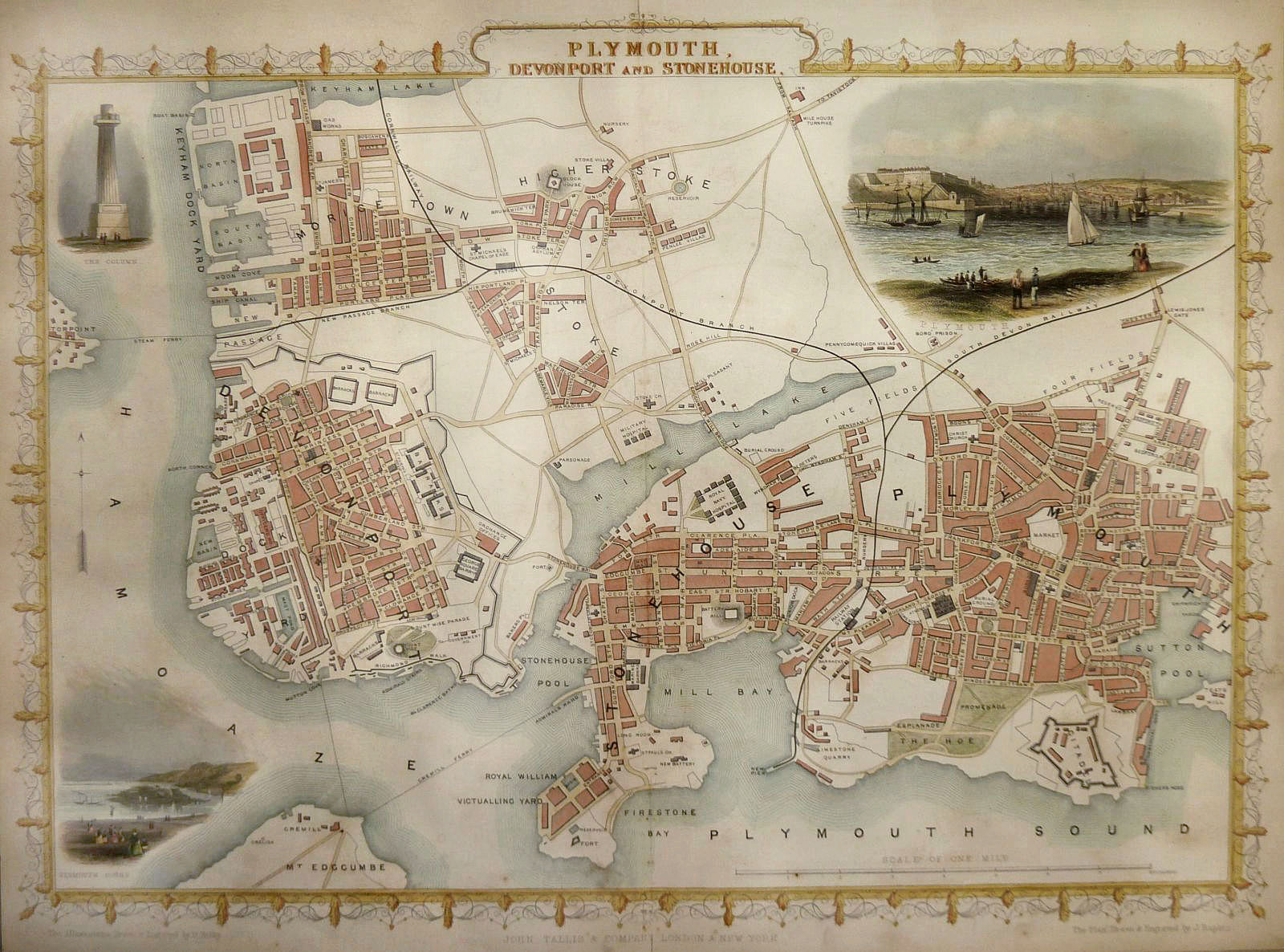
Map of c.1854 showing the Three Towns: Devonport with its defences to the left, Stonehouse in the centre, Plymouth to the right

The History of Plymouth in Devon, England, extends back to the Bronze Age, when the first settlement began at Mount Batten a peninsula in Plymouth Sound facing onto the English Channel. It continued as both a fishing and continental tin trading port through the late Iron Age into the Early Medieval period, until the more prosperous Saxon settlement of Sutton, later renamed Plymouth, surpassed it. With its natural harbour and open access to the Atlantic, the town found wealth and a national strategic importance during the establishment of British naval dominance in the colonisation of the New World. In 1620 the Pilgrim Fathers departed from Plymouth to establish the second English colony in America. During the English Civil War the town was besieged between 1642 and 1646 by the Royalists, but after the Restoration a Dockyard was established in the nearby town of Devonport (later amalgamated with Plymouth). Throughout the Industrial Revolution Plymouth grew as a major mercantile shipping industry, including imports and passengers from the US, whilst Devonport grew as a naval base and ship construction town, building battleships for the Royal Navy – which later led to its partial destruction during World War II in a series of air-raids known as the Plymouth Blitz. After the war was over, the city centre was completely rebuilt to a new plan.

== Toponymy ==
For much of its earlier history, the settlement here was known as Sutton (Sutona in 1086, Suttona in 1201), simply meaning South town. It was based near Sutton Harbour, the oldest quarter of the modern city. The modern name has two parts: Plym and mouth. The element Plym is taken from the River Plym along which Sutton traded with its parent settlement of Plympton, but Plympton's name (first recorded as Plymentun in c. 900) is considered to derive from the Old English word for 'plum tree', though the local civic association suggests an alternative derivation from the Celtic Pen-lyn-don ("fort at the head of a creek").

By the early 13th century, the river was being called the Plym (Plyme, in 1238), as a back-formation from Plympton and Plymstock (first recorded as Plemestocha in 1086). The earliest records of the name Plymouth date from around this time (as Plymmue in 1230, Plimmuth in 1234).

Plymouth notably lent its name to the settlement of Plymouth, Massachusetts apocryphally following the departure of the Pilgrim Fathers aboard the Mayflower in 1620 but primarily for the many other settlements in North America resulting from the activity of The Plymouth Company which had executive authority for colonising the east coast of America between latitudes 38° and 45° N from 1606 to 1624.

== Early history ==
The earliest human remains in the Plymouth area are from a number of caves around Plymouth Sound. The 'bone caves', located at Cattedown, Oreston, Turnchapel and Stonehouse, contain extensive Upper Palaeolithic deposits, including those of Homo sapiens, some of the earliest such evidence in England. A reindeer bone from one of the Cattedown caves is dated 15,125 ± 390 years B.P. There is no public access to the caves, and they are not easily locatable or visitable. However, their archaeological importance is very great, owing to both the geographical location of the Cattedown discovery, in a European context, and to the quantitative and qualitative nature and physical disposition of the human remains; this is one of the most important discoveries for the early history of anatomically modern humans in Europe. There is currently no evidence of Homo neanderthalensis having been found in caves at Cattedown, Oreston, Stonehouse or Mount Batten (Turnchapel).

It was once thought, based on a reference to TAMARIS OSTIA ('Port of Tamar') in Ptolemy's Geographia, that tin brought from Dartmoor via the River Plym was traded with the Phoenicians here, but this theory was discounted by Malcolm Todd in 1987. However, evidence of copper ingots and copper scrap in contexts dating from the late Bronze Age to the Middle Iron Age have been found at Mount Batten, a promontory settlement jutting into Plymouth Sound, which was one of the main ports of trade in Prehistoric Britain.

Tin trading at Mount Batten in the region inhabited by the Dumnonii continued up to the period of Roman Britain (approximately 50 AD), but it had declined since the Iron Age. As a peripheral trading outpost of the Roman Empire this port continued to trade tin along with cattle and hides but was eclipsed by the rise of the fishing village of Sutton opposite. Later evidence suggests that the Brythonic kingdom of Dumnonia retained a degree of autonomy from Rome, and the later Anglo-Saxon kingdom of Wessex due to the significance of its tin mining activities. Archaeological evidence from the surrounding region of west Devon and east Cornwall suggests that the area was culturally distinct from the more easterly English heartlands well into the Middle Ages, the agricultural and architectural patterns having much more in common with Atlantic South Wales, Ireland and Brittany.

At the time of the Domesday Book (1086) the manor of Sutton was held by the King, but Henry I granted it to the Valletort family of nearby Trematon Castle. The Valletorts in turn granted parts to the Augustinian priory at Plympton, a larger and older settlement than Plymouth, at the head of the tidal estuary of the River Plym. That part of the town owned by Plympton Priory was granted a market charter in 1254, and the whole town and its surrounding area achieved municipal independence in 1439, becoming the first town to be incorporated by act of parliament.

As the higher parts of the Plym estuary silted up, ships used the Cattewater moorings and the then tidal harbour at the Plym's mouth instead of Plympton. And so the name of the town Sutton slowly became Plymouth. The name Sutton still exists in the name of its old harbour and a parliamentary division.

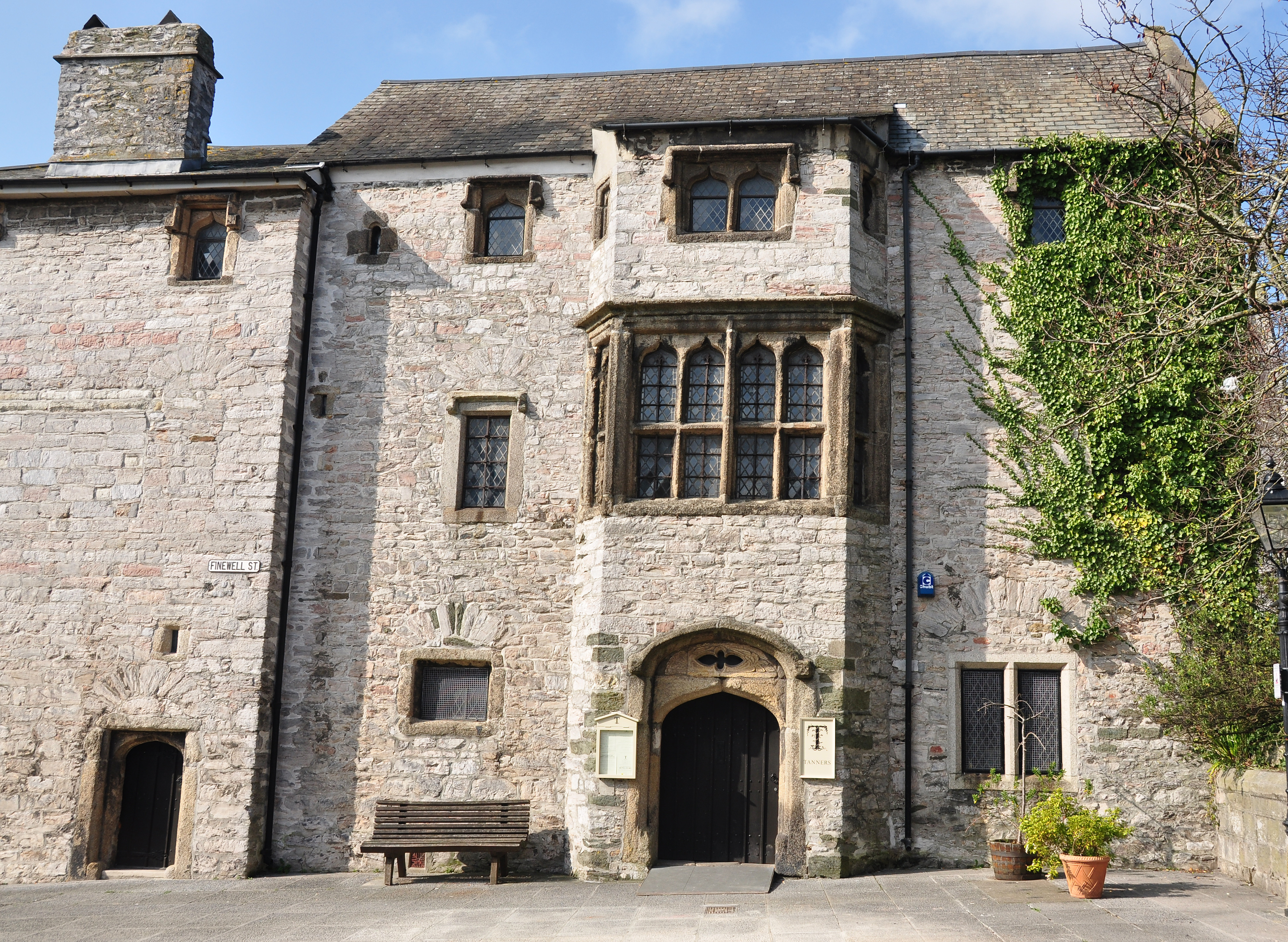
Prysten House (1498) on Finewell Street is the oldest surviving house in Plymouth, built from local Plymouth limestone and Dartmoor granite.

The town was often the target of enemies across the English Channel, especially during the Hundred Years' War. In 1340 French attackers, who had been successfully burning towns along the coast by surprise, burned a manor house and took some prisoners, but failed to get into the town; by the time they reached Plymouth, they had lost the advantage of surprise. In 1403, the town was briefly occupied and burnt by Breton raiders.

In the late fifteenth century Plymouth Castle, a "castle quadrate", was constructed close to the area now known as The Barbican; it included four round towers, one at each corner, as featured on the city coat of arms. The castle served to protect Sutton Pool, which is where the fleet was based in Plymouth prior to the establishment of Plymouth Dock. In 1512 an Act of Parliament was passed for further fortifying Plymouth, and a series of fortifications were then built including defensive walls at the entrance to Sutton Pool (across which a chain would be extended in time of danger). Defences on St Nicholas Island also date from this time, and a string of six artillery blockhouses were built (including one on Fishers Nose at the south-eastern corner of the Hoe). This location was further strengthened by the building of a fort (later known as Drake's Fort) in 1596, which itself went on to provide the site for the Citadel, established in the 1660s.

== Renaissance age ==
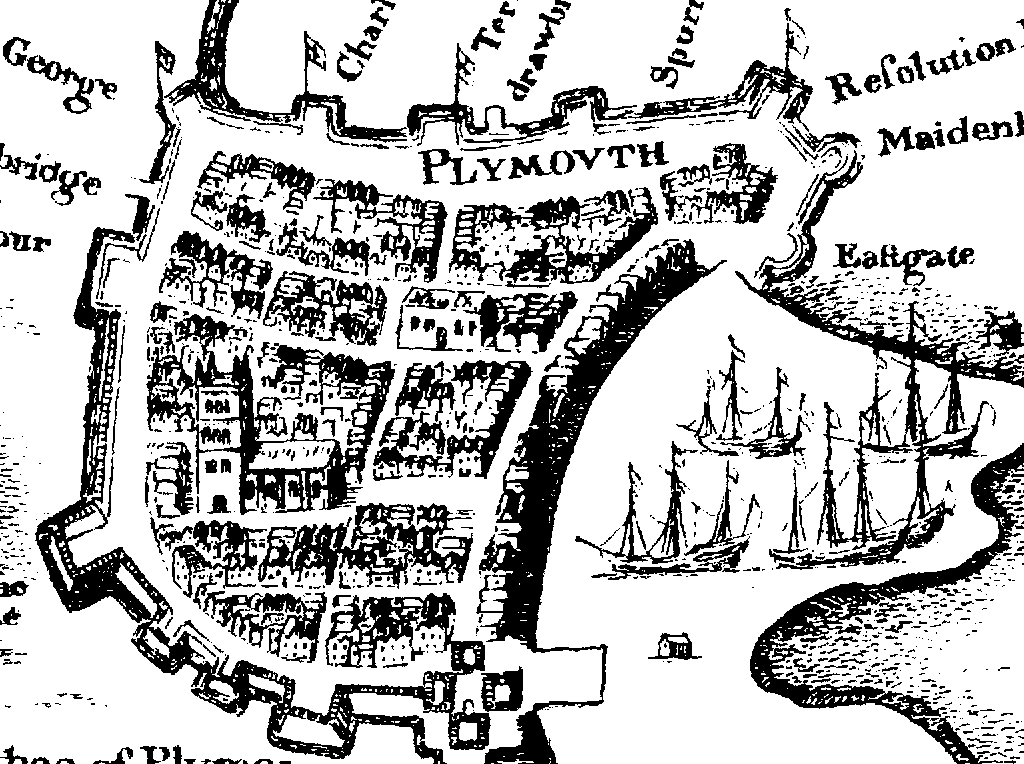
A sketch of Plymouth, c. 1600

During the 16th century, Plymouth was the home port for a number of successful maritime traders, among them William Hawkins, who made the first English expeditions to West Africa in the 1530s; and his son Sir John Hawkins, who led England's first foray into the slave trade.

The diary of his own son Admiral Sir Richard Hawkins inspired the Victorian novel Westward Ho! which romantically mythologises the historical exploits of the 'Men of Devon' of this era.

However Sir Francis Drake, navigator, privateer and vice admiral of the British Royal Navy remains the city's most famous resident; though born in Tavistock, he was mayor of Plymouth from 1581 and is credited with bringing fresh water from Dartmoor to the flourishing town by means of an aqueduct now known as Drake's Leat and developing the Tudor fortifications around Sutton Harbour. The remains of once wealthy Elizabethan Merchant's houses can be still be seen in the city's Barbican quarter – which has also seen the first arrival and departure on British soil of many notable persons such as Catherine of Aragon and Pocahontas in 1501 and 1616 respectively.

Outside the historic town walls, Plymouth Hoe, meaning high place, remains a wide grass meadow atop cliffs overlooking the natural harbour of Plymouth Sound. According to an enduring national myth, this is the place where Sir Francis Drake insisted on completing his game of bowls to allow wind and tide to change in his favour enabling his defeat of the Spanish Armada in 1588.

In 1589, the English Armada's assembly had been completed, and the fleet of 146 ships lay at mooring in Plymouth. However, due to poor planning, and a lack of both cavalry and siege artillery aboard the fleet, the expedition was ultimately defeated.

Local histographer Sir Richard Carew of Antony in his Survey of Cornwall noted the presence in the early 17th century of large outline images of the giants Gog and Magog (or Goemagot and Corineus the mythical founder of Cornwall) which had been for a long time cut into the grass of the Hoe, exposing the white limestone beneath. There is no trace of these chalk figures today.

In 1606 the Plymouth Company (the Plymouth Adventurers) was issued with a royal charter by James I of England with the purpose of establishing settlements on the coast of North America. A few years later, Plymouth was also the departure point of the Mayflower in 1620, aboard which the Pilgrim Fathers set sail for the New World, establishing the second permanent English colony in the United States of America. They eventually landed at a site which Captain John Smith had already named New Plymouth in a map published in his 1616 work A Description of New England and the Pilgrims accepted this name. Twin flags of the US and UK now fly at the Mayflower Steps to commemorate the significance of this event to both nations.

== Civil War, Restoration and William III ==
Truly, my lords, if this town be lost all the West will be in danger to follow it.

— Admiral Warwick, Plymouth, August 1644

During the English Civil War Plymouth, in common with the other major port towns, sided with the Parliamentarians and so was isolated from the surrounding regions of Devon and Cornwall which were held by Royalist sympathisers. The town was besieged almost continuously from December 1642 to January 1646; the main factor in its successful resistance was the navy's adherence to Parliament which allowed the regular arrival of supply ships and, when under serious Royalist attacks, enabled parties of seamen to be rushed ashore to reinforce the defences.

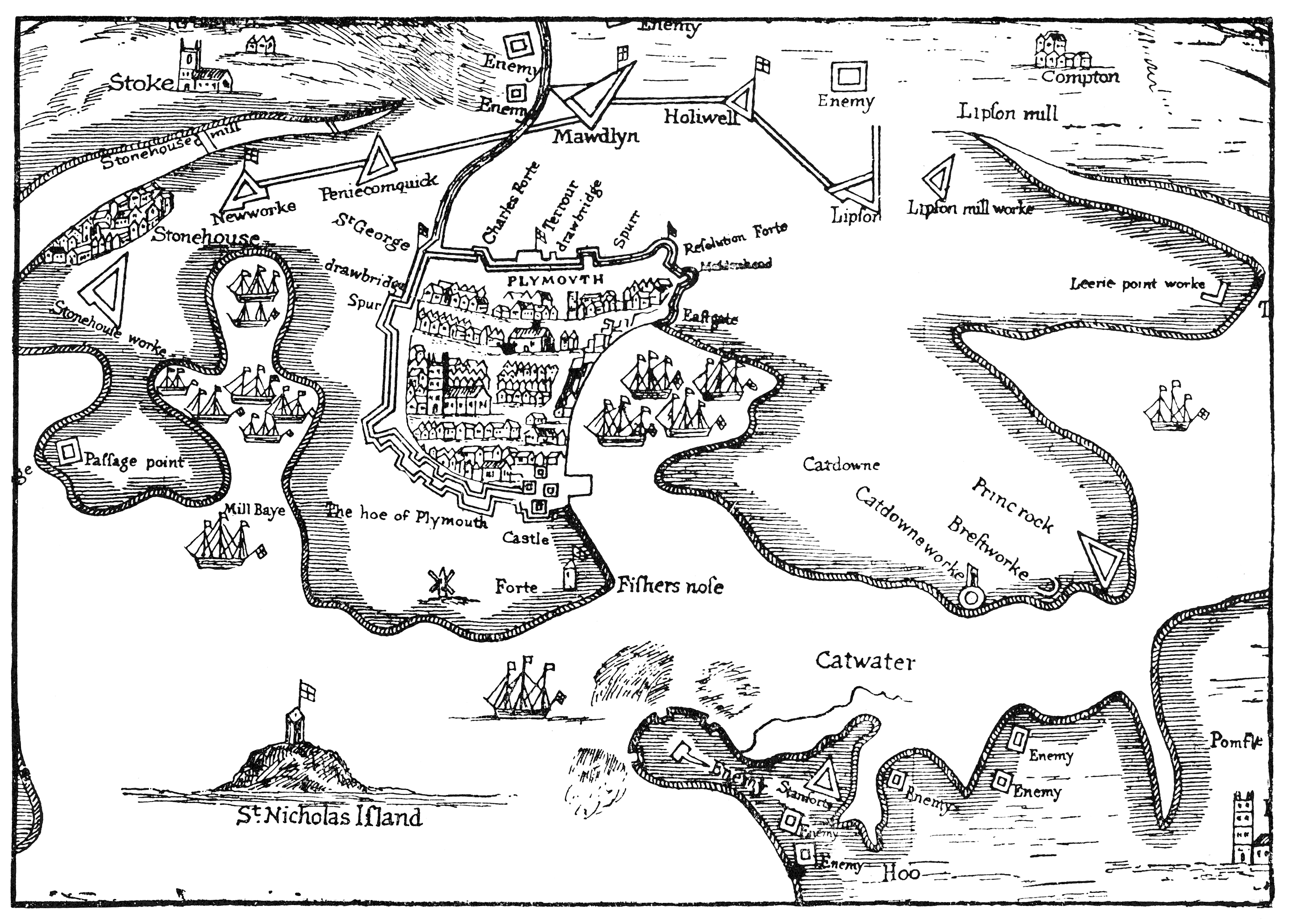
Part of a contemporary map showing the defences

Extensive works were constructed to defend the town, including a line of stockaded earthworks on high ground north of the town, from Lipson in the east to Eldad in the west, as well as several isolated works, for instance at Prince Rock, Cattedown and Stonehouse. Various skirmishes and confrontations occurred, including the rout of Royalist cavalry along Lipson Ridge on 3 December 1643, which is commemorated by a monument in Freedom Fields Park, and the battle of St Budeaux. Construction of the Royal Citadel began in 1665, after the Restoration; it was armed with cannon facing both out to sea and into the town, rumoured to be a reminder to residents not to oppose the Crown.

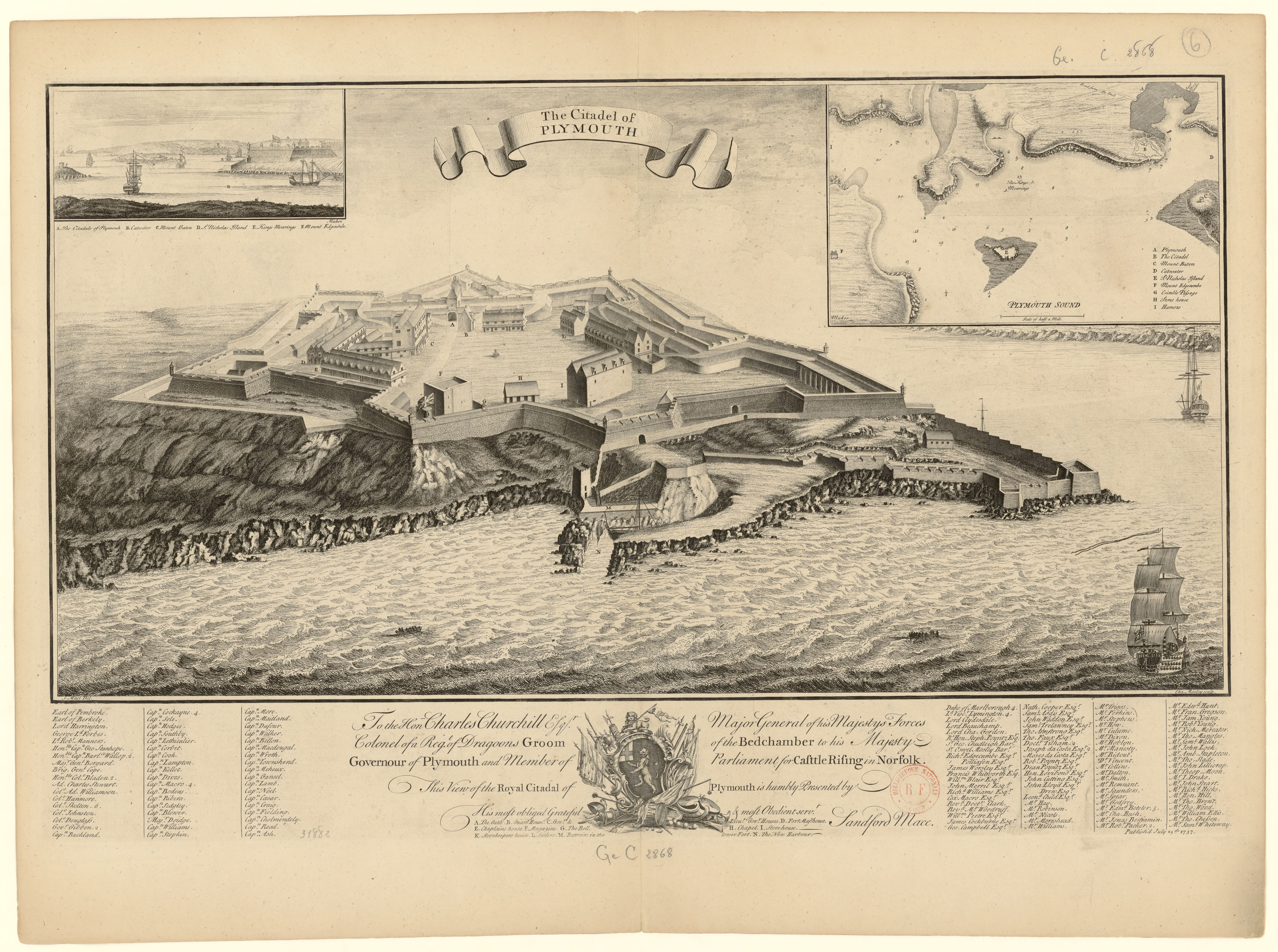
The Citadel in 1737

In the nearby parish of Stoke Damerel new dockyards at the mouth of the Tamar were commissioned by William of Orange in 1691 to support the Royal Navy in the western approaches. The settlement that developed here was called "Dock" or "Plymouth Dock" at the time, and a new town, separate from Plymouth, grew up. In 1712 there were 318 men employed and by 1733 it had grown to a population of 3,000 people. From then on, Plymouth became steadily more dependent on the Navy, and the thriving commercial port which had existed in the 17th century dwindled, as the activities of the press gang made it less attractive to merchant shipping.

The first Eddystone Lighthouse was erected by Henry Winstanley in 1696 in an attempt to protect the increasing volume of shipping passing the treacherous reefs on the approach to Rame Head.

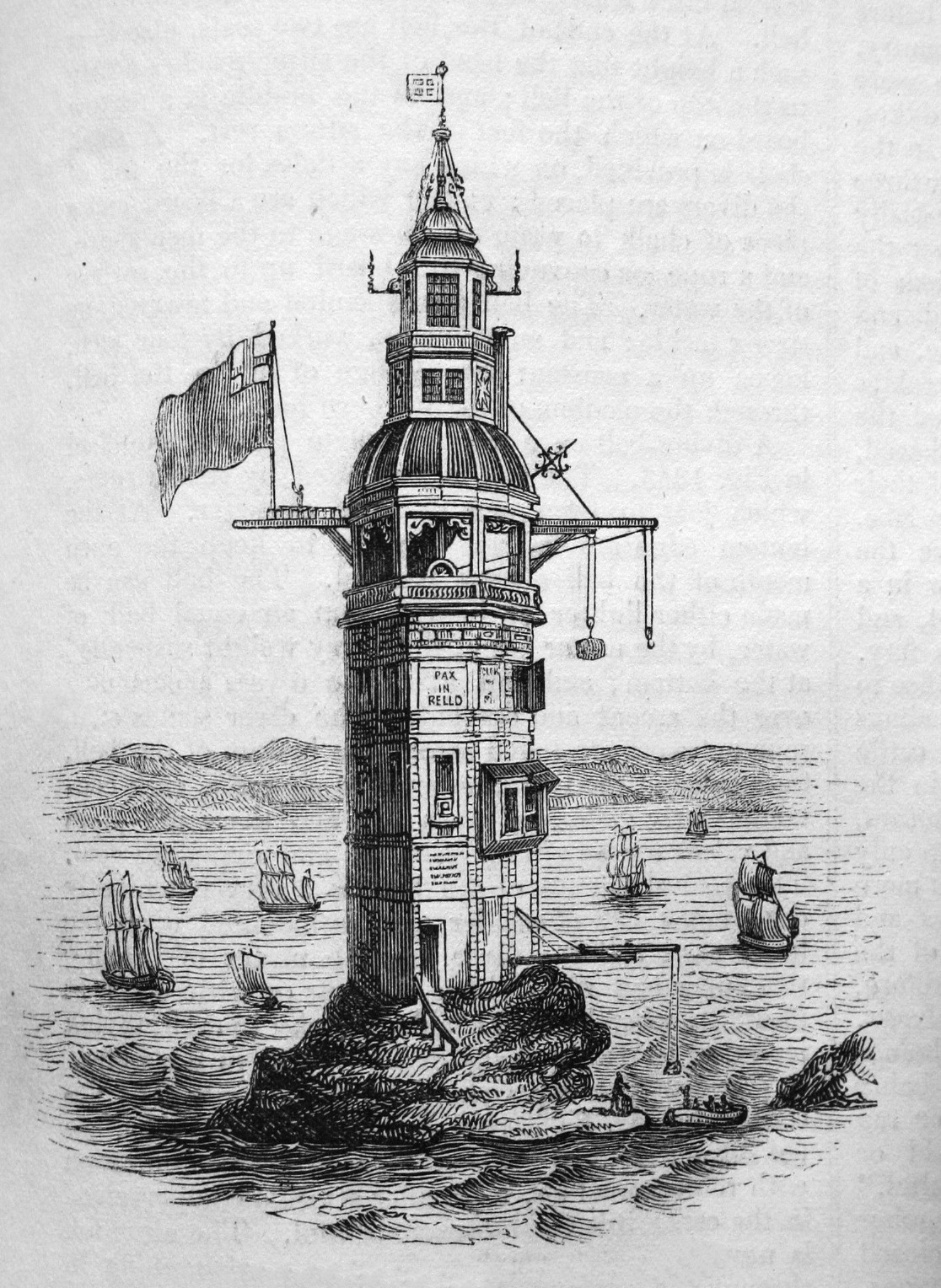
The first Eddystone Lighthouse 1699

== Napoleonic era ==
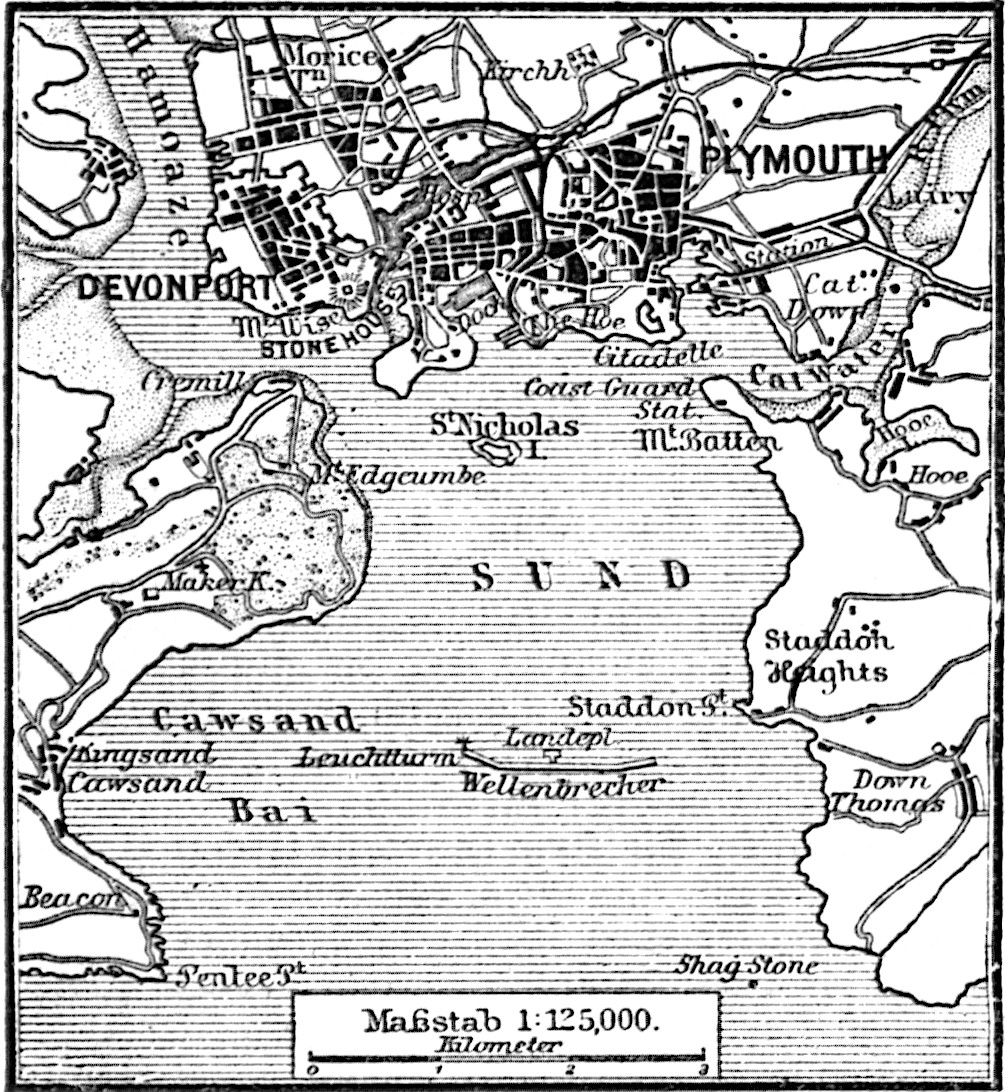
A map of Plymouth in 1890.

The 18th century marked a period of continued expansion and development for the ancient port town: the first theatre in Plymouth was built 1762, followed by the town's first bank in 1772. Similar growth took place in the two neighbouring towns of Stonehouse and Devonport (Plymouth-Dock). At Stonehouse was built the Royal Marine Barracks, 1782, and the Royal Naval Hospital built 1762;. At Devonport additional docks were built in 1727, 1762 and 1793; the first ferry to Torpoint began operating in 1791; and the Military Hospital was built in 1797 opposite the parish church.

The urban populations of Plymouth, Devonport and Stonehouse traded a variety of mineral ores such as copper, lime, tin and arsenic from the rural hinterlands via mining ports such as Morwellham Quay, Oreston the Stannary Towns of Tavistock and Plympton and small industrial towns throughout South Devon & East Cornwall. Around 1745, local apothecary William Cookworthy unravelled the then unknown formula for Chinese porcelain and developed the earliest English porcelain ware, Plymouth China manufactured for just two years in the town, but establishing the China Clay extraction industry in the region.

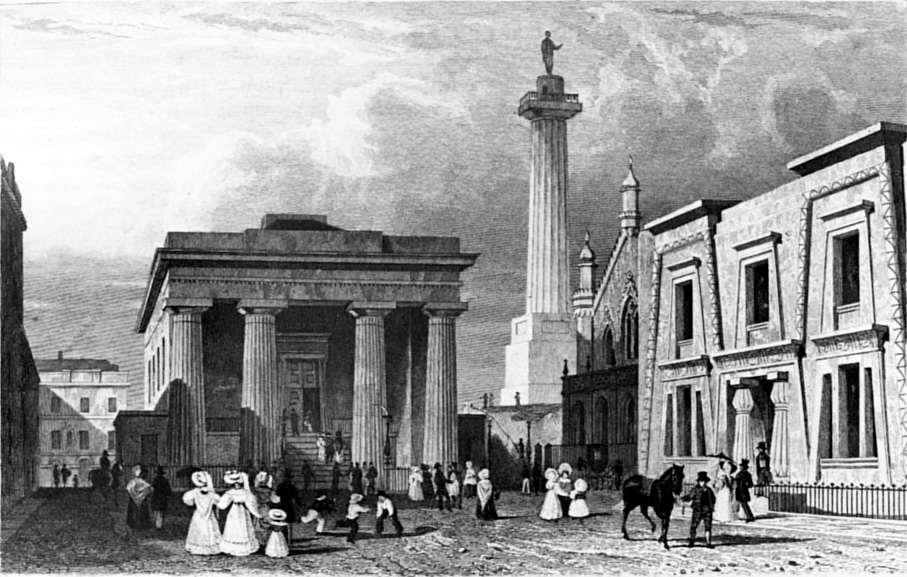
John Foulston's Town Hall, Column and Library in Devonport.

The Three Towns now enjoyed some prosperity during the late 18th and early 19th centuries and were enriched by a series of neo-classical urban developments designed by London architect John Foulston. Foulston was an important and early advocate of the Greek Revival and was responsible for several grand public buildings, many now destroyed, including the Athenaeum, the Theatre Royal and Royal Hotel, and he was responsible for the implementation of Union Street a grand thoroughfare proposed to unite the Three Towns. Important local houses such as Saltram House seat of the Earls of Morley, Antony House, Mount Edgcumbe House and Trematon Castle were extensively rebuilt to the fashionable Georgian tastes of the day by notable architects including Robert Adam.

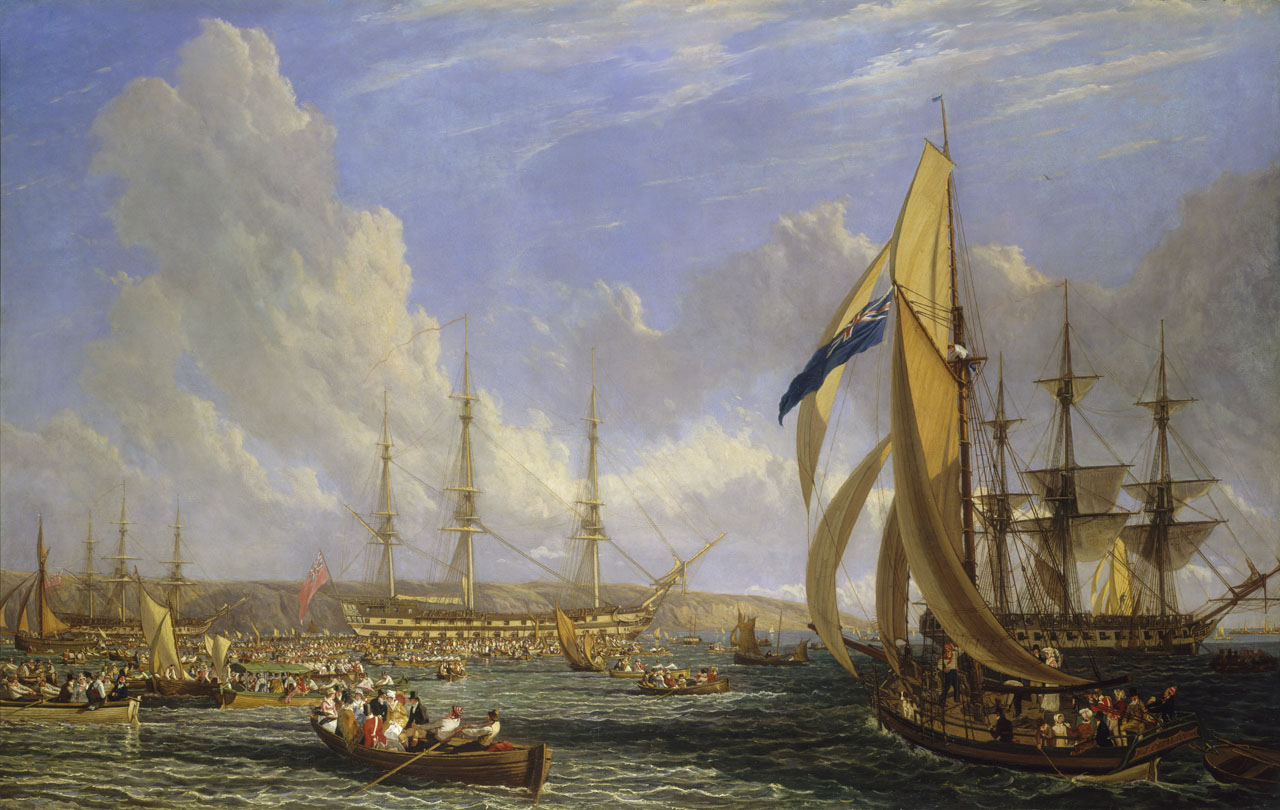
HMS Bellerophon anchored in Plymouth Sound, with Napoleon Bonaparte aboard. Bonaparte had surrendered to Captain Frederick Lewis Maitland of the Bellerophon and been transported to England.

After his defeat at the Battle of Waterloo in 1815, Napoleon Bonaparte was brought to Plymouth aboard HMS Bellerophon which remained in Plymouth Sound with the ex-emperor aboard for two weeks before his exile to St Helena. Under renewed threat of invasion from across the Channel, Plymouth Sound and the dockyards at Devonport once again assumed a critical strategic significance in the defence of the nation. Though the threat never materialised, the sound was heavily fortified at the recommendation of Lord Palmerston with early 19th-century gun emplacements installed at Mount Edgcumbe and St Nicholas Island (now Drake's Island), and with the construction of forts guarding the port on the headlands at the mouth of the harbour.

Devonport became the departure point of many historic sea voyages, including the first voyage of James Cook in 1768 aboard HMS Endeavour, and the second voyage of HMS Beagle in 1831, carrying Charles Darwin.

The third Eddystone Lighthouse, Smeaton's Tower, was assembled from granite at Millbay from 1756 to 1759 and marked a major leap forward in the development of lighthouse design – the upper portion remains the most iconic landmark of the modern city.

== Modernisation and urbanisation ==
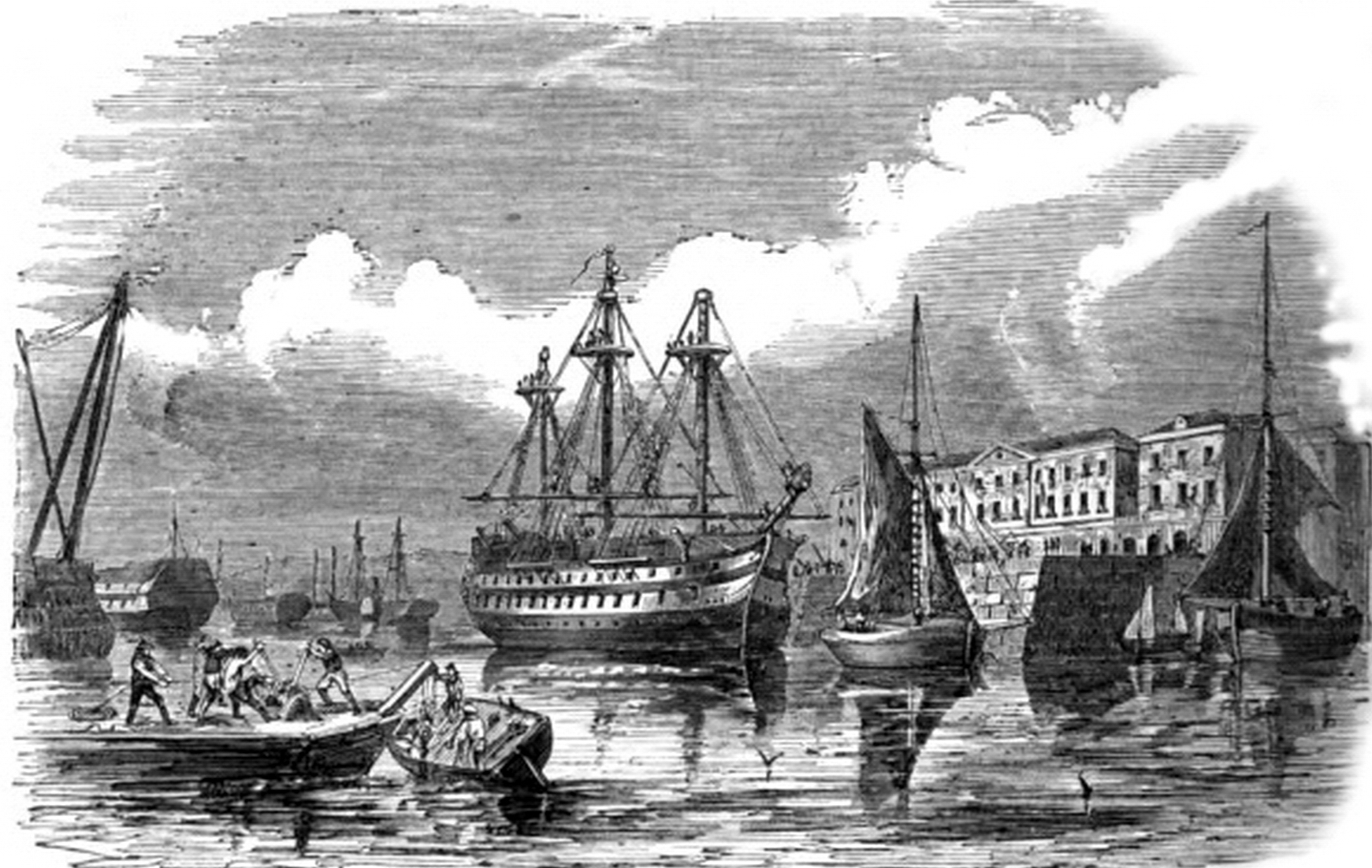
The Plymouth harbour near 1860

By comparison with the earlier eras, the later 19th century marked a period of consolidation and modernisation of a relatively stable military port industry, gradual decline in the importance of commercial trade and some growth in passenger shipping at the Millbay Docks which set the template until well into modern period. The railways arrived early in Plymouth, with industrial tramways serving the naval dockyard as early as 1724, and steam arriving with the South Devon Railway in 1848.

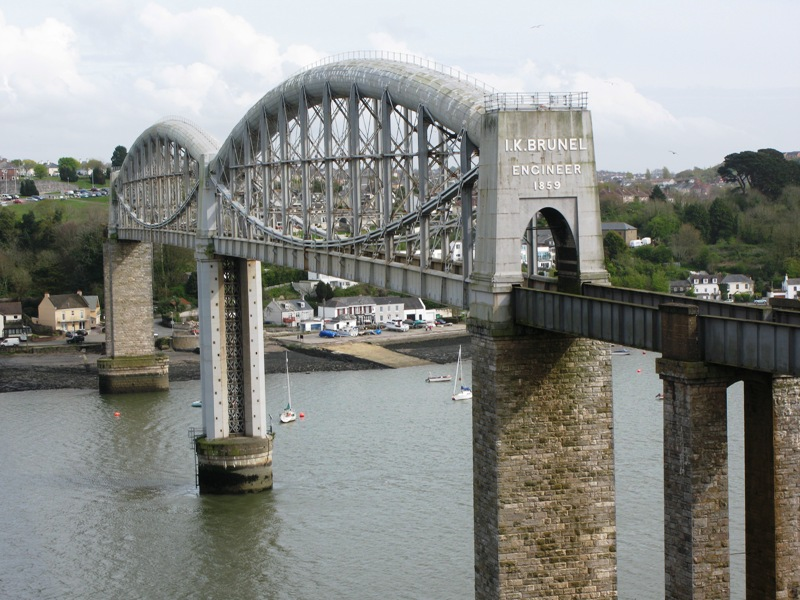
The Royal Albert Bridge, built in 1859.

Isambard Kingdom Brunel designed and constructed the iconic Royal Albert Bridge, completed 1859, for the Great Western Railway which did much to connect the isolated population of the Three Towns with the rest of the country. However, high rents in the cramped ancient tenements had resulted in overcrowding and unsanitary conditions documented in an 1852 Government report following the Public Health Act 1848, which suggested that conditions were the worst in Europe with the exception of Warsaw. The damning findings of the report resulted in large scale slum clearances of most of the ancient parts of the city and substantial public housing improvements.

The Guildhall, Law Courts and Municipal Offices were constructed in the 1870s in a French Gothic style and reflected the burgeoning civic pride in Plymouth as the commercial head of the Three Towns; most of the complex was later destroyed, however about one third, including the tower was remodelled in the 1950s. The bid for city status was eventually granted in 1928 and constituted as the City of Plymouth.

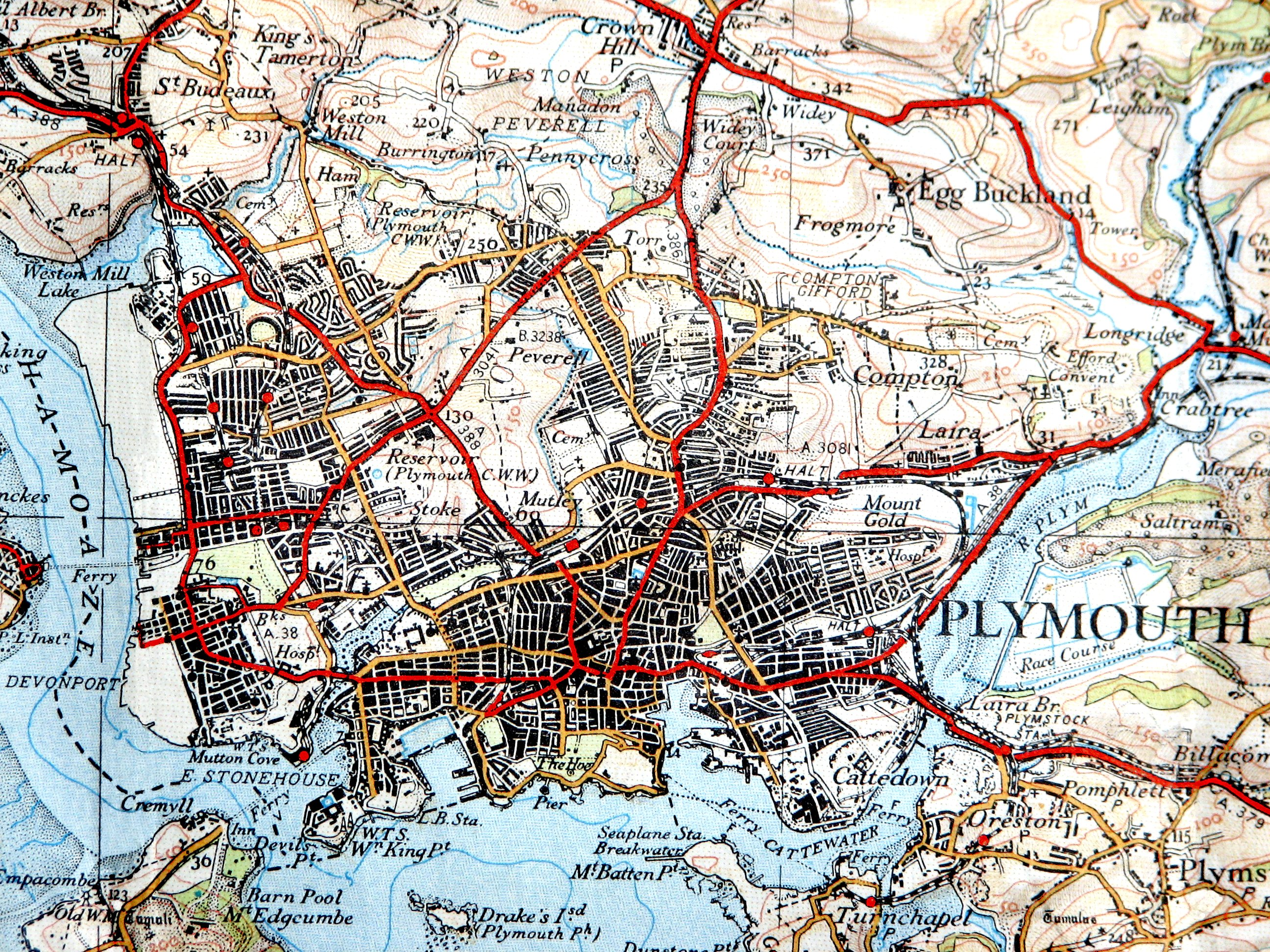
Part of an Ordnance Survey 1" map showing Plymouth in 1936

Until World War II, the port at Millbay Docks was used for Transatlantic liner shipping, as it had been since the 1870s. Many of the surviving crew of the RMS Titanic disaster disembarked at Millbay docks on their return to England in 1912.

During the First World War, Devonport Dockyard provided employment to around 20,000 workers, but after the war the ending of the naval arms race, the need to economise on government expenditure (culminating in the Geddes Axe), and the Great Depression jointly led to large declines in its workforce, down to a low of under 11,000 by 1933. Despite this, Plymouth suffered less than cities that were dependent on commercial shipbuilders: in 1932 unemployment in Plymouth was 20.6% compared to 30.7% in Glasgow and 34.2% in Barrow-in-Furness. A number of representations were made to the Admiralty for alleviating the high unemployment, including transferring part of the Dockyard's workforce and facilities to a commercial employer, converting part of the yard into a commercial port and the use of dockyard labour and facilities to do commercial work under the Admiralty's control. Only the last of these suggestions was adopted, and only to a limited degree. The 1931 census showed that despite the decline in Dockyard employment, 40% of the employed population of Plymouth were still working in either "Public Administration and Defence" or "Shipbuilding and Marine Engineering"—this is compared to 11% for the country as a whole—and 21% of the employed were directly engaged upon defence.

Plymouth Pier, 1884 – the last by noted pier builder Eugenius Birch – and the unique Art Deco Lido Tinside Pool of 1935 were constructed as seafront leisure facilities reflecting the growing importance of tourism to the new city's economy.

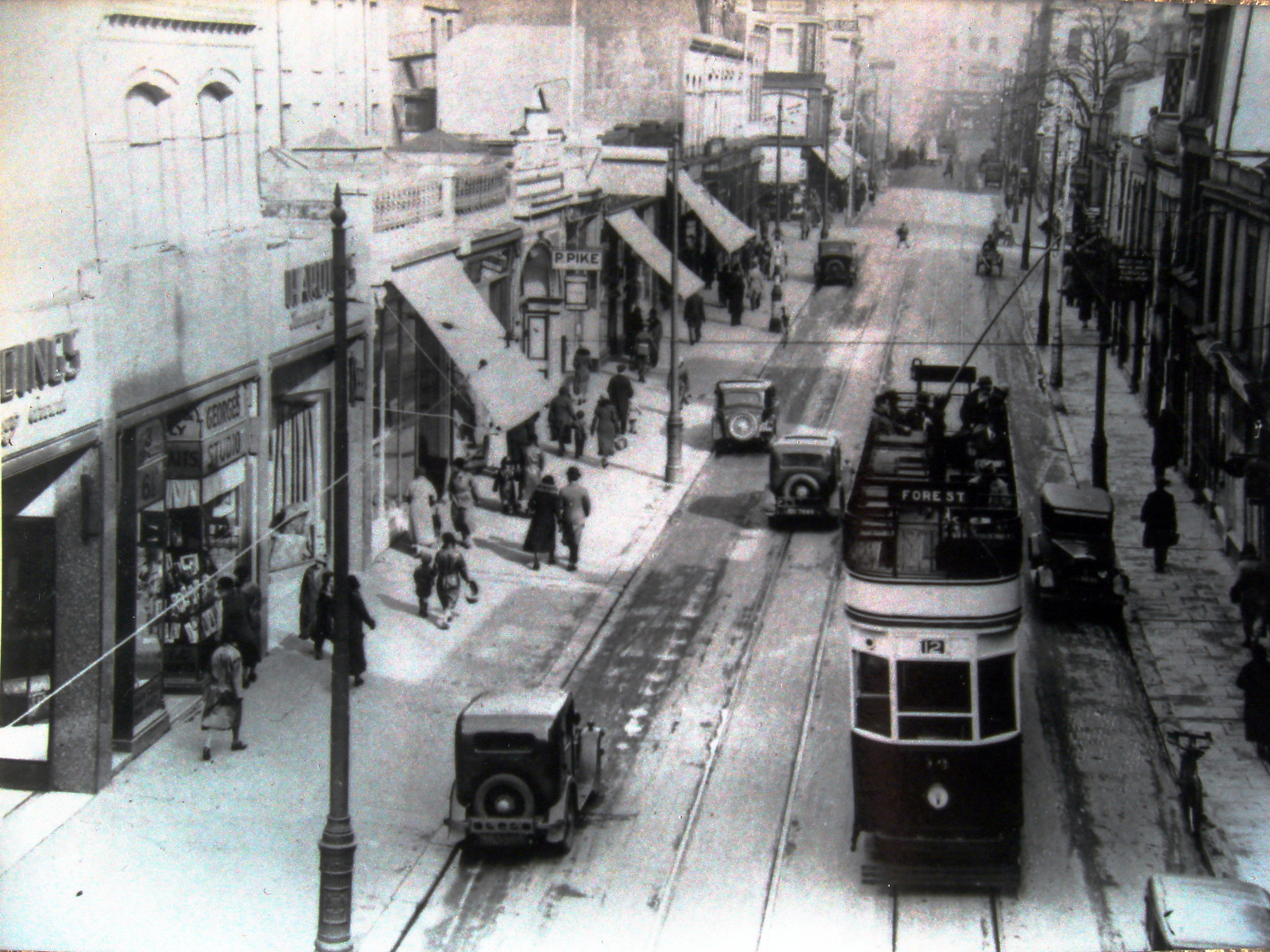
Union Street before 1941 showing the trams that used to run through the city

=== World War II ===
Due to its strategic proximity to the northern coast of France and its naval pre-eminence, the city was heavily bombed by the Luftwaffe during the Second World War, an event known as the Plymouth Blitz. Although the dockyards were the principal targets, the two main shopping centres, most of the civic buildings and over 3,700 houses were completely destroyed and more than 1,000 civilians lost their lives. Charles Church has been left in its ruined state as a memorial to those civilians who died. On the Hoe stands a memorial to the many members of the Royal Navy from Plymouth who were killed in both World Wars.

In June 1944 Plymouth was one of the principal staging posts for the Normandy Landings. General Omar Bradley and the 1st US Army embarked here for the landings at Omaha Beach and Utah Beach and after the initial bombardments some of the American battleships came to the dockyard for repair.

=== Postwar period ===
In 1943, Sir Patrick Abercrombie published his Plan for Plymouth in response to the devastation inflicted upon the city. Its Beaux Arts-inspired vision called for the removal of the few remaining pre-war buildings in the city centre and their replacement with wide, modern boulevards aligned east–west linked by a grand north–south avenue (Armada Way) linking the railway station with Plymouth Hoe.

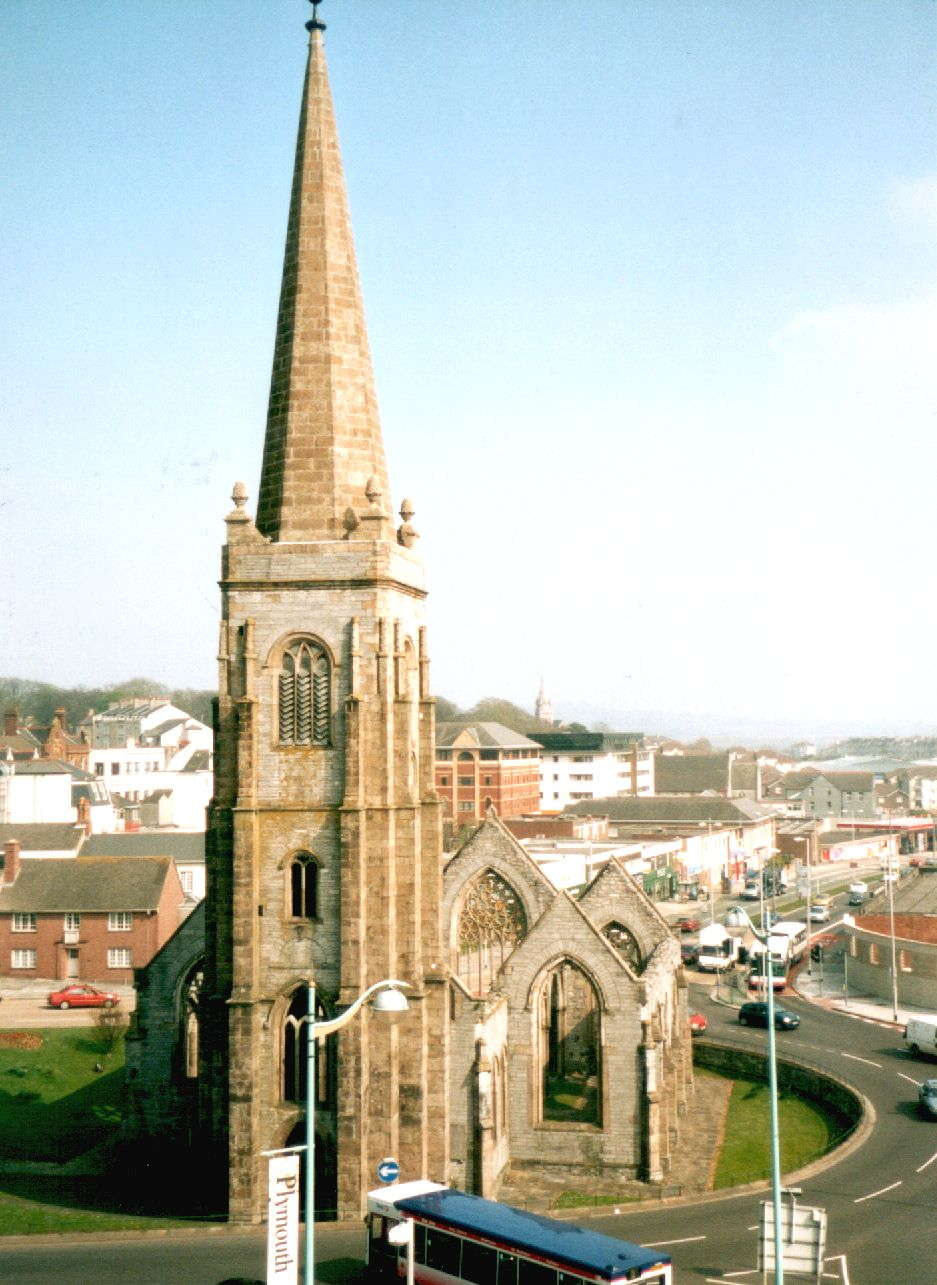
The ruined Charles Church, the city's memorial to the civilians killed in the Blitz.

The Plan had to deal not only with the effects of the War, but also the pre-war defects of the city: much of the housing and many narrow streets were overcrowded. The main concern was for housing, and many prefabs were built by 1946, followed by over a thousand permanent council houses built each year from 1951 to 1957 as part of the 'Homes fit for heroes' programme. The first estate, at Efford, was started in 1945 and this was rapidly followed by many others, laid out according to the Plan. By 1964 over 20,000 new homes had been built, more than 13,500 of them permanent council homes and 853 built by the Admiralty. Despite all this building, in 1971 over ten percent of the houses in Plymouth were still occupied by more than one family.

After the war, the Admiralty required more space in the city and by 1950, after much discussion, 50 acres (200,000 m^{2}) were allocated. Devonport Dockyard was kept busy for many years refitting aircraft carriers such as the Ark Royal. By the time this work ended in the late 1970s the nuclear submarine base was operational. In the 1950s a new Royal Navy Engineering College was built at Manadon, and HMS Raleigh, the current basic training facility of the Royal Navy, was opened west of Torpoint. The army had substantially left the city by 1971, with Raglan Barracks and Plumer Barracks pulled down in the 1960s. However the Royal Citadel has been home to 29th Commando Regiment Royal Artillery since 1962, and 42 Commando Royal Marines has been based at Bickleigh Barracks 5.5 miles (8.9 km) north-east of the Barbican, since 1971.

In 1962, Plymouth Civic Centre was constructed as a modernist 'slab-and-block' set piece to accommodate the city offices lost in the pre-War Guildhall complex – it was listed in 2007 to prevent its demolition.

On 28 May 1967, Sir Francis Chichester returned to Plymouth after the first single handed Clipper Route circumnavigation of the world and was greeted by an estimated crowd of a million spectators on the Hoe and every vantage point from Rame Head to Wembury.

In 1988, to mark the 400th anniversary of defeat of the Spanish Armada the majority of the city centre was pedestrianised, closed to vehicular traffic and the city centre was landscaped and a new shopping centre named the Armada Centre marked the transition to the tourist economy as the employment at the Dockyards began to fall away.

On 12 August 2021, a mass shooting occurred in Plymouth, where a gunman, identified as 22-year-old Jake Davison, killed five people and injured two others, before killing himself. His motive remains undetermined, although his online activity made multiple references to the incel subculture. The incident was the first fatal mass shooting in the United Kingdom since the Cumbria shootings of 2010.

== See also ==
- Timeline of Plymouth
- Fortifications of Plymouth
