= 2008 Exeter attempted bombing =

Failed bombing attempt in England

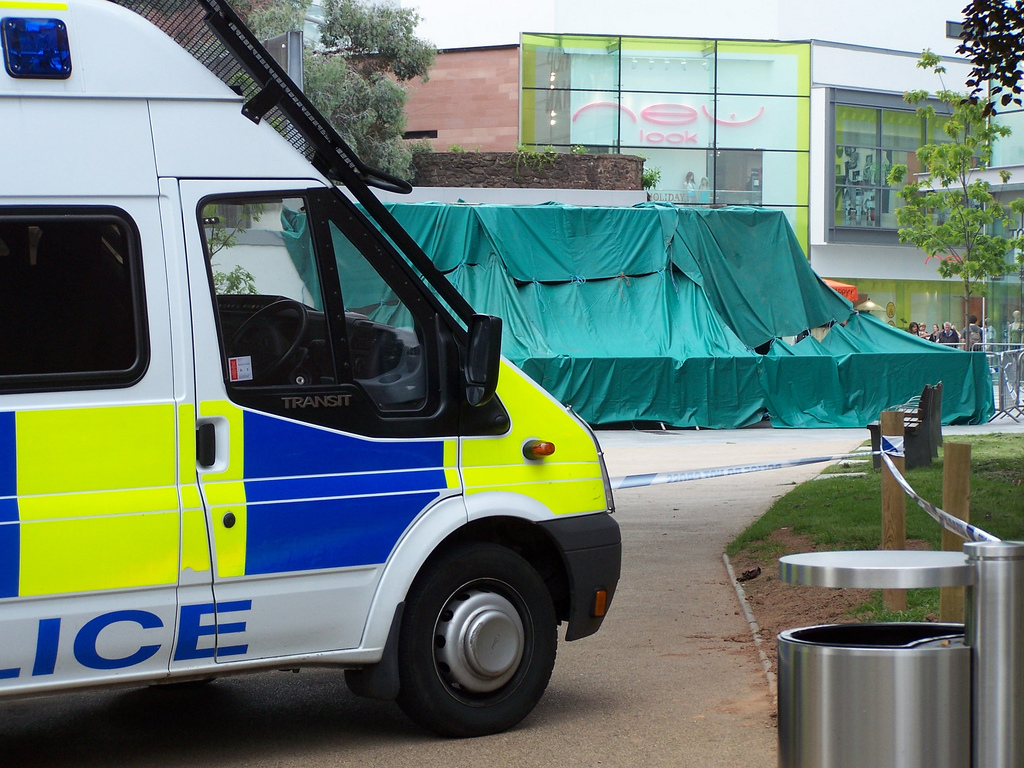
- A police van guards the Giraffe cafe and restaurant.
- Location: 50°43′29″N 3°31′36″W; Exeter, Devon, England
- Date: 22 May 2008; 12:50 (UTC+1)
- Target: Princesshay shopping precinct
- Weapon: Nail bomb
- Deaths: 0
- Injuries: 1 (the bomber)
- Perpetrator: Nicky Reilly

The Exeter bombing was a failed bombing attempt that took place on 22 May 2008, at the Giraffe cafe and restaurant in Princesshay, Exeter, England. The bomber, Nicky Reilly (5 February 1986 – 19 October 2016), 22, from Plymouth, who was the only person injured, pleaded guilty on 15 October 2008 to launching the attempted suicide attack.

== Attack ==
The attack took place at 12:50 while the bomber was inside a locked cubicle in the restaurant toilets. Witnesses in and around the restaurant reported hearing a loud bang. Most dismissed it, thinking the sound had come from a nearby building site. Another witness reported that it "sounded more like gunshots than a bomb, like a lightbulb exploding". Police were immediately called to the scene and the restaurant was evacuated.

=== Evacuation ===
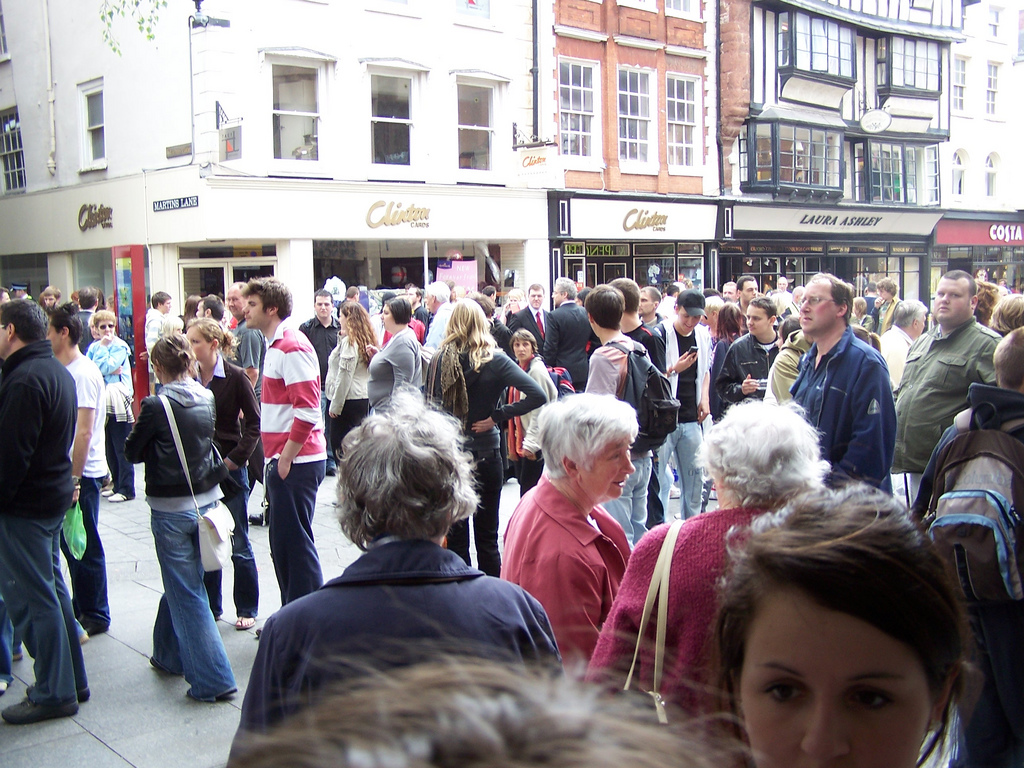
Thousands were evacuated from the city centre.

After the restaurant was evacuated, police evacuated and cordoned off the immediate area in fear of another device. This cordon was originally confined to the Princesshay area, but was later extended to cover the whole of the city centre, from the bottom of the High Street to Sidwell Street. Another device was found in the vicinity of the cafe, but was disabled by a bomb disposal team.

=== Timeline ===
==== Thursday 22 May 2008 ====
- 10:20: Nicky Reilly boards a double-decker Stagecoach bus number X38 in Bretonside bus station in Plymouth bound for Paris Street, Exeter.
- 12:05: Reilly arrives in Exeter.
- 12:50: Police and ambulance services receive calls from members of the public reporting that a man has been injured in an explosion at the Giraffe cafe and restaurant in Princesshay.
- 13:00: A 100 m cordon is established and police begin to evacuate the area.
- 13:40: Police confirm it is believed an explosion has occurred.
- 14:00: The injured man is taken to the Royal Devon and Exeter Hospital.
- 14:20: Bomb disposal officers arrive at the scene with sniffer dogs.
- 15:00: The city centre, including Princesshay, the High Street, Paris Street and part of Sidwell Street, is cordoned off and evacuated by police.
- 15:25: Police confirm that a man is in custody following the explosion.
- 16:15: Bomb disposal experts prepare to enter the Giraffe restaurant. Police reveal they have been called to three other reports of suspicious devices in the city centre – at Primark, McDonald's and on a bicycle – but all have been found to be false alarms.
- 17:15: Forensic officers begin to examine the Giraffe restaurant after bomb disposal experts declare the scene safe.
- 18:50: Police reveal two devices have been found, one of which exploded and another that was made safe.
- 19:00: A phased lifting of the cordons begins and workers are allowed to return to shops and offices within the exclusion zone to collect their belongings, six hours after they were evacuated. Motorists are also able to retrieve their cars from the car parks in Princesshay and Southernhay.

==== Friday 23 May ====
- 12:00: Police and business leaders hold a press conference regarding the previous day's events.
- 12:47: The police reveal CCTV images of Reilly and appeal for witnesses on the X38 bus from Plymouth Bretonside to Paris Street bus station, Exeter.
- ~13:00: A bomb disposal team arrive at Reilly's home in Plymouth as police investigate his flat.
- ~14:00: Part of Plymouth is sealed off after a suspect package is found. It is later found not to be a threat.
- ~15:00: Armed police target two men who are drinking at the Bagatelle cafe in Plymouth city centre. One is arrested and the other is said to be helping police.

==== Saturday 24 May ====
- ~11:00: Businesses in both cities reveal that custom is back to normal.

==== Monday 26 May ====
- ~14:00: Nicky Reilly is discharged from hospital and into police custody.

== Aftermath ==
The large cordon set up around the bomb site caused considerable disruption. Not only were shops along the High Street shut, but the city's main bus operator Stagecoach Devon had to re-route their buses causing traffic delays. The city's bus station was also evacuated. It was many hours after the attack that the cordon, which had stretched to include Exeter's bus station, was reduced, and many roads surrounding the shopping centre re-opened On Friday, all shops – except the restaurant involved – were re-opened as usual. The incident was estimated to have cost the local economy approximately £2.5 million.

=== Investigations ===
A team of about twenty specialists (including forensic officers, intelligence experts and detectives) from Scotland Yard's Counter Terrorism branch SO15, was brought in to help the Devon and Cornwall Police with their investigations. Soon after the arrest police began searching the Muslim Community Centre in St Jude's, Plymouth.

== Arrests ==
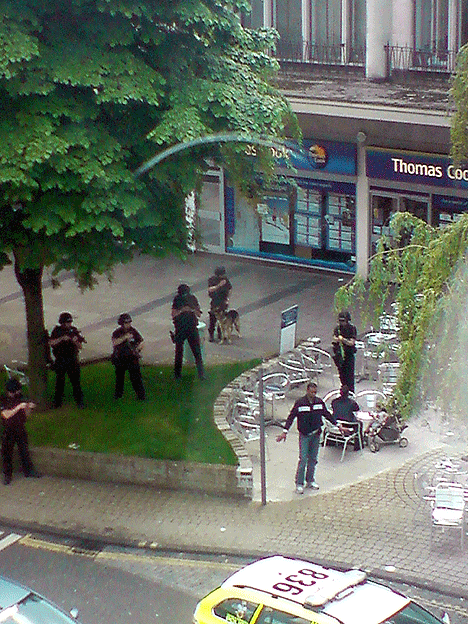
The armed arrest in Plymouth

Since the explosion in Exeter a total of four arrests were made in connection with the incident. Under the Terrorism Act 2006 a person arrested for terrorism offences can be detained in police custody for 28 days without being charged.

=== Nicky Reilly ===
Nicky Raymond Reilly (later known as Mohamed Abdulaziz Rashid Saeed-Alim), aged 22, was born in Plymouth, where he lived with his mother, Kim. He had previously been detained in a mental health hospital. It was subsequently reported that he had learning difficulties and Asperger's syndrome. After his conversion to Islam, he changed his name and came under the influence of Pakistani religious extremists, who radicalised him into detonating the nail bomb in Exeter.

On 3 June 2008, he was charged with three offences, one under the Terrorism Act 2006 and a further two under the Explosive Substances Act 1883. He appeared before magistrates in a secure court in Westminster, London on 4 June 2008 and was remanded in custody.

On 15 October 2008, Reilly pleaded guilty to charges of attempted murder and preparing a terrorist attack. Information released after his guilty plea revealed that Reilly was obsessed with martyrdom and wanted to cause as much death and injury as possible. On 30 January 2009, Reilly was sentenced to life imprisonment with a minimum term of 18 years.

On 20 October 2016, it was reported that Reilly—then 30 years old—had died at HMP Manchester. On 7 November, an inquest into his death was opened and adjourned. The inquest concluded in December 2018. It concluded that Reilly was found hanged from a light fitting in his cell and that it was likely that he acted impulsively without the intent to kill himself.

=== Other arrests ===
On 23 May 2008, there was an evacuation of Plymouth city centre in which armed police arrested another person. A second individual was detained and helped police with their enquiries, but was later released. At 17:30 on 28 May 2008, a fourth man was detained for questioning. One of the men detained under suspicion of being involved was Muslim preacher, Mansour Al-Anezi. Al-Anezi, who had been banned from preaching at his local Mosque following concerns by the local community due to his anti-Western views, was suspected of radicalising Reilly and was later associated with Manchester Arena bomber Salman Abedi.
