= Timeline of Plymouth =

Coordinates: 50.371389°N 4.142222°W

The following is a timeline of the history of the city of Plymouth, Devon, England.

== Prior to 17th century ==
- 15,125 BCE C. – The earliest known human settlement.
- 1086 – The Domesday Book records Plymouth as Sudtone (Sutton) and records only 7 households and a total annual revenue of £1. The lord of the manor before 1066 had been Edward the Confessor.
- 1254 – Town status recognised.
- 1276 – Plymouth first recorded as a borough.
- 1291 – St. Andrew church built.
- 1292 – Returned first members to parliament.
- 1371 – Royal Chapel of St Katherine-upon-the-Hoe licensed.
- early 15th C. – Plymouth Castle built.
- 1403 – Town burned by Bretons.
- 1404 – Town wall constructed.
- 1431 – Dominican monastery built.
- 1439
  - Town granted charter by Parliament.
  - Market and fair active.
- 1532 – Birth of Sir John Hawkins naval commander.
- 1542 – Antiquary John Leland visits and records "The towne of Plymmouth is very large."
- 1572 – Grammar school founded.
- 1577 – Francis Drake's circumnavigation began in Plymouth.
- 1579 – Plague.
- 1580 – 26 September: Francis Drake's ship Golden Hind returns to Plymouth at the conclusion of his circumnavigation which began in 1577.
- 1581 – Plague.
- 1588 – 19 July: Fifty-five English ships sail from Plymouth under the command of Lord Howard of Effingham and Sir Francis Drake to fight the Spanish Armada. The fleets first engage on 21 July off the Eddystone Rocks.
- 1591 – 24 April: Drake's Leat first brings fresh water to Plymouth from Dartmoor.

== 17th–18th centuries ==
- 1620 – 6 September: Mayflower ship departs for New England, arriving in November.
- 1644 – The Siege of Plymouth by Royalist forces under Sir Richard Grenville in the English Civil War.
- 1652 – 26 August: Battle of Plymouth occurs offshore in the First Anglo-Dutch War.
- 1657 – Charles Church built.
- 1658 – Post house established.
- 1670 – Citadel built on the Hoe.
- 1671 – Royal Chapel of St Katherine-upon-the-Hoe rebuilt (approximate date).
- 1690 – 30 December: Work starts on construction of the Royal Dockyard at Devonport.
- 1694 – 3 April: First new ships launched from the Royal Dockyard: advice boats Postboy and Messenger; the first warship is launched in 1696, fifth-rate HMS Looe.
- 1696 – Work starts on Henry Winstanley's first Eddystone Lighthouse, 12 miles (19 km) off Plymouth Sound.
- 1718 – Plymouth Weekly Journal in publication.
- 1758
  - Theatre built.
  - Plymouth and Portsmouth Fortifications Act 1758 (32 Geo. 2. c. 30) passed by Parliament.
- 1759 – Smeaton's Tower completed as the third Eddystone Lighthouse.
- 1762 – Plymouth Synagogue built.
- 1768 – Cookworthy's porcelain factory established.
- 1770 – Plymouth Improvement Act 1770 (10 Geo. 3. c. 14) passed by Parliament.
- 1773 – Stonehouse Bridge constructed.
- 1781 – Plymouth (Poor Relief, etc.) Act 1781 (21 Geo. 3. c. 72) passed by Parliament.
- 1790 – New Pier constructed at Sutton Pool.
- 1793 – Plymouth Gin first produced at the Plymouth Gin Distillery.
- 1798 – 3 April: HMS Pallas wrecked offshore.
- 1800 – Guildhall built.

== 19th century ==
- 1808 – Plymouth Gazette begins publication.
- 1810 – Plymouth Proprietary Library founded.
- 1811 – Theatre/Hotel building constructed.
- 1812
  - Plymouth Institution (now The Plymouth Athenaeum) founded.
  - Plymouth Breakwater construction begins.
- 1813
  - Port of Plymouth Chamber of Commerce established.
  - Exchange building constructed.
- 1815 – 26 July: Napoleon Bonaparte enters Plymouth Sound aboard HMS Bellerophon, awaiting transportation to exile in Saint Helena.
- 1819 – The Plymouth Athenaeum building designed by John Foulston opens.
- 1820 – Plymouth Herald and Plymouth Journal newspapers begin publication.
- 1823 – 26 September: Plymouth and Dartmoor Railway (horse-worked) opened for granite traffic to Sutton Pool.
- 1826 – Plymouth Mechanics' Institute founded.
- 1828
  - Royal Union Baths built.
  - Plymouth, Devonport, and Cornwall Races begin.
- 1829
  - Museum of the Plymouth Institution built.
  - Blue Friars (club) founded.

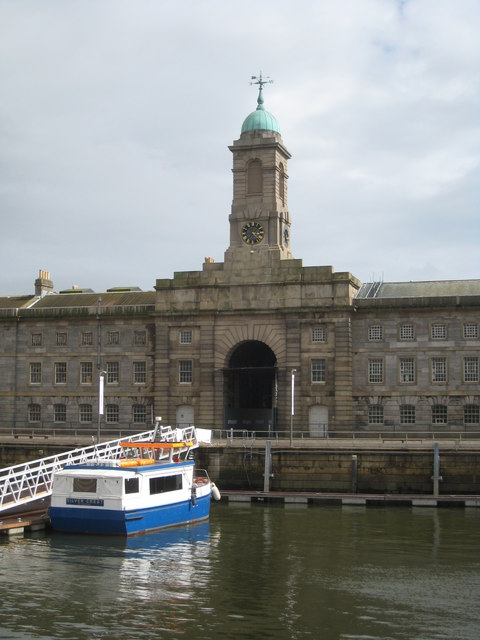
The Basin and the Melville Block at Royal William Victualling Yard

- 1831
  - Plymouth and Devonport Spring Races begin.
  - December: First meeting in England at Plymouth of the evangelical Christian movement which becomes known as the Plymouth Brethren.
- 1832 – Plymouth Times newspaper begins publication.
- 1835 – Royal William Victualling Yard construction completed.
- 1841 – Plymouth Breakwater constructed.
- 1844 – Lighthouse commissioned on Plymouth Breakwater.
- 1848 – 5 May: South Devon Railway opens to Plymouth.
- 1851
  - 25 July: First Roman Catholic Bishop of Plymouth consecrated.
  - Plymouth Institution (later The Plymouth Athenaeum) merges with Devon and Cornwall Natural History Society.
- 1856
  - Plymouth Drawing School founded.
  - St Boniface's Catholic College founded.
- 1858 – 25 March: Plymouth Cathedral (Roman Catholic) opened.
- 1859 – 3 May: Royal Albert Bridge opens linking Plymouth by rail to Saltash.
- 1860 – Royal Commission on the Defence of the United Kingdom recommends a huge programme of fortifications for Plymouth, with a projected cost of £3,020,000.
- 1862 – Plymouth Lifeboat Station in operation.
- 1863 – St. Boniface Boys' Catholic School active.
- 1865
  - Plymouth Breakwater Fort built.
  - Duke of Cornwall Hotel in business.
- 1871 – Agaton Fort built.
- 1874 – Guildhall built.
- 1877
  - Plymouth College founded as a boys' school.
  - Plymouth railway station opened.
- 1880 – Plymouth Cathedral consecrated.
- 1882 – Smeaton's Tower is dismantled at the Eddystone for re-erection on Plymouth Hoe as a memorial.
- 1886 – 16 October: Argyle F.C. play their first match.
- 1889 – Grand Theatre opens.
- 1895 – 22 April: Western Evening Herald newspaper begins publication.
- 1898
  - 5 September: New Palace Theatre of Varieties opens.
  - 21 September: Burrator Reservoir opens to supply fresh water to Plymouth from Dartmoor.
- 1899 – Plymouth Institution (later The Plymouth Athenaeum) merges with Plymouth Mechanics' Institute.

== 20th century ==
- 1910 – Population: 126,266.
- 1914 – Plymouth, Devonport and East Stonehouse merge to form the County Borough of Plymouth.
- 1928 – Plymouth attains city status.
- 1929 – Old Plymouth Society founded.
- 1933 – Western Fascist newspaper begins publication.
- 1934 – Mayflower Steps monument erected.
- 1935
  - Tinside Pool (swimming pool) opens.
  - Lord Mayor appointed.
- 1940 – Plymouth Blitz:
  - 6 July: Aerial bombing by German forces begins.
  - 27 November: Bombing starts an oil storage depot fire at Turnchapel which burns for 5 days.
- 1941 – Plymouth Blitz:
  - 15 March: Bombing in which 336 people lose their lives.
  - 20 March: A royal visit is followed by a sustained period of bombing.
- 1944
  - May: Plymouth Blitz: Aerial bombing by German forces ends: about 1,000 people have been killed, 5,000 injured, 10,000 houses destroyed and 70,000 more damaged.
  - 4 June: United States forces embarked at Saltash Passage, Cattedown, Turnchapel and other Plymouth hards set sail for the Normandy landings.
- 1945 – 29 September: Last trams in Plymouth run.
- 1958 – 5 April: Drake Cinema opens.
- 1961
  - 29 April: Westward Television begins broadcasting.
  - The Plymouth Athenaeum reopens after destruction of original building in Blitz.
- 1967
  - 1 April: Plympton and Plymstock become part of city.
  - 28 May: Sir Francis Chichester arrives back in Plymouth on his yacht, Gypsy Moth IV, after completing his single-handed voyage around the world.
- 1968 – 8 August: Royal Navy Leander-class frigate HMS Scylla is launched at HMNB Devonport, the last ship to be built in a Royal Dockyard.
- 1971
  - Mayflower Centre (sport facility) built.
  - Plymouth College of Further Education, the future City College, building erected in Devonport.
- 1975 – 19 May: Plymouth Sound (radio) begins broadcasting.
- 1982
  - 1 January: Television South West begins broadcasting.
  - St Boniface Arena opens.
- 1986 – Plymouth Citybus begins operating under this identity.
- 1991 – Plymouth Pavilions (sport facility) opens.
- 1992 – University of Plymouth chartered.
- 1994 – Marsh Mills Retail Park opens, including stores such as Sainsbury's and Homebase.
- 1998 – National Marine Aquarium opens.
- 1999 – Vue cinema opens.

== 21st century ==
- 2006 – Drake Circus Shopping Centre in business.
- 2009 – The Plymouth Athenaeum's theatre closes.
- 2010 – Radio Plymouth begins broadcasting.
- 2011 - closure of Plymouth city airport
- 2012 – The Plymouth Athenaeum celebrates bicentenary.
- 2015 – Waste incinerator (combined heat and power facility) built on former Dockyard land.
- 2017 – Beckley Point is completed.
- 2021 – Mass shooting occurs in the Keyham area of the city, killing six, including the gunman, and injuring two others.

== See also ==
- History of Plymouth
- Timelines of other cities in South West England: Bath, Bristol, Exeter
