= 2005 Palu market bombing =

Terrorist attack in Indonesia

- Location: Palu, Central Sulawesi, Indonesia
- Date: 31 December 2005; 20 years ago 7:05 am (UTC+8)
- Target: Meat market in southern Maesa district, Palu
- Attack type: Bombing, mass murder, terrorism
- Weapon: Nail bomb
- Deaths: 8
- Injuries: 53
- Perpetrator: Local Islamic militants with purported links to Jemaah Islamiyah

A market was bombed on 31 December 2005, in Palu, Central Sulawesi, Indonesia. An improvised explosive device, described as a nail bomb or similar, detonated around 7:00 a.m. within a Palu butcher's market mostly frequented by Christians shopping for New Year's Eve celebrations, killing eight people and wounding a further 53.

The bomb detonated within a partially enclosed butcher's shop that sold pig and dog meat direct to the public, both of which are forbidden under Islamic custom. A second explosive device was reportedly discovered around four metres from the initial blast site, nearby a stall selling pork, and defused.

The target, a market in a district dominated by the mostly Christian Minahasa ethnic group, may have been selected to maximize Christian casualties, as Central Sulawesi province had previously been the site of significant sectarian violence between Christian and Muslim factions that claimed over a thousand lives between 1998 and 2002. The conflict had largely been concentrated around the Poso region of the province and Palu had largely been spared wide scale violence and then Indonesian Security Minister Widodo Adisucipto suggested Jemaah Islamiyah may have been responsible for the attack, because it is related to the death of Azahari Husin in an ambush at Batu, East Java on 9 November 2005.

== The attack ==
The device, described as home-made and low-explosive, detonated at 7:05 a.m. within a meat stall in front of a house used for the slaughter of pigs and opposite the Bethel Church in the Maesa subdistrict, south of Palu. Police officials stated the bomb was filled with nails and ball bearings, and most of the victims suffered injuries to their limbs due to the shrapnel from the device. Bystanders are described as having carried the wounded from the makeshift market to a road, and placing them in passing cars to be taken to local hospitals, where at least 20 shoppers were treated for serious injuries in the attack.

Victims included Bambang Wiyono Saputra (50), Yakulina Tana (45), Agustina Mande (37) the owners of the stall, Yoppie (42) and his wife Meisye (39) and a member of the Intelligence Unit of the Tadulako District Army Command, Sgt. Tasman Lahansang.

== Investigation ==
Following the attack, President Susilo Bambang Yudhoyono denounced the bombing and conveyed his condolences to the families of the victims. Roadblocks were established in the Palu region and a team from Criminal Investigation Agency (Bareskrim), was deployed directly to Palu to aid the ongoing investigation.

A single person was arrested the same day, according to a report by provincial police chief Oegroseno, although it was unclear whether he was a direct suspect, police would only say that he had been acting suspiciously and asked vendors where they lived.

Convicted terrorist financier Eko Budi Wardoyo is suspected of involvement in the Palu market bombing following his involvement in the murder of Reverend Susianti Tinulele, a female pastor killed on 18 July 2004 during an attack on a South Palu church that also wounded four teenagers. Wardoyo was sentenced to 10 years imprisonment in 2010 for funding that attack and giving assistance to the criminals found responsible for the 2005 Tentena market bombings that claimed 22 lives on 28 May 2005.

Another bomb was discovered among street vendors near Palu Plaza during the Idul Fitri festival in 2008 and detonated by the local Palu bomb squad without incident.
