= 2016 Budapest bombing =

Attempted murder case in Budapest, Hungary

Coordinates: 47.5036°N 19.0651°E

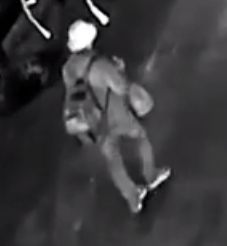
- The perpetrator some minutes before the explosion
- Location: Oktogon in Budapest
- Date: 24 September 2016; 22:36:18 (UTC+1)
- Target: Police officers
- Attack type: Bombing
- Weapon: Nail bomb
- Deaths: 0
- Injuries: 2
- Perpetrator: László Gergely P.

The 2016 Budapest bombing occurred on 24 September when a young man detonated a nail bomb in an attempt to kill two patrolling police officers. A policeman and a policewoman (the latter, coincidentally, the poster face of the Hungarian police's recruiting campaign) suffered injuries but survived the attack. After the incident the police chief in charge announced a full-scale investigation and promised to give 10 million HUF to whoever reported the perpetrator. According to Zsolt Molnár, the chairman of the National Security Commission of the Hungarian Parliament, it is unlikely that the attack had anything to do with other terror-related incidents in Europe in 2016.

== Perpetrator ==
The perpetrator, László Gergely P., was caught on 19 October 2016 by the Counter Terrorism Centre in Keszthely. The 23-year-old man is a Hungarian citizen without any criminal history; his father was previously the mayor of Karmacs, a small village in Zala county. According to prosecutors, he planned to blackmail the Hungarian Ministry of Interior for €1 million.

== Trial ==
The perpetrator's trial started on January 31, 2018. On September 12, he was sentenced to prison for life with the possibility of parole after 30 years.
