= Richard Izacke =

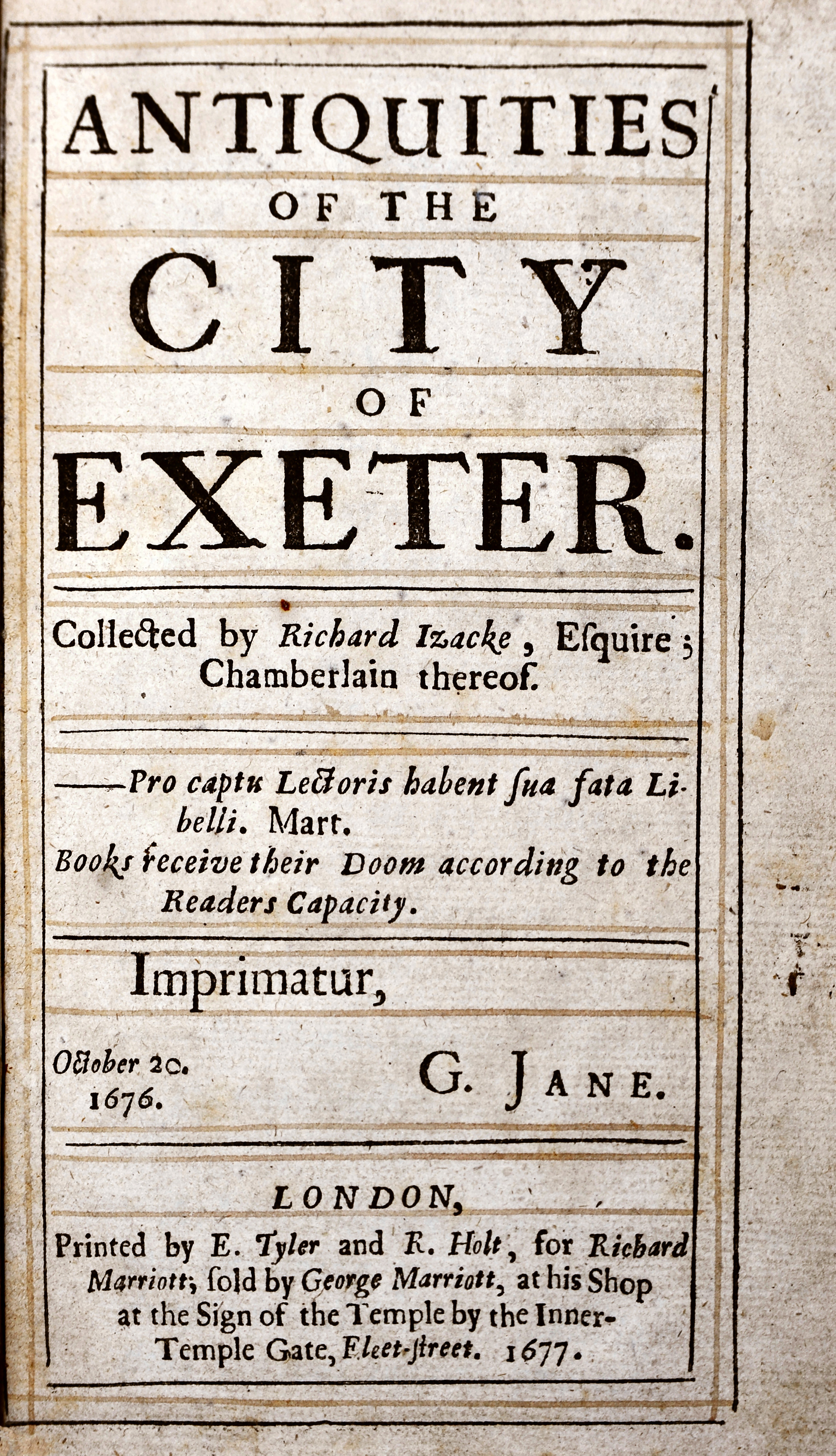
Title page of the first edition of Izacke's Antiquities of the City of Exeter

Richard Izacke (c.1624–1698) of Devon was an antiquarian and lawyer who served as Chamberlain of the City of Exeter. His history, Antiquities of the City of Exeter, was first published in 1677.

== Biography ==
Baptised on 8 February 1624 at Ottery St Mary, he was the eldest son of Samuel Izacke of Exeter, who was apparently a lawyer and member of the Inner Temple (1617).

On 20 April 1641, Izacke was admitted as commoner to Exeter College, Oxford, but left the university at the end of 1642 because of the Civil War. In November 1641 he entered the Inner Temple and was called to the bar in 1650. On 25 October 1653 he became Chamberlain of Exeter and on 15 December 1681 Town Clerk of Exeter. By his wife Katherine, of unknown family, he had children including Samuel Izacke (born 1663), who also became Chamberlain of Exeter and an antiquarian.

Izacke's father died in 1681 or 1682 and according to his will, Richard had behaved badly towards him by "his disobedience in his marriage". Despite this he bequeathed him a house in Holy Trinity parish, Exeter and leasehold property in Tipton, Ottery St. Mary, on the condition that he behaved well towards his stepmother, brothers, and sisters in the future.

Izacke was buried in Ottery St Mary parish church on 18 March 1698.

== Works ==
As Chamberlain of Exeter, Izacke could access the city's archives and using these resources he produced a manuscript history of the city, dedicating it to the city's corporation in 1665. The history was first published in London in 1677 as Antiquities of the City of Exeter. Later editions were undertaken by his son Samuel, and had greatly expanded titles. (Note: For example, the title of the 1724 second edition is: Remarkable Antiquities of the City of Exeter: Giving an account of The Laws and Customs of the Place; the Offices, Court of Judicature, Gates, Walls, Rivers, Churches and Immunities; the Titles and Privileges of the Several Corporations and their distinct Coats of Arms finely engraven on Copper-Plates: with a Catalogue of all the Bishops, Mayors, and Sheriffs, from the year 1049, to 1677.)

The largest section of the first edition consists of 180 pages of "Memorials": short descriptions of events related to Exeter, ordered by year from 1200 to 1676. Research has shown that the entries up to 1590 were substantially copied from a manuscript chronicle in the city archives that had been written by John Hooker, the first Chamberlain of Exeter, who had died in 1601. Izacke's unacknowledged and sometimes inaccurate plagiarism of Hooker's work, as well as the errors that he himself made, have caused his History to be subjected to much criticism.

However, despite its faults, the book was republished seven times up to 1757. After a reprint of the first edition in 1681, there was a gap of over forty years before the second edition was published by Izacke's son Samuel. Following this there were five more reissues, all with unchanged text, but slightly different title pages.

Izacke's manuscript history of 1665 provided the content for another book, first published in 1736 by his grandson (also named Samuel). This was about legacies left to the poor. (Note: The full title of the first edition is: An Alphabetical Register of divers Persons, who, by their Last Wills, Grants, Feoffments, and other Deeds, have given Tenements, Rents, Annuities, and, Monies, towards the Relief of the Poor of the County of Devon, and City and County of Exon; and likewise to many other Cities and Towns in England.) Four further editions were published under various titles, the last in 1820. (Note: The title of the last edition is: An Account of the Legacies left to the Poor of the City of Exeter, from the year 1164 to 1674, inclusive; First printed in the year 1736, by Samuel Izacke, Gent. With remarks, detecting the Misapplication of some of the Charities. Reprinted in the year 1751, under the title of The Rights and Privileges of the Freemen of Exeter; and again in the year 1785, by T. Brice, With an Index, pointing out the Situation of the Lands given to each Charity. Now re-published, with Additional Remarks and the original Title Page and Dedication, to which is added an Appendix containing an Account of several charitable Donations not noticed by Izacke, or given since the year 1674. By William Carwithen, A.M. Rector of St. Mary Steps, Exeter.)

=== Published editions ===
- Izacke, Richard, (improved and continued to the year 1724 by Samuel Izacke), Remarkable Antiquities of the City of Exeter, 3rd Edition, London, 1731
