= Plumer Barracks =

- Plymouth
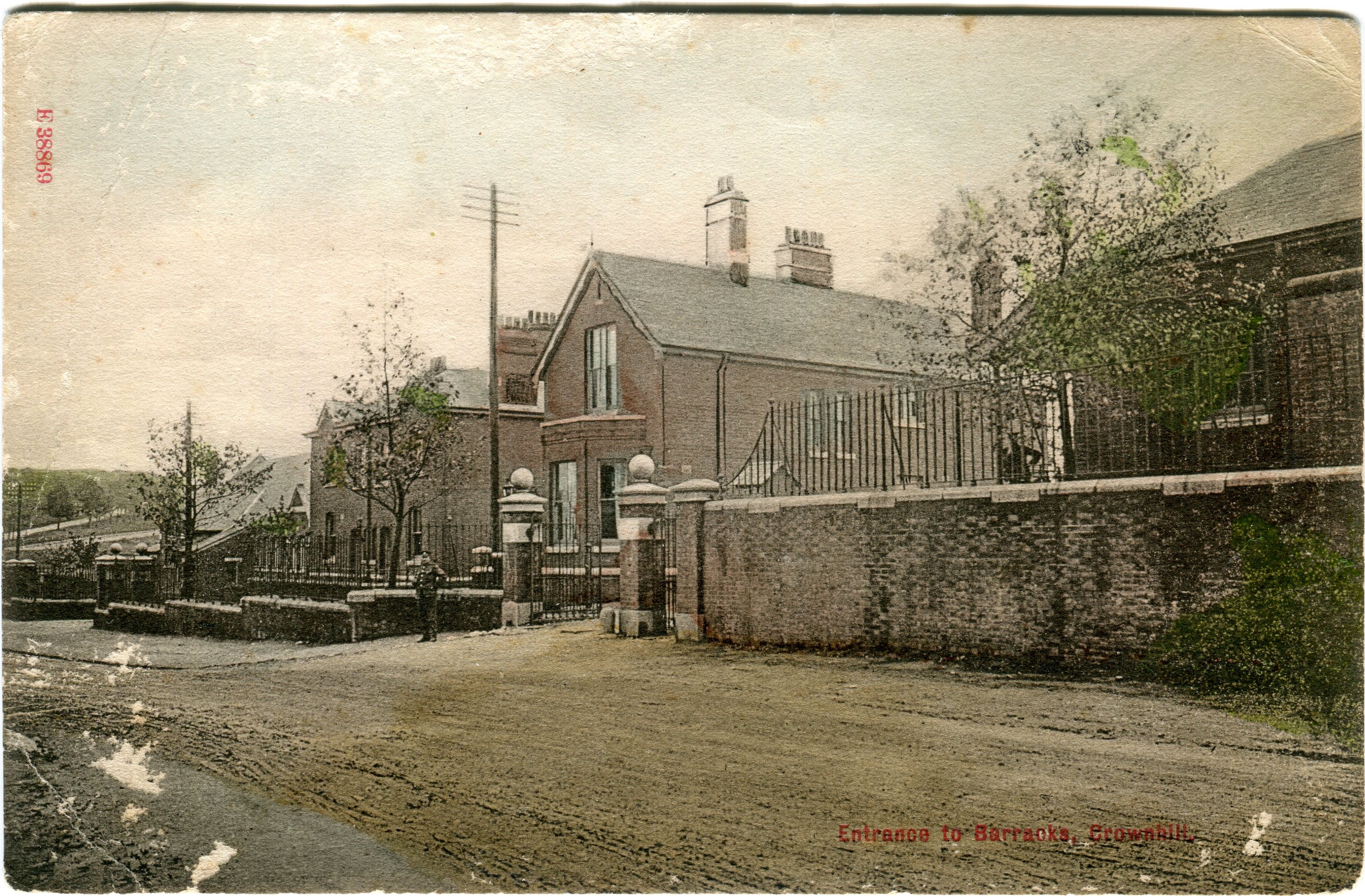
- Plumer Barracks

Site information
- Type: Barracks

Location
- Location within Devon
- Coordinates: 50.40827°N 4.13127°W

Site history
- Built: 1891
- Built for: War Office
- In use: 1891–1966

Plumer Barracks was a military installation at Crownhill in Plymouth.

== History ==
The barracks were built as "Crownhill Barracks" to accommodate regiments in transit for operations overseas in 1891. Just prior to the First World War it was home to the 2nd Battalion, the Sherwood Foresters. It was expanded with four additional barrack blocks towards the end of the war. Maps show a garrison church, a parade ground and various "hutments", and there was a boundary fence around the site. The chaplain at the garrison church, which was consecrated in memory of Saint Alban, allowed local civilian residents to worship at the church.

The barracks were further enlarged in 1922, and were renamed "Plumer Barracks" after Field Marshal Lord Plumer in the early 1930s. Light tanks supplied for the mechanisation of 10th Royal Hussars were delivered there in 1937. It served as the home of 20th Training Centre Royal Engineers in the early years of the Second World War. A sapper was killed in a mine explosion at the barracks in July 1941.

The barracks were then used by the United States Army after the US entered the war in December 1941. Considerable landscaping improvements were necessary after the United States Army left. Controversy arose over the costs and the local member of parliament, Lucy Middleton, raised the matter in the House of Commons.

After the war, the barracks were used by a Junior Leaders battalion. A serious incident arose in October 1954 when a boy was beaten up by fellow soldiers. He died of his injuries and that matter was also raised in the House of Commons, this time by the member of parliament for Central Norfolk, Sir Frank Medlicott. In May 1958 members of the Junior Leaders battalion led a programme of hymn-singing which was broadcast as part of the Sunday Half-Hour on the BBC Light Programme.

The 1st battalion the Devonshire and Dorset Regiment was based there from 1961 to 1963. However, the barracks were becoming dilapidated and, although alternative uses for the barracks were considered, the buildings were demolished in September 1966. The site was subsequently occupied by a large office block known as "Plumer House" which was built in the 1970s. It initially accommodated the Land Registry but, in 2012, it was acquired by Plymouth Community Homes for use as its headquarters. A BBC transmitter station was also erected on the site in the 1970s.
