= Samuel Izacke =

Samuel Izacke (fl. 1723) of Devon was Chamberlain of the City of Exeter and an antiquarian.

He was the son of Richard Izacke (c.1624–1698) and his wife Katherine, of Devon. He was a lawyer who served as Chamberlain of the City of Exeter. He was an antiquarian, who produced a second edition of a book by his father, which has been described as "a careless compilation".
