= Princesshay =

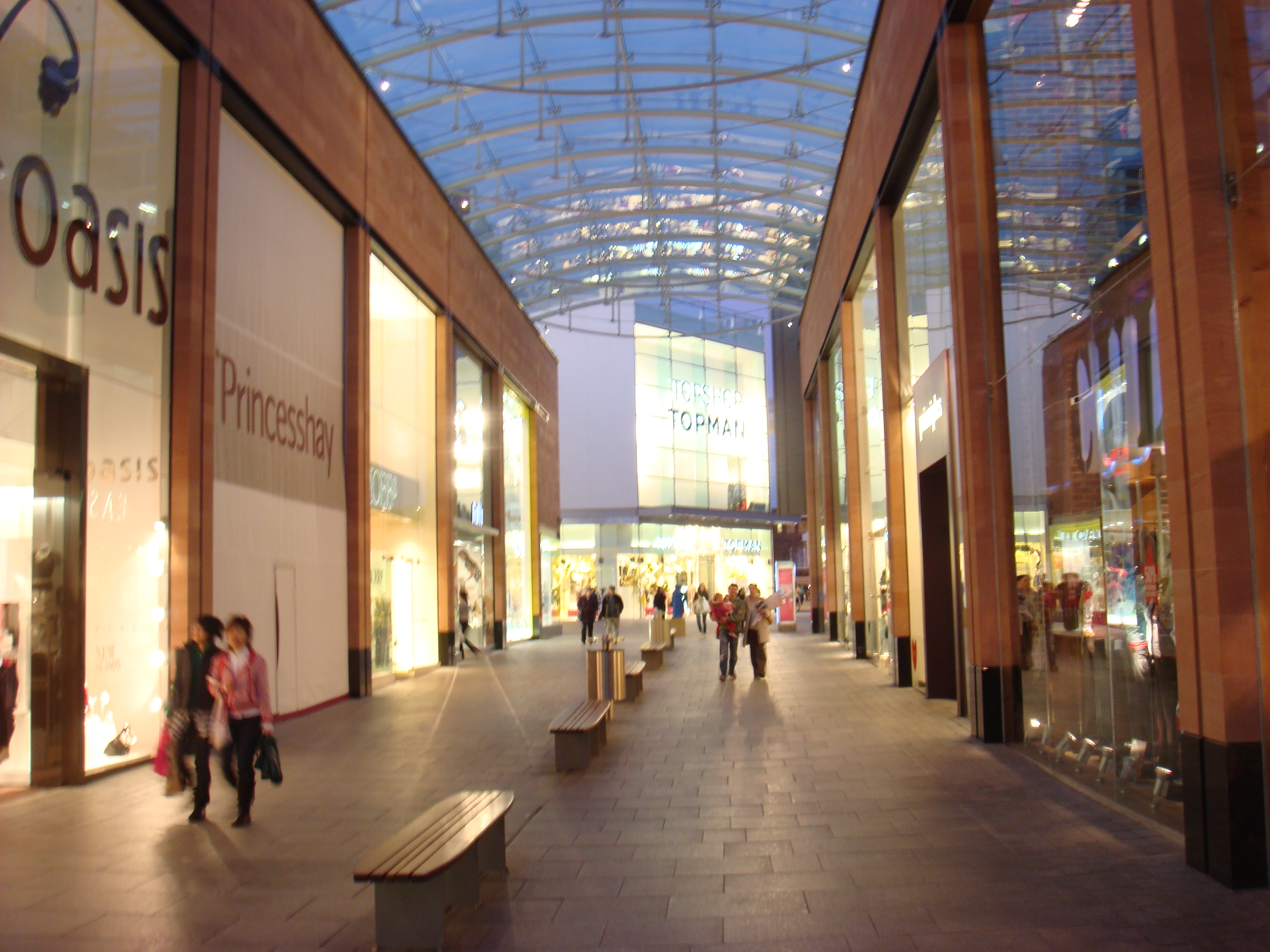
- Location: Exeter, Devon, England
- Coordinates: 50.72455°N 3.52775°W
- Opened: 20 September 2007
- Developer: Land Securities
- Manager: Savills
- Owner: Frasers Group
- Num. of stores: 65
- Num. of anchor tenants: 2 (Fat Face and next)
- Floor area: 530,000 sq ft (49,000 m^{2})
- Parking: 510 places
- Website: princesshay.co.uk

Princesshay is a shopping precinct in the city Exeter, Devon, England. Its original configuration was built in the early 1950s to replace buildings severely damaged in World War II Baedeker Blitz. From 2005 the precinct and some surrounding buildings in Bedford St were demolished in preparation for building a new modern shopping centre, which opened in September 2007.

== History ==
The original Princesshay opened in the 1950s. Princesshay was the first pedestrianised shopping street in the country, running from Bedford Street to Eastgate House, roughly parallel with High Street. The name was also used for the entire post-war development on the south side of the High Street between Paris Street and the Cathedral precinct, lying north of Southernhay. It replaced the pre-war area known as Bedford Circus (which included the Eastgate Arcade) that was levelled by the City Council following damage in the Blitz. Before building commenced, a plaque was unveiled at the site on 21 October 1949 by Princess Elizabeth after whom the development was named.

After demolition of the precinct started in 2005, archaeological work was undertaken owing to its potential interest, being close to the centre of the ancient Roman town Isca Dumnoniorum and being continuously inhabited since that time. Among finds were over a ton of Roman tile fragments, rare early-15th-century pottery and 144 coins, one of which, dated to around 1200, was minted in the city.

The post-war buildings have been replaced with a modern shopping centre, opened in September 2007. It was the subject of considerable discussion with strong views for and against, because of its proximity to the Cathedral Close and Southernhay, and a design which integrated mixed housing into the Exeter retail zone, and resisted the late-20th-century drive towards bland malls.

Despite criticism, the site was developed by Land Securities in partnership with The Crown Estate into 530,000 sq ft of retail space accommodating over 60 stores. It won the British Council of Shopping Centres "Supreme Gold Award" in 2007, Retail Week's "Shopping location of the year" in 2008, and the International Council of Shopping Centers "Best Medium Sized Shopping Centre in Europe" in 2008.

The shopping centre had a CACI rating of 30 in 2011 which places it between Covent Garden and Derby in terms of its profitability. In 2011 it had an annual footfall of 9.5 million which attracted a potential spending of over £730 million.

Former anchor store Debenhams closed in 2021. The site remains vacant as of October 2024 along with many other large units in the development.

In October 2024, Frasers Group bought the shopping centre.

== Shops ==
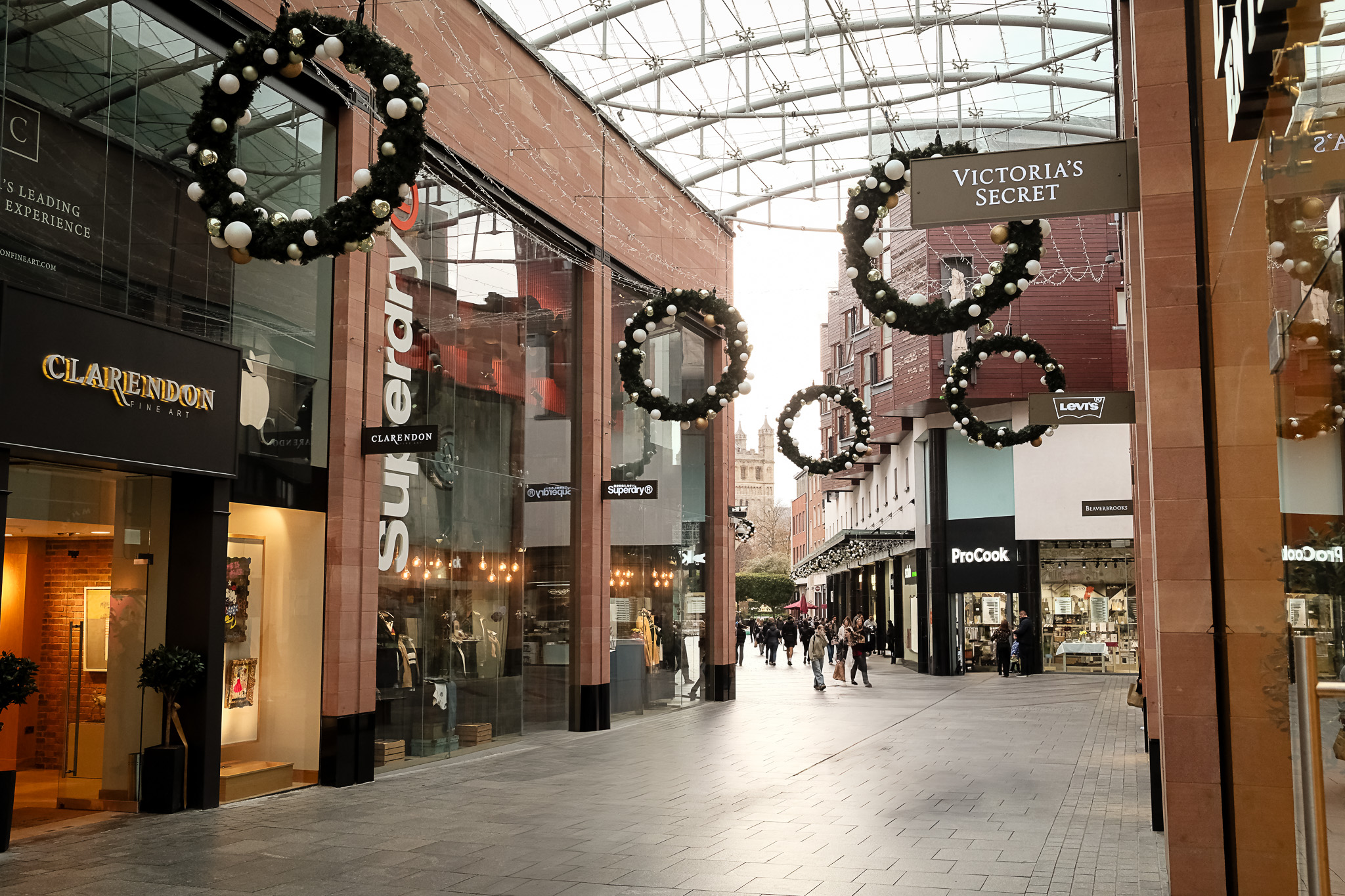
Princesshay shopping centre with Exeter Cathedral in the distance (2025)

Princesshay's largest stores are Next and FatFace along with other high street stores such as Apple Store, New Look, River Island, Zara, Tiger, Levi's, Hollister, Superdry, Lush, Build A Bear, Saks Hair and Beauty, Schuh, HMV, AllSaints.

Princesshay restaurants and cafes including Starbucks, Costa Coffee, Nandos, Chandos Deli, Wagamama, Coffee 1, Slim Chickens, YO! Sushi.

Princesshay is also home to Exeter's Underground Passages attraction, giving visitors a guided tour of the medieval subterranean passageways that used to transport water under the city centre. Dating back to the 14th century.

== Mobile device tracking ==
Princesshay has been criticised by visitors and consumer groups for its use of digital tracking technologies to provide near real-time location data of mobile phones within the complex. The system was provided by the retail metrics firm Path Intelligence in 2008, and gathers data by intercepting TMSI beacons from mobile phones. By using this aggregate data, the system creates a site plan displaying the location of switched on mobile phones, and their likely users.

== Attempted bombing ==
On 22 May 2008, the shopping centre was temporarily evacuated after a bomb was detonated in one of the restaurants injuring only the perpetrator. On 15 October 2008, Nicky Reilly admitted the attempted explosion.
