= Timeline of Bristol =

Coordinates: 51.45°N 2.583333°W

The following is a timeline of the history of the city of Bristol, England.

== Prior to 16th century ==
- 803 – St James' Priory founded.
- ca.1000 – A Saxon settlement began to grow up at the junction of the rivers Frome and Avon.
- 1009 – Market active.
- 12th C. – College Green created.
- 1129 – St James' Priory founded.
- 1140 – St Augustine's Abbey founded.
- 1141 – February: Stephen, King of England imprisoned in Bristol Castle after the Battle of Lincoln.
- 1147 – Bristol fair active.
- 1172 – Charter from Henry II.
- 13th C. – Society of Merchant Venturers formed.
- c.1220 – Bristol Cathedral construction begins.
- c.1223 – Grey friary founded.
- 1224 – Eleanor, Fair Maid of Brittany imprisoned in Bristol Castle under relatively comfortable conditions, almost to her death in 1241.
- c.1228 – Blackfriars Dominican priory established.
- 1290 – Jews expelled.
- 1292 – Church of St Mary Redcliffe built.
- 1295 – Parliamentary representation begins.
- 1373 – Bristol becomes a county corporate; Redcliffe becomes part of Bristol.
- 1470 – St Stephen's Church rebuilt.
- c.1478–1479 – Ricart's Maiores Kalendar of Bristol started.
- 1497 – May: Italian-born adventurer John Cabot sets sail on the ship Matthew looking for new lands to the west.
- 1498 – May: Cabot sets sail on his second voyage to the Americas; he is never heard of again.

== 16th–17th centuries ==
- 1504 – Chapel of the Three Kings of Cologne built.
- 1542 – See of Bristol established.
- 1552 – Society of Merchant Venturers chartered.
- 1580 – Red Lodge Museum established.
- 1595 – Merchant Venturers' School founded.
- 17th C. – The trade in African slaves flourishes.
- 1643 – July: Bristol in the English Civil War: Bristol taken by forces of Prince Rupert.
- 1644 – Fort at St. Michael's Hill rebuilt.
- 1645 – September: Bristol taken by forces of Cromwell.
- 1656 – Bristol Castle demolished.
- c. 1670 – King William Ale House built as a refuge for poor women.
- 1673 – James Millerd publishes his map of Bristol.
- 1691
  - Bristol Corporation of the Poor founded.
  - Almshouse established at St. Michael's Hill.

== 18th century ==
- 1701 – Merchants' hall built.
- 1702 – Bristol Post-Boy newspaper begins publication.
- 1710 – Colston's Hospital founded.
- 1708 – Unrest.
- 1709 – St James's Square laid out.
- 1712 – Custom House built.
- 1717 – William Cossley bookseller in business.
- 1725 – Farley's Bristol News-Paper begins publication.
- 1727 – Dowry Square laid out.
- 1729 – Walter Churchman patents his invention for making chocolate.
- 1737 – Bristol Royal Infirmary opens.
- 1738 – William Champion patents a process to distill zinc from calamine using charcoal in a smelter.
- 1739 – New Room (Methodist chapel) built.
- 1740 – Merchant Tailors' Guild Hall built.
- 1741 – King Square laid out.
- 1743 – The Exchange built.
- 1747 – Bristol becomes Britain's busiest slave trading port.
- 1753 – Economic unrest.
- c.1759 – Joseph Fry begins chocolate manufacture.
- 1766 – Theatre opens.
- 1767 – Bristol Gazette newspaper begins publication.
- 1768 – Bristol Bridge built.
- 1769 – St Nicholas Church rebuilt.
- 1770 – Bristol porcelain manufacture begins; Bristol blue glass is also first produced at about this date.
- 1773 – Bristol Library Society founded.
- 1779 – Stapleton Prison built to hold naval prisoners of war captured during the American Revolutionary War.
- 1786
  - Infirmary opens.
  - Wills, Watkins & Co. open a tobacconists' shop which becomes W.D. & H.O. Wills.
- 1788 – John Wesley gives speech against slavery.
- c.1790 – Berkeley Square laid out.
- 1791 – Christ Church with St Ewen and Equestrian Theatre built.
- 1793 – 30 September: Bridge riot.
- 1793–1813 – Stapleton prison used for French prisoners of war during the Napoleonic Wars.
- 1796 – John Harvey & Sons, importers of Harvey's Bristol Cream sherry, founded.
- 1799 – Pneumatic Institution established.

== 19th century ==
- 1803 – Bristol Dock Company incorporated.
- 1804 – Stapleton prison enlarged.
- 1809 – Bristol Harbour formed.
- 1810 – Commercial Rooms built.
- 1821
  - 13 April: John Horwood hanged at the New Gaol for the murder of Eliza Balsom.
  - 28 May: Population enumerated as 52,889.
- 1823
  - Chamber of Commerce founded.
  - Bristol Institution opens.
  - Bristol City Museum and Art Gallery established.
- 1830 – New cattle market opens.
- 1830s – Clifton becomes part of city.
- 1831 – October: Queen Square riots – 4 rioters killed and 86 injured by cavalry charge in Queen Square.
- 1832
  - 4 Queen Square rioters charged and hanged.
  - Bristol Mechanics' Institution building opens.
  - Holy Trinity Church built.
- 1836 – Zoological Gardens open.
- 1837 – Passage to St Vincent's Cave opens.
- 1838 – 8 April: Paddle steamer SS Great Western (launched 1837) begins her first voyage to the United States.
- 1840
  - 31 August: Bath–Bristol section of Great Western Railway begins operating and Bristol Temple Meads railway station opens.
  - Bristol and Clifton Ladies' Anti-Slavery Society instituted.
- 1841
  - 14 June: First section of Bristol and Exeter Railway opens to Bridgwater.
  - 30 June: Great Western Railway opens throughout between London and Bristol; Bristol Temple Meads railway station substantially complete.
- 1842
  - Synagogue opens in Park Row.
  - Buckingham Baptist Chapel built.
- 1843 – 19 July: Iron steamship SS Great Britain launched.
- 1844 – Bristol Academy for the Promotion of Fine Arts founded.
- 1847 – Horfield Barracks completed.
- 1850
  - Bristol, West of England and South Wales Permanent Building Society formed.
  - Pro-Cathedral of the Holy Apostles (Roman Catholic) consecrated.
  - Clifton Victoria Baths opened.
- 1858
  - Western Daily Press newspaper begins publication.
  - Bristol General Hospital opens.
- 1861 – Durdham Down and Clifton Down rights acquired.
- 1862
  - Bristol Naturalists' Society established.
  - Clifton College opens.
- 1864
  - Clifton Suspension Bridge opens.
  - Avonside Engine Company in business.
- 1865
  - Bristol and West of England Amateur Photographic Association formed.
  - Industrial Exhibition held.
  - Daily Bristol Times and Mirror newspaper in publication.
- 1867 – Bristol Beacon concert hall opens as Colston Hall.
- 1870 – Gloucestershire County Cricket Club formed. On 2–4 June, it plays its first first-class match, on Durdham Down.
- 1871 – Bristol Museum and Library established.
- 1872 – Bristol Harbour Railway opened.
- 1873 – Bristol Trades Council founded.
- 1875 – Bristol Tramways (horse-drawn) begin operation.
- 1876
  - University College, Bristol opens.
  - The Bristol and Gloucestershire Archaeological Society founded.
- 1877 – Avonmouth dock opens.
- 1884 – Clifton Antiquarian Club founded.
- 1887
  - 1 October: Bristol Tramways and Carriage Company formed by merger of the Bristol Tramways Company and the Bristol Cab Company and begins a horse-drawn omnibus service to Clifton.
  - Bristol Camera Society established.
  - Bristol Home for Lost and Starving Dogs opens.
- 1889
  - Labour strike.
  - Bristol Choral Society founded.
  - March: Flood.
- 1892 – Labour strike.
- 1893 – Brazil, Straker & Co (motor vehicle manufacturers) in business.
- 1895 – Bristol Tramways begin operating with electric traction.
- 1898 – Cabot Tower built on Brandon Hill.
- 1899 – The chief magistrate becomes a lord mayor.

== 20th century ==
- 1901
  - Imperial Direct West India Mail Service begins operating to Jamaica.
  - Population: 328,945.
  - Area of city: 11,705 acres.
- 1904
  - Shirehampton becomes part of city.
  - Area of city: 17,004 acres.
- 1905 – Bristol Kyrle Society founded, a constituent of Bristol Civic Society.
- 1906
  - January: Bristol Tramways and Carriage Company introduces its first motor buses.
  - 4 October: Great Western Railway opens Bristol Harbour Extension Railway and Canon's Marsh goods branch.
  - Bristol Central Library opened.
- 1908 – Royal Edward Dock opens at Avonmouth.
- 1909 – University of Bristol receives royal charter.
- 1910 – British and Colonial Aeroplane Company in business.
- 1912 – Bristol Hippodrome opens.
- 1914 – 29 June: International Exhibition opens at the "White City", Ashton Gate, becoming a military depot soon after the outbreak of war.
- 1916
  - August: First tanks shipped to France from Avonmouth.
  - 9 September: Bristol F.2 Fighter aircraft first flies.
- 1926 – Hanham Colliery closes.
- 1929 – Bristol Record Society founded.
- 1930 – Whitchurch Airport begins operating.
- 1932
  - 23 February: Old Market riot.
  - 7 March: Bristol Evening Post newspaper begins publication.
- 1933
  - Gaiety Cinema opens.
  - Ribena first manufactured, by H. W. Carter.
- 1934 – 18 September: BBC Bristol Studios open.
- 1938 – Ritz Cinema opens.
- 1940 – 2 November: Bristol Blitz (aerial bombing by German forces) begins.
- 1941 – 11 April: Bristol Tramways abandoned due to bomb damage to its electric power supply.
- 1944 – 15 May: Bristol Blitz ends.
- 1945 – Bristol Cars in business.
- 1946 – Bristol Old Vic theatre company and Bristol Old Vic Theatre School established.
- 1956 – 17 April: Chew Valley Lake (1,200 acres (4.9 km^{2})) in Somerset is inaugurated as a reservoir for the Bristol area by the Queen.
- 1957 – Bristol Airport opens.
- 1958 – Bristol bus station opens.
- 1959 – Bristol Siddeley aero engine manufacturer in business.
- 1963 – 30 April: Bristol Bus Boycott.
- 1968 – World Professional Billiards and Snooker Association headquartered in city.
- 1969 – 9 April: British prototype Concorde airliner first flies from Filton.
- 1970
  - 5 July: SS Great Britain returns to Bristol.
  - 4 September: BBC Radio Bristol begins broadcasting.
  - Purdown BT Tower, for telecommunications and a radio repeater, is built.
  - Bristol Polytechnic established from Merchant Venturers Technical College.
- 1972 – 1 May: Bristol Parkway railway station opens.
- 1973 – 29 June: Clifton Cathedral (Roman Catholic) consecrated.
- 1974
  - 1 April: Bristol becomes part of the county of Avon
  - May: Avonmouth Bridge opens in Shirehampton.
  - c. July: Ashton Court Festival begins.
- 1977 – Gay Pride begins.
- 1978
  - Royal Portbury Dock opens.
  - Castle Park laid out.
  - Bristol Gay Centre founded.
- 1980 – 2 April: St. Pauls riot.
- 1984
  - 1 May: Old Profanity Showboat opens.
  - Bristol Community Church organised.
- 1986 – Show of Strength Theatre Company formed.
- 1991 – 27 January: Following its purchase by the Chiltern Radio Group, Bristol station FTP is replaced by Galaxy Radio.
- 1992
  - 16 July: Hartcliffe riot.
  - University of the West of England granted university status.
- 1996
  - 1 April: County of Avon abolished; Bristol once again becomes both a city and a county.
  - 24–27 May: First International Festival of the Sea held in and around the Harbour; replica 15th-century ship Matthew dedicated.
  - 19 July: MoD Abbey Wood opened at Filton.
  - City of Bristol College established by merger of Brunel College and South Bristol College.
- 1998 – Tobacco Factory Theatre established.
- 2000 – Shakespeare at the Tobacco Factory theatre company founded.

== 21st century ==
- 2001 – Bristol Royal Hospital for Children building opens.
- 2003 – Plain Clothes Theatre Productions formed.
- 2004 – Bristol Shakespeare Festival begins.
- 2006 – Redland Green School built.
- 2007 – 26–27 May: Dot to Dot Festival first held in Bristol.
- 2009 – The Bottle Yard Studios open as a television and film production facility.
- 2010 – Brunel Institute opens.
- 2011
  - 21 April: Stokes Croft riot, including an attack on a locally controversial newly opened Tesco store.
  - Bristol becomes a "city of sanctuary" for refugees.
- 2012 – 19 November: Architect George Ferguson takes office as the first elected Mayor of Bristol.
- 2020
  - 10 February: Councillors reject a proposed expansion of Bristol Airport, by 18 votes to seven, on the grounds that it would exacerbate climate change, damage the health of local people, and harm flora and fauna.
  - 7 June: The 1895 statue of Edward Colston, a 17th-century merchant, slave trader, MP and philanthropist, is pulled down by anti-racism protesters.
  - 2 December: COVID-19 pandemic in the United Kingdom: Bristol enters Tier 3, the strictest level of restriction.
  - 3 December: An explosion at a waste water treatment works in Avonmouth kills 4.
- 2022 – 4 September: Bristol Zoo closes at its Clifton site.
- 2027 – Projected: Gloucestershire County Cricket Club plays its T20 Blast matches under the name 'Bristol'.

== See also ==
- History of Bristol
- Timelines of other cities in South West England: Bath, Exeter, Plymouth
