= History of Bristol =

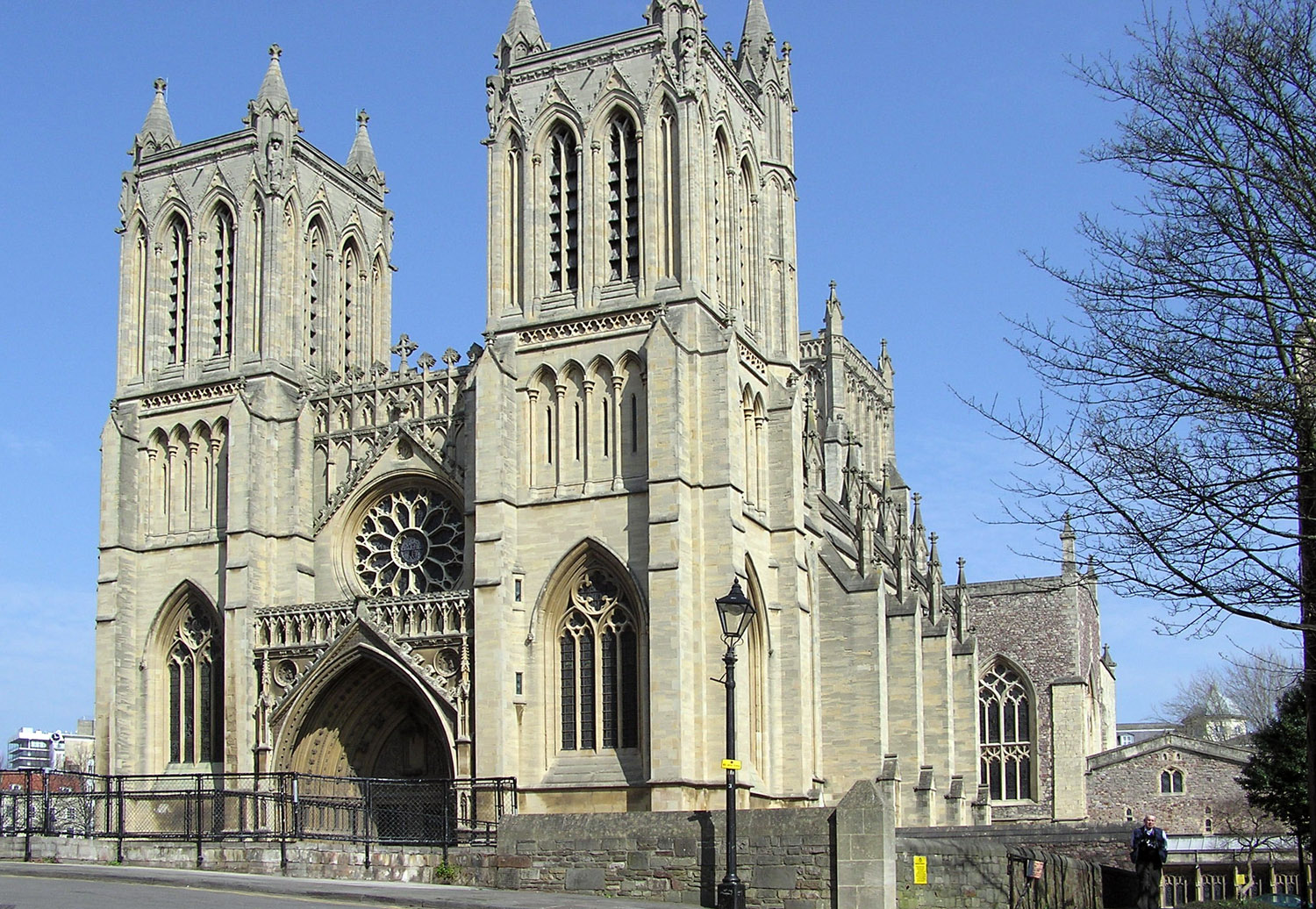
The west front of Bristol Cathedral

Bristol is a city with a population of nearly half a million people in south west England, situated between Somerset and Gloucestershire on the tidal River Avon. It has been among the country's largest and most economically and culturally important cities for eight centuries. The Bristol area has been settled since the Stone Age and there is evidence of Roman occupation. A mint was established in the Saxon burgh of Brycgstow by the 10th century and the town rose to prominence in the Norman era, gaining a charter and county status in 1373. The change in the form of the name 'Bristol' is due to the local pronunciation of 'ow' as 'ol'.

Maritime connections to Wales, Ireland, Iceland, western France, Spain and Portugal brought a steady increase in trade in wool, fish, wine and grain during the Middle Ages. Bristol became a city in 1542 and trade across the Atlantic developed. The city was captured by Royalist troops and then recaptured for Parliament during the English Civil War. During the 17th and 18th centuries the transatlantic slave trade and the Industrial Revolution brought further prosperity. Edmund Burke, MP for Bristol, supported the American Revolution and free trade. Prominent reformers such as Mary Carpenter and Hannah More campaigned against the slave trade.

The late 18th and early 19th centuries saw the construction of a floating harbour, advances in shipbuilding and further industrialisation with the growth of the glass, paper, soap and chemical industries aided by the establishment of Bristol as the terminus of the Great Western Railway by I. K. Brunel. In the early 20th century, Bristol was in the forefront of aircraft manufacture and the city had become an important financial centre and high technology hub by the beginning of the 21st century.

== Pre-Norman ==
=== Palaeolithic and Iron Age ===
There is evidence of settlement in the Bristol area from the palaeolithic era, with 60,000-year-old archaeological finds at Shirehampton and St Annes. Stone tools made from flint, chert, sandstone and quartzite have been found in terraces of the River Avon, most notably in the neighbourhoods of Shirehampton and Pill. There are Iron Age hill forts near the city, at Leigh Woods and Clifton Down on either side of the Avon Gorge, and at Kingsweston, near Henbury. Bristol was at that time part of the territory of the Dobunni. Evidence of Iron Age farmsteads has been found at excavations throughout Bristol, including a settlement at Filwood. There are also indications of seasonal occupation of the salt marshes at Hallen on the Severn estuary.

=== Roman era ===
During the Roman era there was a settlement named Abona at the present Sea Mills; this was important enough to feature in the 3rd-century Antonine Itinerary which documents towns and distances in the Roman empire, and was connected to Bath by a road. Archaeological excavations at Abona have found a street pattern, shops, cemeteries and wharves, indicating that the town served as a port. Another settlement at what is now Inns Court, Filwood, had possibly developed from earlier Iron Age farmsteads. There were also isolated villas and small settlements throughout the area, notably Kings Weston Roman Villa and another at Brislington.

=== Saxon era ===
A minster was founded in the 8th century at Westbury on Trym and is mentioned in a charter of 804. In 946 an outlaw named Leof killed Edmund I in a brawl at a feast in the royal palace at Pucklechurch, which lies about six miles from Bristol. The town of Bristol was founded on a low hill between the rivers Frome and Avon at some time before the early 11th century. The main evidence for this is a coin of Aethelred issued c. 1010. This shows that the settlement must have been a market town and the name Brycg stowe indicates "place by the bridge". It is believed that the Bristol L (the tendency for the local accent to add a letter L to the end of some words) is what changed the name Brycg stowe to the current name Bristol.

It appears that St Peter's church, the remains of which stand in modern Castle Park, may have been another minster, possibly with 8th-century origins. By the time of Domesday the church held three hides of land, which was a sizeable holding for a mere parish church. The Anglo-Saxon Chronicle records that in 1052 Harold Godwinson took ship to Brycgstow and later in 1062 he took ships from the town to subdue the forces of Gruffydd ap Llywelyn of Wales, indicating the status of the town as a port.

Brycg stowe was a major centre for the Anglo-Saxon slave trade. Men, women and children captured in Wales or northern England were traded through Bristol to Dublin as slaves. From there the Viking rulers of Dublin would sell them on throughout the known world. The Saxon bishop of Worcester, Wulfstan, whose diocese included Bristol, preached against the trade regularly and eventually it was forbidden by the crown, though it carried on in secret for many years.

== Middle Ages ==
=== Norman era ===
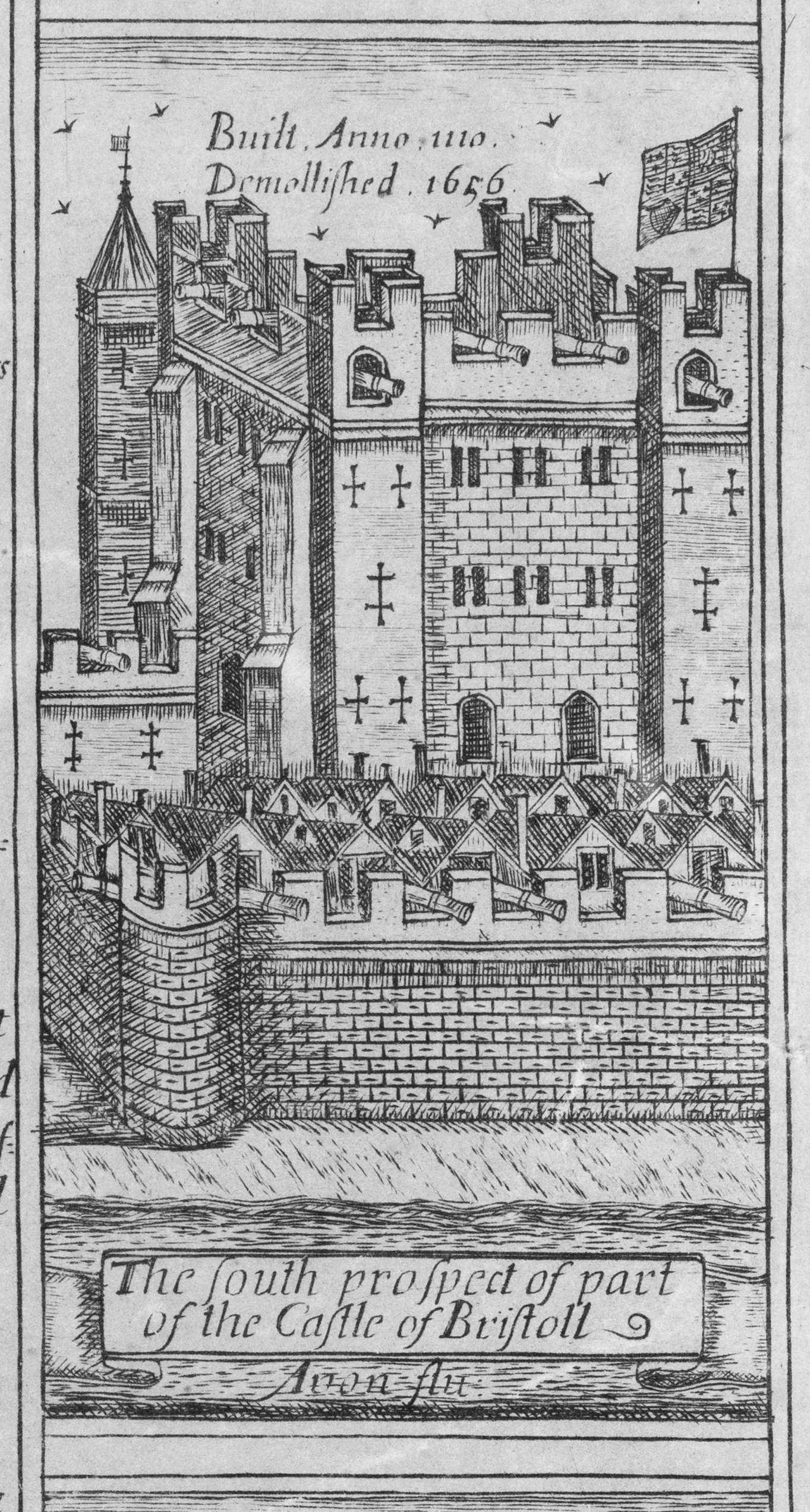
Bristol Castle, as depicted on James Millerd's 1673 map of Bristol

At some time after the Norman conquest of England in 1066 a motte-and-bailey was erected on the present site of Castle Park. Bristol was held by Geoffrey de Montbray, Bishop of Countances, one of the knights who accompanied William the Conqueror. William ordered stone castles to be built so it is likely that the first parts of Bristol Castle were built by Geoffrey in his reign. After the Conqueror's death (1087), Geoffrey joined the rebellion against William Rufus. Using Bristol as his headquarters, he burned Bath and ravaged Somerset before submitting to Rufus. He eventually returned to Normandy and died at Coutances in 1093.

Rufus created the Honour of Gloucester, which included Bristol, from his mother Queen Matilda's estates and granted it to Robert Fitzhamon. Fitzhamon enlarged and strengthened Bristol castle and in the latter years of the 11th century conquered and subdued much of south and west Wales. His daughter Mabel was married in 1114 to Henry I's bastard son Robert of Caen. Her dowry was a large part of her father's Gloucestershire and Welsh estate and Robert of Caen became the first Earl of Gloucester, c. 1122. He is believed to have been responsible for completing Bristol castle.

In 1135 Henry I died and the Earl of Gloucester rallied to the support of his sister Matilda against Stephen of Blois who had seized the throne on Henry's death. Stephen attempted to lay siege to Robert at Bristol in 1138 but gave up the attempt as the castle appeared impregnable. When Stephen was captured in 1141 he was imprisoned in the castle, but when Robert was captured by Stephen's forces, Matilda was forced to exchange Stephen for Robert. Her son Henry, later to become Henry II of England, was kept safe in the castle, guarded and educated by his uncle Robert. The castle was later taken into royal hands, and Henry III spent lavishly on it, adding a barbican before the main west gate, a gate tower, and magnificent hall. The castle was also used to imprison Eleanor, Fair Maid of Brittany from 1224, under relatively comfortable conditions, almost to her death in 1241.

The Earl of Gloucester had founded the Benedictine priory of St James in 1137. In 1140 St Augustine's Abbey was founded by Robert Fitzharding, a wealthy Bristolian who had loyally supported the Earl and Matilda in the war. As a reward for this support he would later be made Lord of Berkeley. The abbey was a monastery of Augustinian canons. In 1148 the abbey church was dedicated by the bishops of Exeter, Llandaff, and St. Asaph, and during Fitzharding's lifetime the abbey also built the chapter house and gatehouse.

In 1172, following the subjugation of the Pale in Ireland, Henry II gave Bristolians the right to reside in and trade from Dublin.

The medieval Jewish community of Bristol was one of the smaller communities in England. The Jews of Bristol were accused in a blood libel in 1183, but not many details are known. At the end of the 12th century, an archa was established in the city, without which Jews would not have been legally allowed to conduct business. In 1210, all Jewish householders in England were imprisoned in Bristol and a hefty levy of 60,000 or 66,000 marks was imposed on them. During the Second Barons' War, the city's archa was burned and the Jewish community was violently attacked. There was another attack in 1275, but without fatalities. The community was expelled with the rest of England's Jews in 1290. There is a surviving Jewish ritual bath, from this time period now known as Jacob's Well. First interpreted as a mikveh, this was subsequently re-evaluated as a Bet Tohorah, associated with the nearby Jewish cemetery at Jews Acre.

=== Later Middle Ages ===
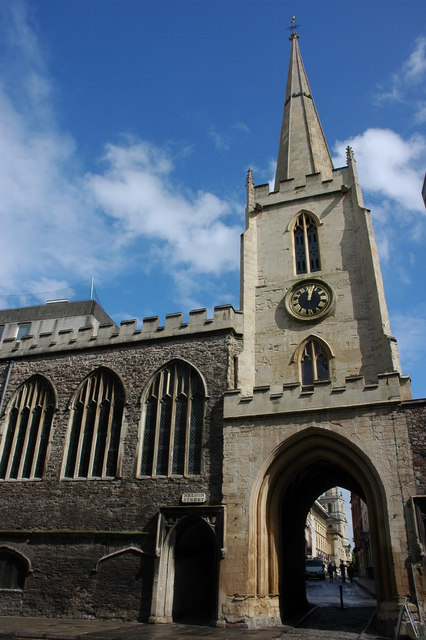
Church of St John the Baptist with the tower over the city gateway

By the 13th century Bristol had become a busy port. Woollen cloth became its main export during the fourteenth to fifteenth century, while wine from Gascony and Bordeaux, was the principal import. In addition the town conducted an extensive trade with the Anglo-Irish ports of southern Ireland, such as Waterford and Cork, as well as with Portugal. From about 1420–1480 the port also traded with Iceland, from which it imported a type of freeze-dried cod called 'stockfish'.

In 1147 Bristol men and ships had assisted in the siege of Lisbon, which led to that city's recapture from the Moors. A stone bridge was built across the Avon, c. 1247 and between the years of 1240 and 1247 a Great Ditch was constructed in St Augustine's Marsh to straighten out the course of the River Frome and provide more space for berthing ships.

Redcliffe and Bedminster were incorporated into the city in 1373. Edward III proclaimed "that the town of Bristol with its suburbs and precincts shall henceforth be separate from the counties of Gloucester and Somerset and be in all things exempt both by land by sea, and that it should be a county by itself, to be called the county of Bristol in perpetuity." This meant that disputes could be settled in courts in Bristol rather than at Gloucester, or at Ilminster for areas south of the Avon which had been part of Somerset. The city walls extended into Redcliffe and across the eastern part of the march which now became the Town Marsh. The major surviving part of the walls is visible adjacent to the only remaining gateway under the tower of the Church of St John the Baptist.

By the mid-14th century Bristol is considered to have been England's third-largest town (after London and York), with an estimated 15–20,000 inhabitants on the eve of the Black Death of 1348–49. The plague inflicted a prolonged demographic setback, with the population estimated at between 10,000 and 12,000 during the 15th and 16th centuries.

One of the first great merchants of Bristol was William Canynge. Born c. 1399, he was five times mayor of the town and twice represented it as an MP. He is said to have owned ten ships and employed over 800 sailors. In later life he became a priest and spent a considerable part of his fortune in rebuilding St Mary Redcliffe church, which had been severely damaged by lightning in 1446.

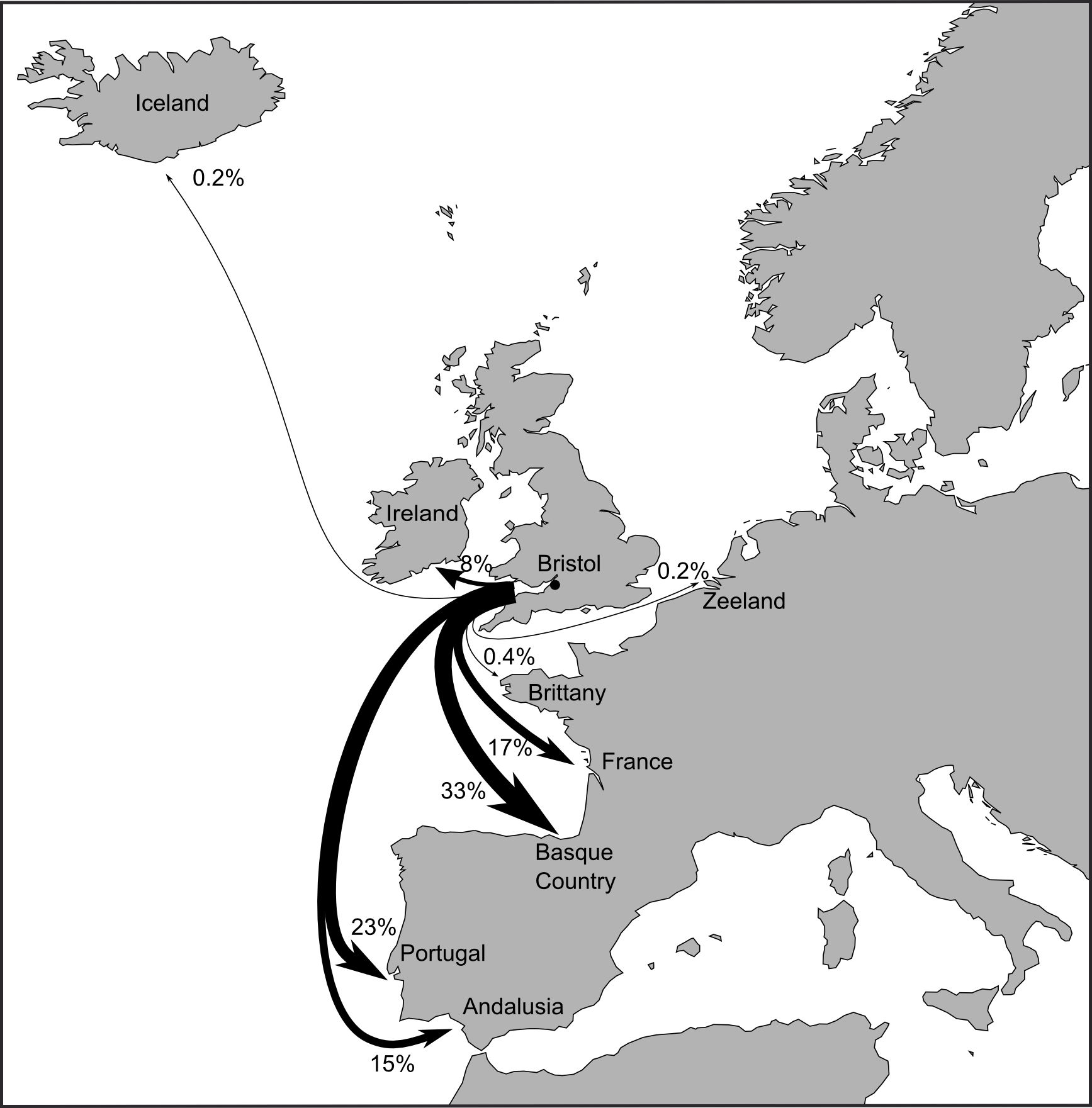
Bristol's overseas trade as recorded in 1492/3 customs accounts.

The end of the Hundred Years War in 1453 meant that Britain, and thus Bristol, lost its access to Gascon wines and so imports of Spanish and Portuguese wines increased. Imports from Ireland included fish, hides and cloth (probably linen). Exports to Ireland included broadcloth, foodstuffs, clothing and metals.

It has been suggested that the decline of Bristol's Iceland trade for 'stockfish' (freeze dried cod) was a hard blow to the local economy, encouraging Bristol merchants to turn west, launching unsuccessful voyages of exploration in the Atlantic by 1480 in search of the phantom island of Hy-Brazil. More recent research, however, has shown that the Iceland trade was never more than a minor part of Bristol's overseas trade and that the English fisheries off Iceland actually increased during the late 15th and 16th centuries. In 1487, when king Henry VII visited the city, the inhabitants complained about their economic decline. Such complaints, however, were not uncommon among corporations that wished to avoid paying taxes, or which hoped to secure concessions from the Crown. In reality, Bristol's customs accounts show that the port's trade was growing strongly during the last two decades of the fifteenth century. In great part this was due to the increase of trade with Spain.

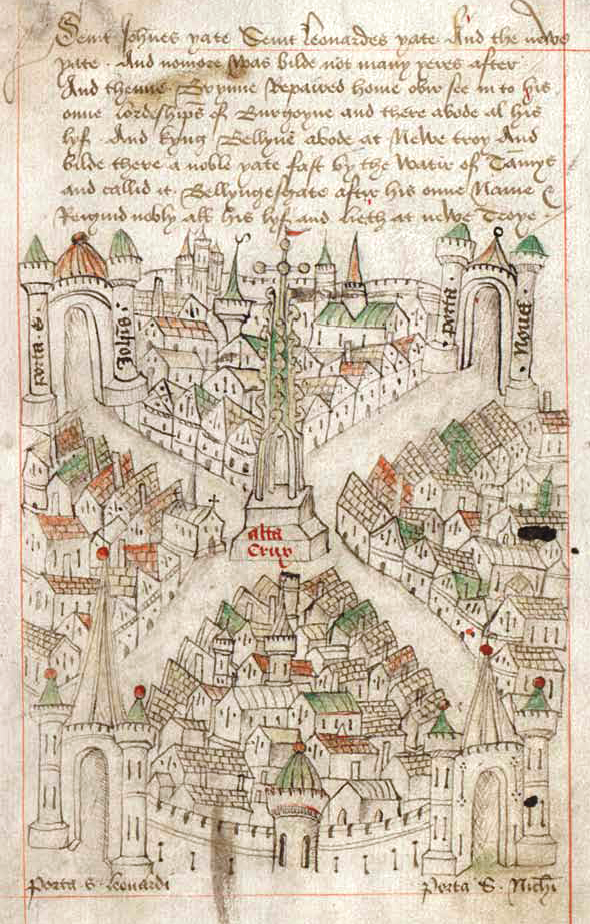
The map of Bristol in The Maire of Bristowe is Kalendar. This was drawn by Robert Ricart after he became the common clerk of the town in 1478. His drawing was the first such plan of an English town.

=== Exploration ===
In 1497 Bristol was the starting point for John Cabot's voyage of exploration to North America. For many years Bristol merchants had bought freeze-dried cod, called stockfish, from Iceland for consumption in England. However, the Hanseatic League, which was trying to control North Atlantic trade at this time, sought to cut off supplies to English merchants. It has often been suggested that this drove Bristol's merchants to look West for new sources of cod fish. On the other hand, while Bristol merchants did largely abandon Iceland in the late-15th century, Hull merchants continued to trade there. Moreover, recent research has shown that England's fisheries off Iceland actually grew significantly from the 1490s, albeit the centre for this activity shifted from Bristol to East Anglia. This makes it hard to sustain the argument that Bristol merchants were somehow 'pushed out' of Iceland.

In 1481 two local men, Thomas Croft and John Jay, sent off ships looking for the mythical island of Hy-Brasil. There was no mention of the island being discovered but Croft was prosecuted for illegal exports of salt, on the grounds that, as a customs officer, he should not have engaged in trade. Professor David Beers Quinn, whose theories form the basis for a variety of popular histories, suggested that the explorers may have discovered the Grand Banks off Newfoundland, waters rich in cod.

John Cabot was sponsored by Henry VII on his voyage in 1497, looking for a new route to the Orient. Having discovered North America instead, on his return Cabot spoke of the great quantities of cod to be found near the new land. In 1498 Cabot set sail again from Bristol with an expedition of five ships and is believed to have never returned from this voyage, although recent research conducted at the University of Bristol, suggests that he might have.

From 1499 to 1508 a number of other expeditions were launched from Bristol to the 'New found land', the earliest being undertaken by William Weston. One of these, led by John Cabot's son, Sebastian Cabot, explored down the coast of North America until he was 'almost in the latitude of Gibraltar' and 'almost the longitude of Cuba'. This would suggest that he reached as far as the Chesapeake, close to what is now Washington D.C.

== Early modern ==
=== Tudor and Stuart periods ===
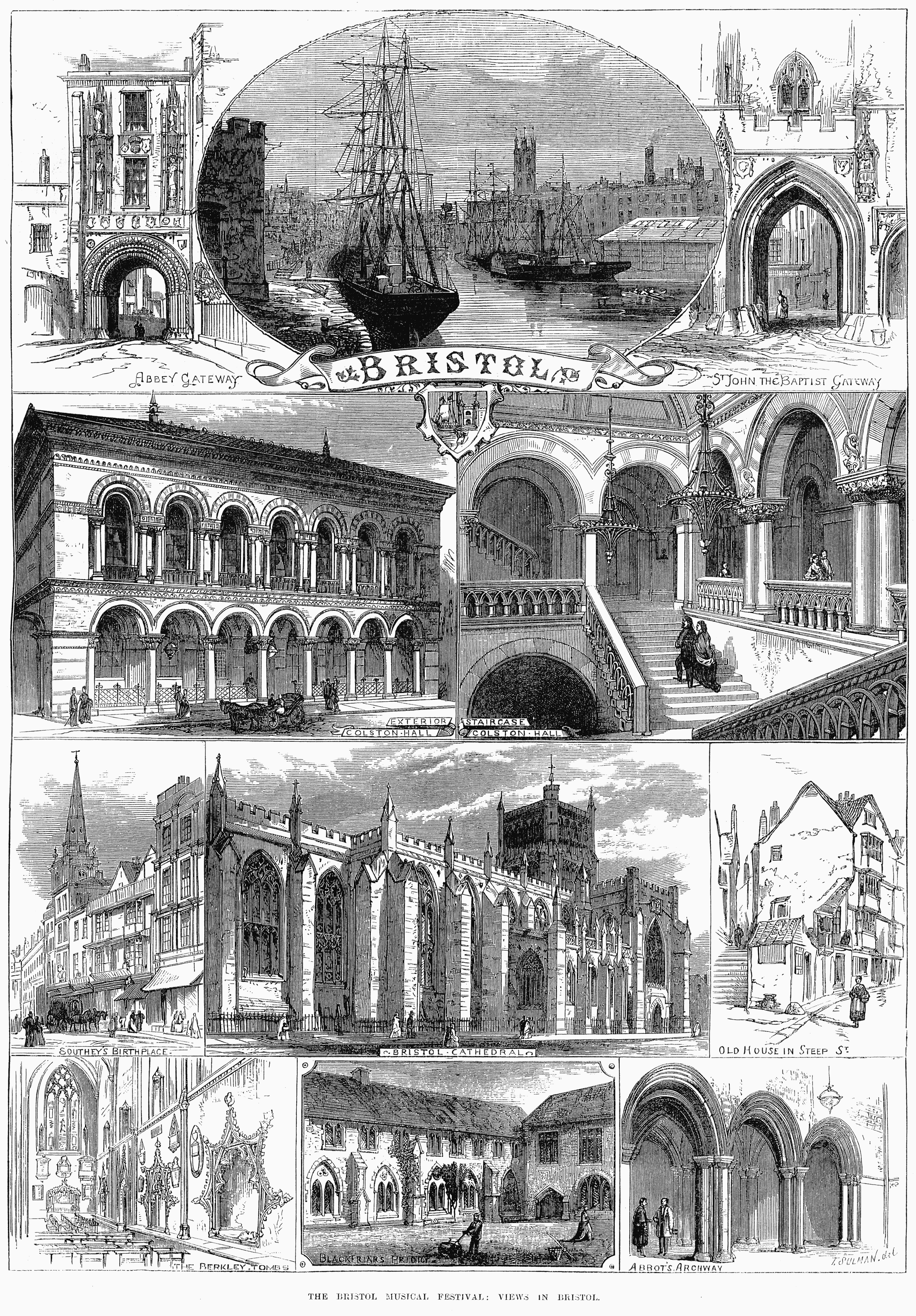
Views around Bristol in 1873

Bristol was made a city in 1542, with the former Abbey of St Augustine becoming Bristol Cathedral, following the Dissolution of the Monasteries by Henry VIII. The Dissolution also saw the surrender to the king of all of Bristol's friaries and monastic hospitals, together with St James' Priory, St Mary Magdalen nunnery and the college at Westbury on Trym. In the case of the friaries at Greyfriars and Whitefriars, the priors had fled before the arrival of the royal commissioners, and at Whitefriars a succession of departing priors had plundered the friary of its valuables. Although the commissioners had not been able to point to as much religious malpractice in Bristol as elsewhere, there is no record of Bristolians raising any objections to the royal seizures. In 1541 Bristol's civic leaders took the opportunity of buying up lands and properties formerly belonging to St Mark's Hospital, St Mary Magdalen, Greyfriars and Whitefriars for a total of a thousand pounds. Bristol thereby became the only municipality in the country which has its own chapel, at St Mark's.

Bristol Grammar School was established in 1532 by the Thorne family and in 1596 John Carr established Queen Elizabeth's Hospital, a bluecoat school charged with 'the education of poor children and orphans'.

Trade continued to grow: by the mid-16th century imports from Europe included, wine, olive oil, iron, figs and other dried fruits and dyes; exports included cloth (both cotton and wool), lead and hides. Many of the city's leading merchants were involved in smuggling at this time, illicitly exporting goods like foodstuffs and leather, while under-declaring imports of wine.

In 1574 Elizabeth I visited the city during her Royal Progress through the western counties. The city burgesses spent over one thousand pounds on preparations and entertainments, most of which was raised by special rate assessments. In 1577 the explorer Martin Frobisher arrived in the city with two ships and samples of ore, which proved to be worthless. He also brought, according to Latimer "three savages, doubtless Esqiumaux, clothed in deerskins, but all of them died within a month of their arrival."

Bristol sent three ships to the Royal Navy fleet against the Spanish Armada in 1588, and also supplied two levies of men to the defending land forces. Despite appeals to the Privy Council no reimbursement was made for these supplies. The corporation also had to repair the walls and gates of the city. The castle had fallen into disuse in the late Tudor era, but the City authorities had no control over royal property and the precincts became a refuge for lawbreakers.

Anne of Denmark came to Bristol in June 1613 and was welcomed by the mayor Abel Kitchin. The visit featured a pageant on the river, with an English ship attacked by Turkish galleys, which the queen watched from the Canon's Marsh meadow near the cathedral. An English victory was signalled by the release of six bladders of pig's blood poured out of the ship's scupper holes.

=== English Civil War ===
In 1630 the city corporation bought the castle and when the First English Civil War broke out in 1642, the city took the Parliamentary side and partly restored the fortifications. However, Royalist troops under the command of Prince Rupert captured Bristol on 26 July 1643, in the process causing extensive damage to both town and castle. The Royalist forces captured large amounts of booty and also eight armed merchant vessels which became the nucleus of the Royalist fleet. Workshops in the city became arms factories, providing muskets for the Royalist army.

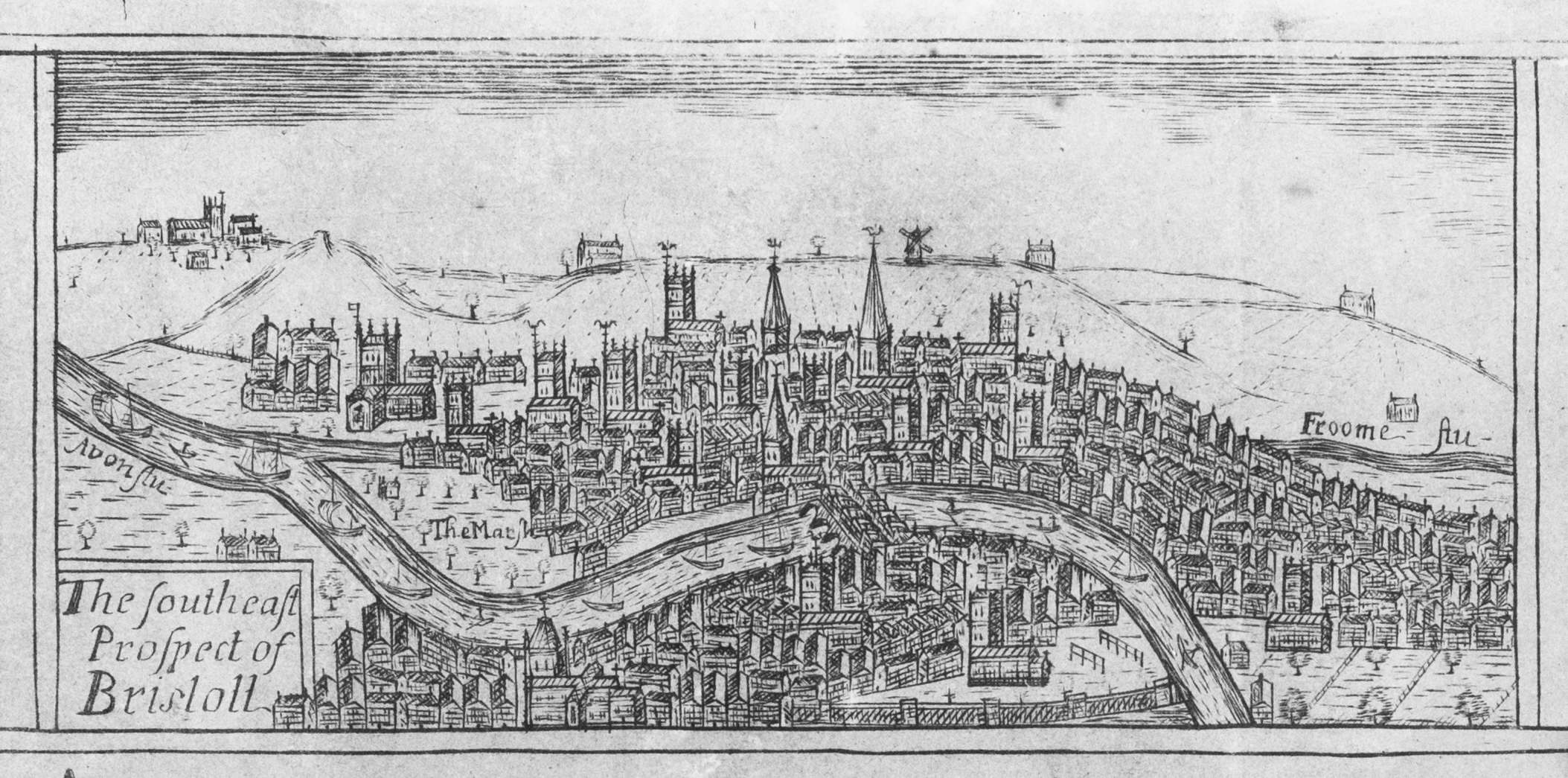
Southeast Prospect of Bristoll in 1673

In the summer of 1645, Royalist forces were defeated by the New Model Army at the Battle of Langport, in Somerset. Following further victories at Bridgwater and Sherborne, Sir Thomas Fairfax marched on Bristol. Prince Rupert returned to organise the defence of the city. The Parliamentary forces besieged the city and after three weeks attacked, eventually forcing Rupert to surrender on 10 September. The First Civil War ended the following year. There were no further military actions in Bristol during the second and third civil wars. In 1656, Oliver Cromwell ordered the destruction of the castle.

=== Slave trade ===
William de la Founte, a wealthy Bristol merchant has been identified as the first recorded English slave traders. Of Gascon origin, in 1480 he was one of the four venturers granted a licence "to trade in any parts". Renewed growth came with the 17th-century rise of England's American colonies and the rapid 18th-century expansion of Bristol's part in the "Triangular trade" in Africans taken for slavery in the Americas. Over 2000 slaving voyages were made by Bristol ships between the late 17th century and abolition in 1807, carrying an estimated half a million people from Africa to the Americas in brutal conditions. Average profits per voyage were seventy per cent and more than fifteen per cent of the Africans transported died or were murdered on the Middle Passage. Some slaves were brought to Bristol, from the Caribbean; notable among these were Scipio Africanus, buried at Henbury and Pero Jones brought to Bristol by slave trader and plantation owner John Pinney.

The slave trade and the consequent demand for cheap brass ware for export to Africa caused a boom in the copper and brass manufacturing industries of the Avon valley, which in turn encouraged the progress of the Industrial Revolution in the area. Prominent manufacturers such as Abraham Darby and William Champion developed extensive works between Conham and Keynsham which used ores from the Mendips and coal from the North Somerset coalfield. Water power from tributaries of the Avon drove the hammers in the brass batteries, until the development of steam power in the later 18th century. Glass, soap, sugar, paper and chemical industries also developed along the Avon valley.

Edmund Burke was elected as Whig Member of Parliament for Bristol in 1774 and campaigned for free trade, Catholic emancipation and the rights of the American colonists, but he angered his merchant sponsors with his detestation of the slave trade and lost the seat in 1780.

Anti-slavery campaigners, inspired by Non-conformist preachers such as John Wesley, started some of the earliest campaigns against the practice. Prominent local opponents of both the trade and the institution of slavery itself included Anne Yearsley, Hannah More, Harry Gandey, Mary Carpenter, Robert Southey, William Wordsworth and Samuel Coleridge. The campaign itself proved to be the beginning of movements for reform and women's emancipation.

== 18th and 19th centuries ==
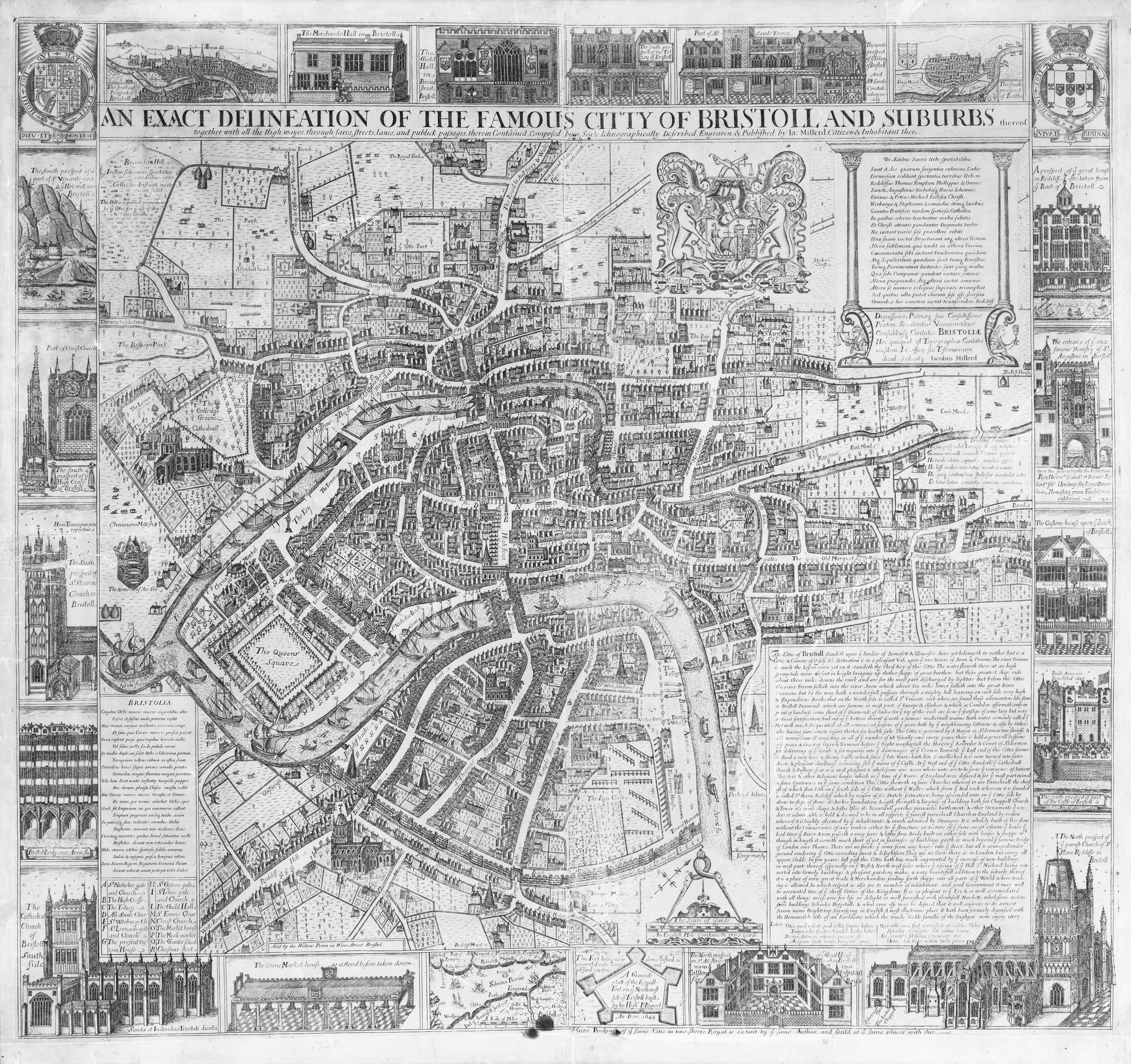
The 1728 version of James Millerd's map of Bristol, originally published in 1671

The Bristol Corporation of the Poor was established in 1696 and a workhouse, to provide work for the poor and shelter for those needing charity, was established, adjacent to the Bridewell. John Wesley founded the very first Methodist Chapel, The New Room in Broadmead in 1739, which is still in use in the 21st century. Wesley had come to Bristol at the invitation of George Whitfield. He preached in the open air to miners and brickworkers in Kingswood and Hanham. Kingswood is the site of a recent archaeological excavation (2014) which uncovered the diversity of artisans living in the area at the time.

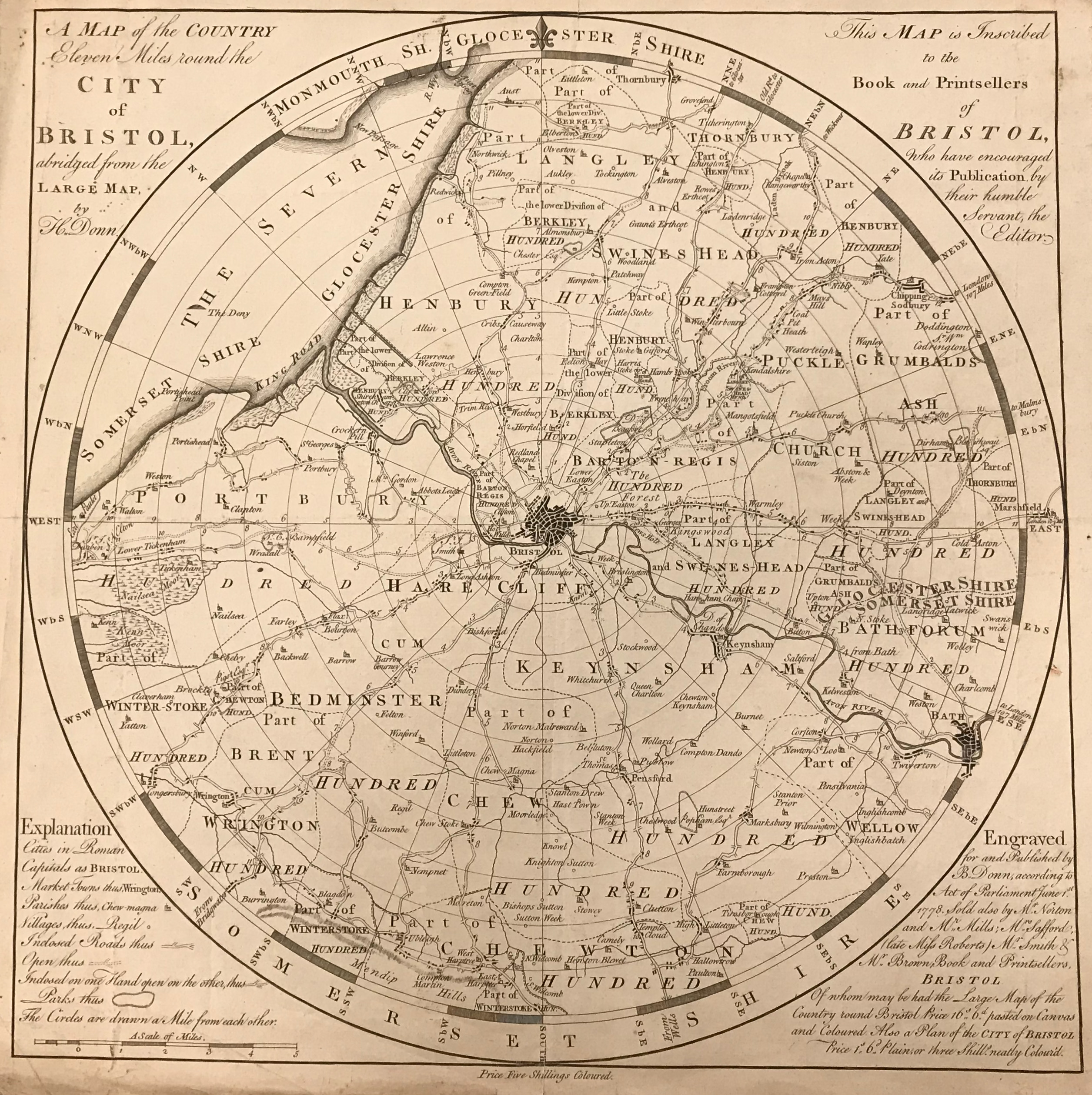
18th-century map of the city and region around Bristol, England.

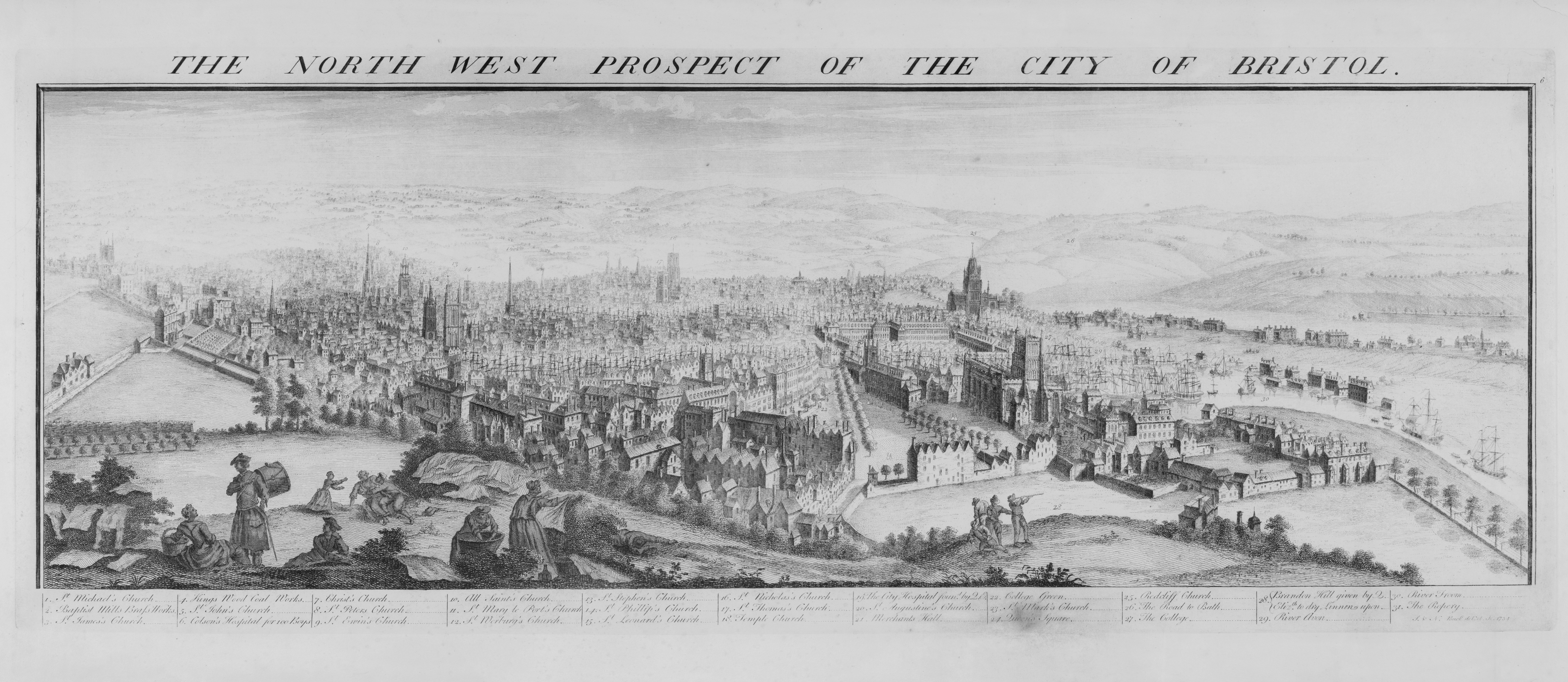
NW Prospect of Bristol, 1734

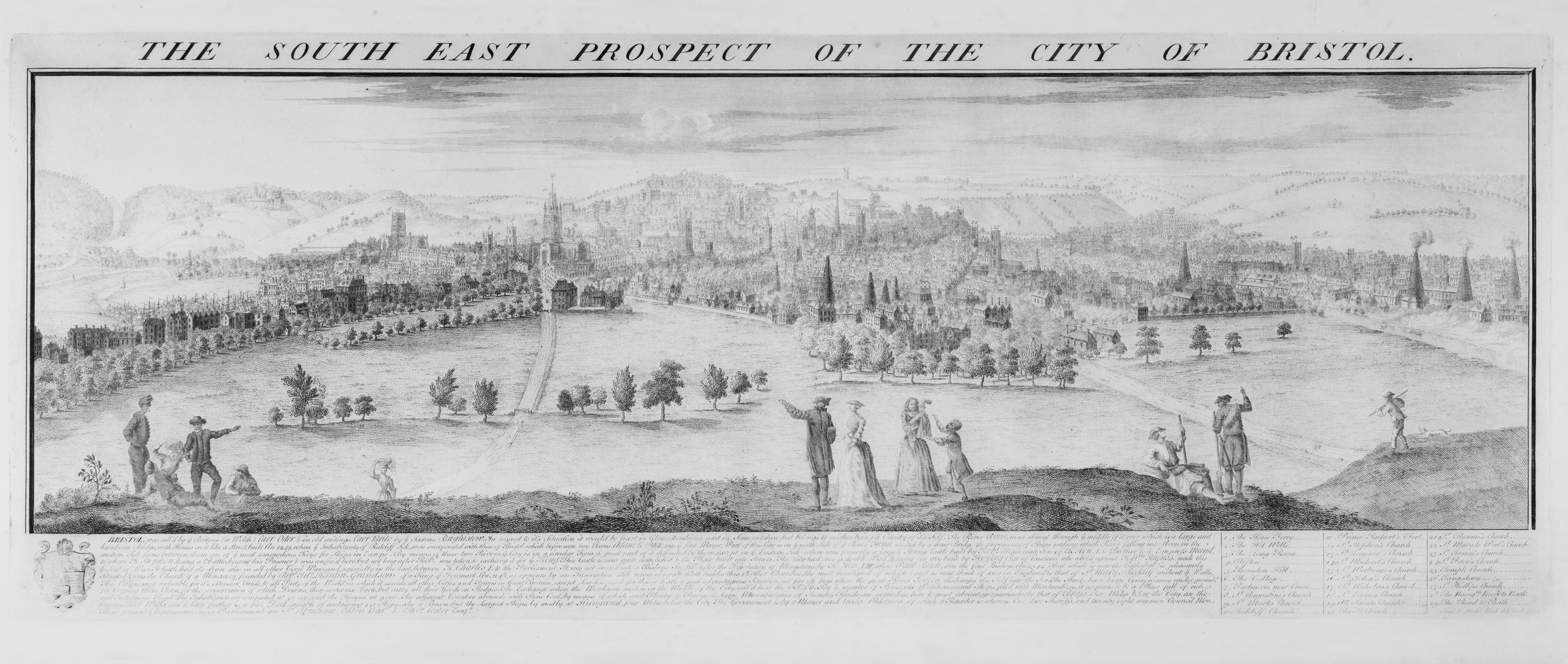
SE Prospect of Bristol, 1734

Bristol Bridge, the only way of crossing the river without using a ferry, was rebuilt between 1764 and 1768. The earlier medieval bridge was too narrow and congested to cope with the amount of traffic that needed to use it. A toll was charged to pay for the works, and when, in 1793, the toll was extended for a further period of time the Bristol Bridge Riot ensued. 11 people were killed and 45 injured, making it one of the most deadly riots of the 18th century.

Competition from Liverpool from 1760, the disruption of maritime commerce through war with France (1793) and the abolition of the slave trade (1807) contributed to the city's failure to keep pace with the newer manufacturing centres of the North and Midlands. The cotton industry failed to develop in the city; sugar, brass and glass production went into decline. The first Abraham Darby left Bristol for Coalbrookdale in Shropshire when his advanced ideas for iron production received no backing from local investors. Buchanan and Cossons cite "a certain complacency and inertia [from the prominent mercantile families] which was a serious handicap in the adjustment to new conditions in the Industrial Revolution period."

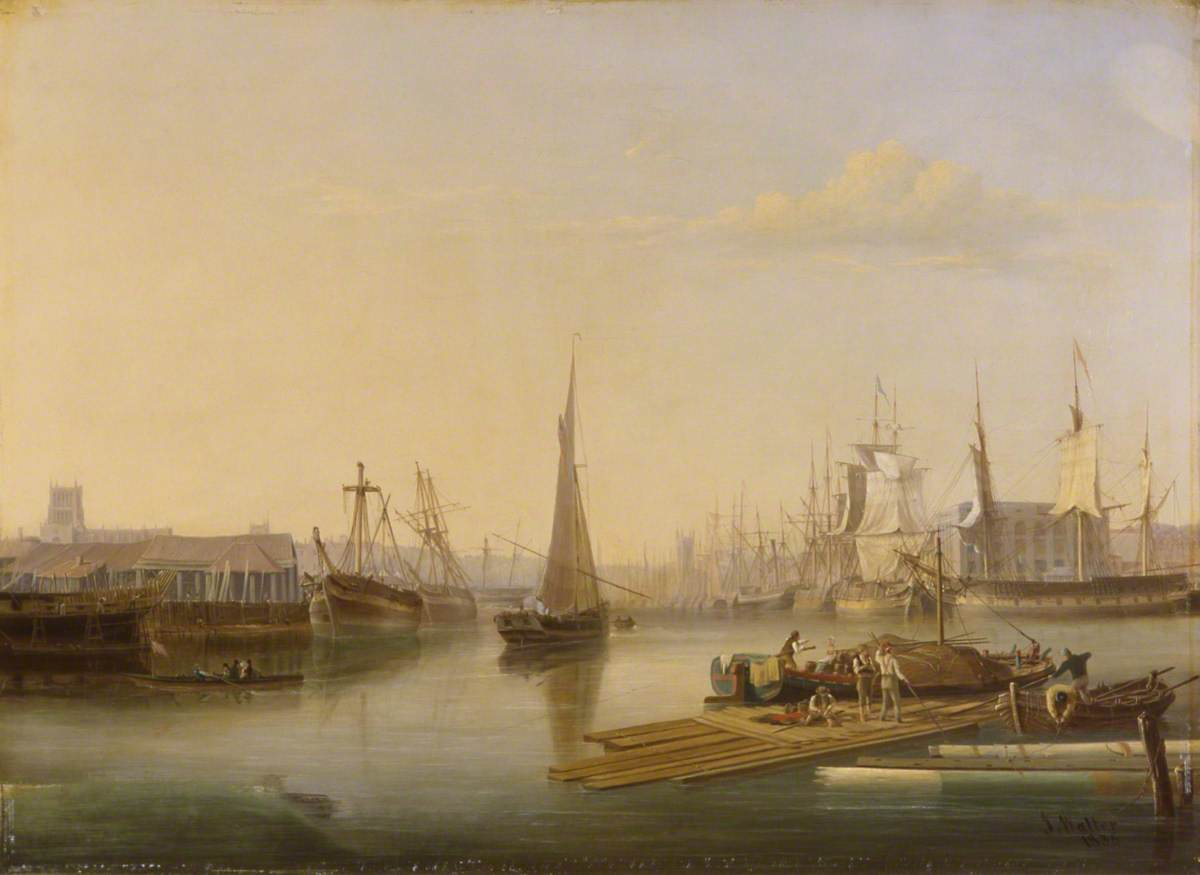
Bristol harbour has played a prominent role in the history of Bristol. Bristol Harbour, painting by Joseph Walter, 1836

The long passage up the heavily tidal Avon Gorge, which had made the port highly secure during the Middle Ages, had become a liability which the construction of a new "Floating Harbour" (designed by William Jessop) in 1804–1809 failed to overcome. Nevertheless, Bristol's population (61,000 in 1801) grew fivefold during the 19th century, supported by growing commerce. It was particularly associated with the leading engineer Isambard Kingdom Brunel, who designed the Great Western Railway between Bristol and London, two pioneering Bristol-built steamships, the SS Great Western and the SS Great Britain, and the Clifton Suspension Bridge.

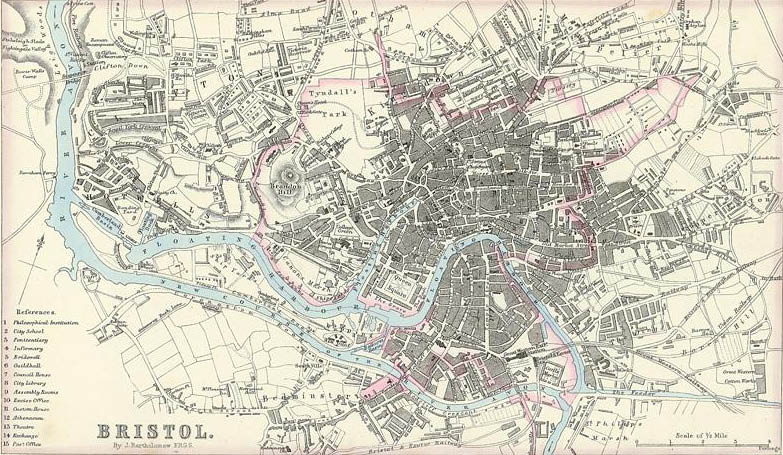
A map of Bristol published in 1866.

The new middle class, led by those who agitated against the slave trade, in the city began to engage in charitable works. Notable were Mary Carpenter, who founded ragged schools and reformatories, and George Müller who founded an orphanage in 1836. Badminton School was started in Badminton House, Clifton in 1858 and Clifton College was established in 1862. University College, the predecessor of the University of Bristol, was founded in 1876 and the former Merchant Venturers Navigation School became the Merchant Venturers College in 1894. This later formed the nucleus of Bristol Polytechnic, which in turn became the University of the West of England.

The Bristol Riots of 1831 took place after the House of Lords rejected the second Reform Bill. Local magistrate Sir Charles Wetherell, a strong opponent of the Bill, visited Bristol to open the new Assize Courts and an angry mob chased him to the Mansion House in Queen Square. The Reform Act was passed in 1832 and the city boundaries were expanded for the first time since 1373 to include "Clifton, the parishes of St. James, St. Paul, St. Philip, and parts of the parishes of Bedminster and Westbury". The parliamentary constituencies in the city were revised in 1885 when the original Bristol (UK Parliament constituency) was split into four.

Bristol lies on one of the UK's lesser coalfields, and from the 17th century collieries opened in Bristol, and what is now North Somerset and South Gloucestershire. Though these prompted the construction of the Somerset Coal Canal, and the formation of the Bristol Miners' Association, it was difficult to make mining profitable, and the mines closed after nationalisation in the 1940s.

At the end of the 19th century the main industries were tobacco and cigarette manufacture, led by the dominant W.D. & H.O. Wills company, paper and engineering. The port facilities were migrating downstream to Avonmouth and new industrial complexes were founded there.

== Modern history ==
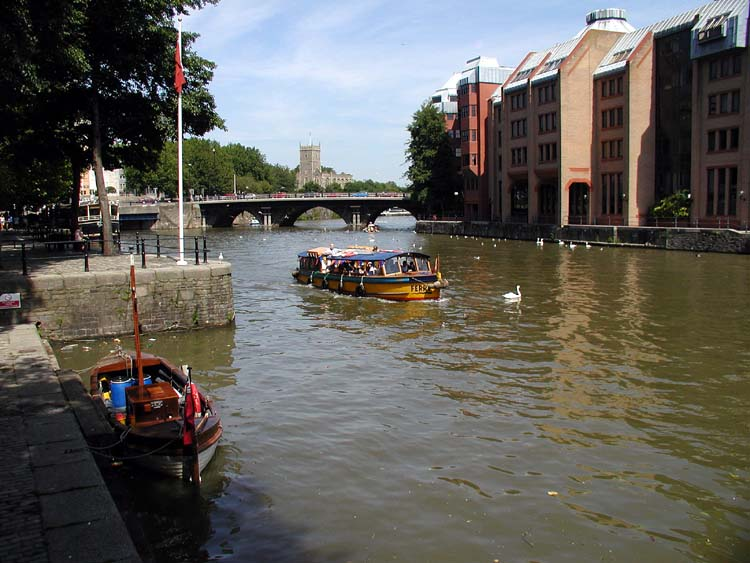
Bristol Bridge seen across the Harbour

The British and Colonial Aeroplane Company, which later became the Bristol Aeroplane Company, then part of the British Aircraft Corporation and finally BAE Systems, was founded by Sir George White, owner of Bristol Tramways in 1910. During World War I production of the Bristol Scout and the Bristol F.2 Fighter established the reputation of the company. The main base at Filton is still a prominent manufacturing site for BAE Systems in the 21st century. The Bristol Aeroplane Company's engine department became a subsidiary company Bristol Aero Engines, then Bristol Siddeley Engines; and were bought by Rolls-Royce Limited in 1966, to become Rolls-Royce plc which is still based at Filton. Shipbuilding in the city docks, predominately by Charles Hill & Sons, formerly Hilhouse, remained important until the 1970s. Other prominent industries included chocolate manufacturers J. S. Fry & Sons and wine and sherry importers John Harvey & Sons.

Bristol City F.C. (formed in 1897) joined the Football League in 1901 and became runners up in the First Division in 1906 and losing FA Cup finalists in 1909. Rivals Bristol Rovers F.C. (formed in 1883) joined the league in 1920. Gloucestershire County Cricket Club was formed in 1870 and have been runners up in the County Championship many times since.

Bristol City Council built over 15,000 houses between 1919 and 1939, enabling clearance of some of the worst slums in the city centre. The new estates were at Southmead, Knowle, Filwood Park, Sea Mills and Horfield. The city boundaries were extended to north and south to accommodate this growth. In 1926, the Portway, a new road along the Avon Gorge built at a cost of around £800,000, was opened linking the floating harbour to the expanding docks at Avonmouth.

As the location of aircraft manufacture and a major port, Bristol was a target of bombing during the Bristol Blitz of World War II. Bristol's city centre also suffered severe damage, especially in November and December 1940, when the Broadmead area was flattened, and Hitler claimed to have destroyed the city. The original central area, near the bridge and castle, is still a park featuring two bombed out churches and some fragments of the castle. Slightly to the north, the Broadmead shopping centre and Cabot Circus were built over bomb-damaged areas. About 1,300 people living or working in the city were killed, and nearly 100,000 buildings were damaged, at least 3,000 beyond repair.

As with other British cities, there was immigration from various Commonwealth countries in the post war years, which did lead to some racist tension. In 1963, a colour bar operated by Bristol Omnibus Company, which at that time refused to employ Black or Asian bus crews, was successfully challenged in the Bristol Bus Boycott, which was considered to have been instrumental in the eventual passage of the Race Relations Act 1968. In 1980 a police raid on a cafe in St Paul's sparked the St Pauls riot, which highlighted the alienation of the city's ethnic minorities.

Bristol aviation continued to develop in post war years. The Bristol Brabazon was a large trans-Atlantic airliner built in the late 1940s, based on developments in heavy bombers during World War II, but it received no sales orders and never went into production. Concorde, the first supersonic airliner was built in the 1960s, first flying in 1969. The aircraft never achieved commercial success, but its development did lay the foundation for the successful Airbus series of airliners, parts of which are produced at Filton in the 21st century.

In the 1980s the financial services sector became a major employer in the city and surrounding areas, such as the business parks on the northern fringe of what was now referred to as Greater Bristol or the Bristol Urban Area comprising the city, Easton-in-Gordano, Frampton Cottrell and Winterbourne, Kingswood, Mangotsfield and Stoke Gifford. High technology companies such as IBM, Hewlett Packard, Toshiba, and Orange, along with creative and media enterprises become significant local employers as traditional manufacturing industries declined.

Like much of British post-war planning, regeneration of Bristol city centre was characterised by large, cheap tower blocks, brutalist architecture and expansion of roads. Since the 1990s this trend has been reversed, with the closure of some main roads and the regeneration of the Broadmead shopping centre. In 2006 one of the city centre's tallest post-war blocks was torn down. Social housing tower blocks have also been demolished to be replaced by low rise homes.

The removal of the docks to Avonmouth, seven miles (11 km) downstream from the city centre, relieved congestion in the central zone of Bristol and allowed substantial redevelopment of the old central dock area (the Floating Harbour) in the late 20th century. The deep-water Royal Portbury Dock was developed opposite Avonmouth Docks in the 1970s and following privatisation of the Port of Bristol has become financially successful.

At one time the continued existence of the old central docks was in jeopardy as it was seen merely as derelict industry rather than an asset to be developed for public use. Since the 1980s millions of pounds have been spent regenerating the harbourside. 1999 saw the redevelopment of the city centre and the construction of Pero's footbridge; which now links the At-Bristol science centre at Canon's Marsh, opened in 2000, with other Bristol tourist attractions. Private investors are also constructing studio apartment buildings. The regeneration of the Canon's Marsh area is expected to cost £240 million. Crest Nicholson were the lead developers constructing 450 new flats, homes and waterside offices, under the guidance of The Harbourside Sponsors' Group which is a partnership between the City Council, developers, businesses, and public funders.

== See also ==
- Bristol Archives
- Bristol Record Society
- Buildings and architecture of Bristol
- History of Bristol City Council
- History of England
- History of local government in Bristol
- M Shed
- Timeline of Bristol history
