= Mary Anne Schimmelpenninck =

British writer

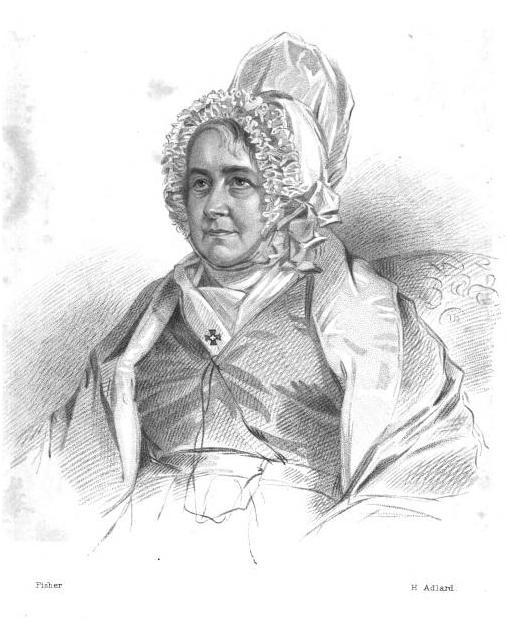
- Mary Anne Schimmelpenninck
- Born: 25 November 1778; Five Ways, Birmingham, England
- Died: 29 August 1856 (aged 77); Bristol, England
- Occupation: Writer

Mary Anne Schimmelpenninck (née Galton, 25 November 1778 – 29 August 1856) was a British writer in the anti-slavery movement.

== Early life ==
Born in Five Ways, Birmingham on 25 November 1778, she was the eldest child of Samuel "John" Galton and his wife, Lucy Barclay. Both parents were members of the Society of Friends, and brought up their children strictly. In 1785 the family moved to Great Barr Hall. There among their frequent visitors were James Watt, Richard Lovell Edgeworth, Thomas Day, Joseph Priestley, Samuel Parr, and Erasmus Darwin whose daughter Violetta married Mary Anne's eldest brother, Samuel Tertius Galton.

When about eighteen Mary Anne visited her cousins, the Gurneys of Earlham Hall, and Catherine Gurney, the eldest daughter, remained her friend through life. She was also the guest of Anna Barbauld; and the winter of 1799 was spent in London. Mary Martha Butt met her at Bath about 1801, and described her as simple, agreeable, and unaffected.

On 29 September 1806 Mary Anne Galton married Lambert Schimmelpenninck of Berkeley Square, Bristol, a member of a branch of a noble Dutch family in the shipping trade at Bristol. The newly married couple settled in the city. Mrs. Schimmelpenninck took part in local charities and education, holding classes for young people at her own house. About 1811 her husband fell into money troubles. At the same time a dispute regarding her settlements led to a breach between her and all the members of her family, which was never healed.

== Writer ==
Schimmelpenninck turned her attention to literature for a livelihood. Hannah More had, about this time, sent her some of the writings of the Port-Royalists. In 1813 she published a compilation based on one of those volumes, Narrative of a Tour to La Grande Chartreuse and Alet, by Dom. Claude Lancelot. A second edition was soon called for, and others followed. She pursued her investigations into the work of the Port-Royalists, and in 1815, during a tour on the continent, she visited Port Royal. In 1816 appeared, in 3 vols., Narrative of the Demolition of the Monastery of Port Royal des Champs. This work and its predecessor were republished, with additions, in 1829 under the title of Select Memoirs of Port Royal. A fifth edition appeared in 1858.

Among her books on other subjects was Theory on the Classification of Beauty and Deformity, 1815. She also developed a system for recording findings during phrenological examinations, published in 1827 as Phrenographic Register, or Phrenologist's Assistant in Recording Manipulations with Facility, Accuracy, and Despatch. Schimmelpenninck had prepared the phrenology report used in the prosecution of accused murderer John Horwood in 1821.

She also studied Hebrew with Mrs. Richard Smith, "her more than sister for forty-three years", and embodied the result in Biblical Fragments, 1821–2, 2 vols.

== Views ==
Schimmelpenninck passed through various phases of religious belief. Even as a child, when attending the Friends' meetings with her parents, she was troubled with doubts. She told Caroline Fox that she had "suffered from an indiscriminate theological education". In 1818 she joined the Moravian Church; and although towards the end of her life she was attracted to the Roman Catholic church, she remained a Moravian until her death.

== Later life ==
In 1837 Schimmelpenninck was attacked with paralysis, and moved to Clifton. Her health improved slowly. After her husband's death, in June 1840, she led a retired life. She died in Bristol on 29 August 1856, and was buried in the burying-ground of the Moravian chapel there.

== Works ==
Other works by Schimmelpenninck are:

- Asaph, or the Herrnhutters; a rhythmical sketch of the modern history of the Moravians, 1822.
- Psalms according to the Authorised Version, 1825.
- Some Particulars relating to the late Emperor Alexander, translated from the French, 1830.
- The Principles of Beauty, as manifested in Nature, Art, and Human Character, edited by Christiana C. Hankin, 1859.
- Sacred Musings on the Manifestations of God to the Soul of Man, edited by Hankin, 1860.

== Bibliography ==
- Life of Mary Anne Schimmelpenninck vol 1 Autobiography; ed. Christiana C Hankin; London, Longman, Green et al., 1858.
- Life of Mary Anne Schimmelpenninck vol 2 Biographical Sketch and Letters; ed. Christina C. Hankin; London, Longman, Green et al., 1858.
- Narrative of a Tour to La Grande Chartreuse and Alet
- Narrative of the Demolition of the Monastery of Port Royal des Champs
