= The Blue Bowl =

Pub in Hanham, South Gloucestershire

Coordinates: 51°26′47″N 2°30′31″W

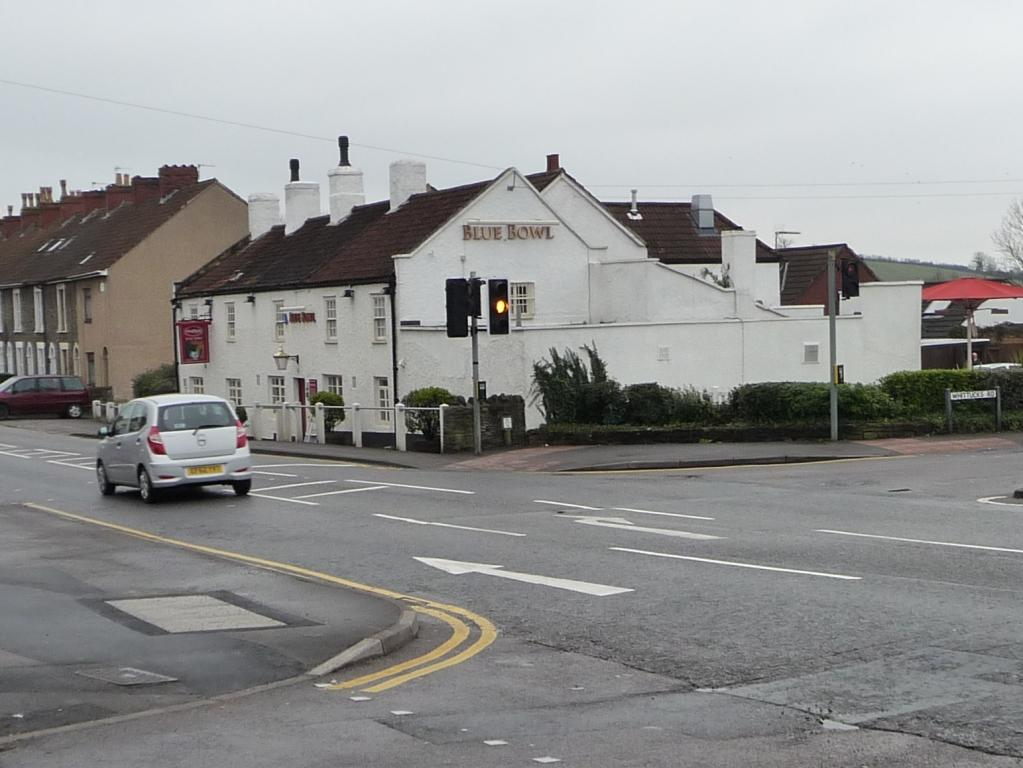
The Blue Bowl

The Blue Bowl is a public house in Hanham, South Gloucestershire, situated on Hanham High Street. It is thought to be one of the oldest pubs in the United Kingdom, being said to date back to the 14th century. There are no official records as to the age, but Saint Lyte wrote that it was an "old established hostelry" in 1480. The name of the pub was changed to 'The Mill House’ in 1996, but after objections from the public it was reverted to The Blue Bowl.

It is currently owned by Sizzling Pubs.
