= John Horwood =

British murderer

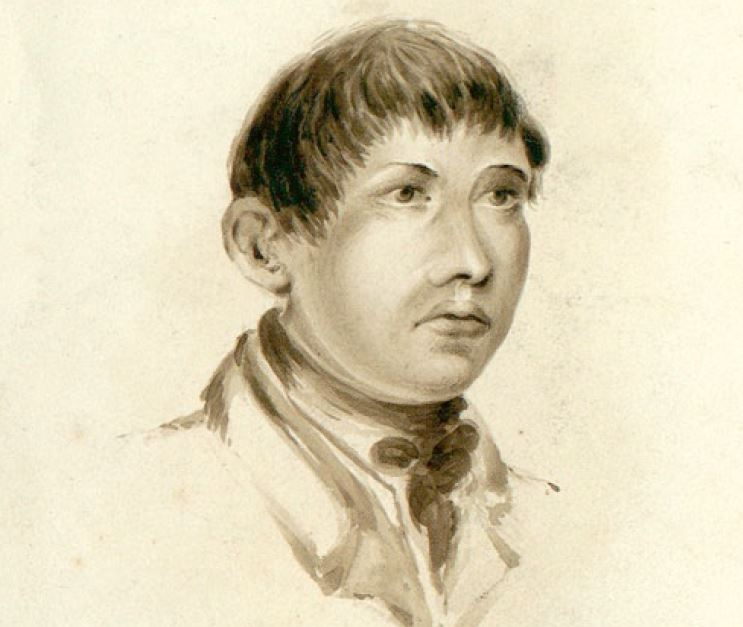
Portrait of John Horwood as he stood at the bar, during his trial, 11 April 1821

John Horwood (1803 – 13 April 1821) was a miner's son convicted of murder in Bristol, England, and executed in 1821. He was the first person to be hanged at Bristol New Gaol.

== Life ==
John Horwood was born in Hanham, the fifth son of Thomas and Phoebe Horwood, one of six boys and four girls in the family. Raised in a mining community before the Mines Act introduced a minimum age of ten for children working in mines, John worked in local pits as a child. He refused to continue working in the mines after a series of accidents, including the death of one of his brothers along with three other workers.

He subsequently worked with his father at a local spelter, most likely the Hanham Spelter Works, but was laid off due to his bad behavior, including mischief and vandalism, in 1819 when he was only 16. Around town, John Horwood was most known as a mischievous and destructive boy, who harassed and pulled pranks on his neighbors. He subsequently came to notoriety following the death of a local girl, Eliza Balsom. John was accused of throwing a stone which hit her head, leading to her death. He stood trial and was found guilty of murder for this act, and was hanged at Bristol New Gaol on 13 April 1821, just 3 days after his 18th birthday.

Various papers on the circumstances, Eliza's illness, the case against John and medical matters were collected together and bound by Dr Richard Smith, who had treated Eliza at the Bristol Royal Infirmary and acquired John's body for dissection and public presentation at the Infirmary. These papers are held in a single volume, the Horwood Book in the Bristol Archives. A subsequent review of the papers and examination of Eliza's skull was published in the British Medical Journal (BMJ) in 1869, raising questions about medical procedures and the validity of the trial for murder. More recent historical research has been conducted by a distant relative of John Horwood, also questioning the legitimacy of the charge of murder.

== Death of Eliza Balsom (Balsum/Balsam) and aftermath ==
John Horwood and Eliza Balsom were of similar age and grew up in a small community, and almost certainly knew each other since infancy. John stated this when asked how long he had known Eliza during questioning before his trial. They were briefly involved in a relationship but Eliza ended this in 1820, much to John's regret. Papers in the Horwood Book suggest that John remained infatuated and continued to seek Eliza, turning to harassment and greater violence when he was spurned.

"It appears that Horwood for some time past, teased the girl with proposals, which she had uniformly and indignantly refused: and having lattlerly endeavoured to intimidate her with his threats, she became alarmed at his conduct, and took every means of avoiding him.”

This newspaper report included in The Horwood Book goes on to document multiple attacks on Miss Balsom by Horwood through 1820 and 1821 including throwing oil of vitriol at her, although this is disputed in subsequent research. It was also suggested by the prosecution at the time that John Horwood was associated with the "Cock Road Gang", notorious for being violent troublemakers.

On a date around the 25 January 1821, he saw Eliza Balsom with another boy (William Waddy) and threw a stone which struck her on the temple. The stone appears to have caused only a minor injury initially, but she was treated at the Bristol Royal Infirmary. The exact date of the incident was disputed by various witnesses, so it is uncertain whether she required hospital treatment shortly after the incident or if the injury got worse in subsequent days. The BMJ report states that she walked to hospital for treatment for several days before requiring more invasive treatment, walking a distance of around ten miles from Hanham to the Infirmary and back each day.

Dr Smith noticed Eliza in a hospital waiting room on 31 January, and insisted that she was admitted for treatment of a depressed fracture. She made steady progress for several days but developed a fever on 10 February. Dr Smith consulted colleagues and, according to the diary of medical cases kept by Dr Edward Estlin (held at Bristol Archives), Eliza Balsom's wound was greatly infected so that Dr Richard Smith needed to clear the infection from inside the skull.

Dr Smith performed a trepanning procedure to cut away the bone. In the original papers, it is stated that he discovered an abscess under the surface of the skull which caused the death of Eliza Balsom. However, the subsequent BMJ paper suggests that the trepanning may have been the cause of the abscess and death, rather than the initial contusion. Eliza died four days later on 17 February 1821.

Dr Smith gave Horwood's name to the police, so police officers, sheriff's yeomen and members of the public went to Hanham to detain him.

“The villain guessed their errand, and tried to jump out from a bedroom window in his shirt… he seized a quarryman’s hammer, and placing himself on the top of the stairs, threatened, with horrid oaths, the destruction of all who approached… The villain made a great many blows with his hammer… The Officers closed upon him, knocked him down and after a desperate conflict, at last handcuffed him and dragged him to the carriage.

The trial took place at The Star Inn in Bedminster on 11 April 1821, with Smith testifying against him. The prosecution included a phrenological report undertaken by Mary Anne Schimmelpenninck to attempt to prove Horwood's guilt by the shape of his skull. This claimed that his chief mental characteristics were 'combativeness', 'self-esteem', and 'hope', however the 'bump of murder' which was supposedly a cranial characteristic of all murderers was not present. The strongest point in Horwood's defence was that the abscess on the brain might have been caused by the unclean dressings on the wound, and not directly by the stone attack though it would appear that this evidence was never put forward.

He was hanged two days later on temporary gallows erected above the New Gaol's gatehouse and his body was handed back to Smith for dissection in a public lecture at Bristol Royal Infirmary. The crowds gathered to watch the public hanging were so large that posters were put up warning people from being crowded over the bank of the New Cut and being drowned.

== The Horwood Book ==
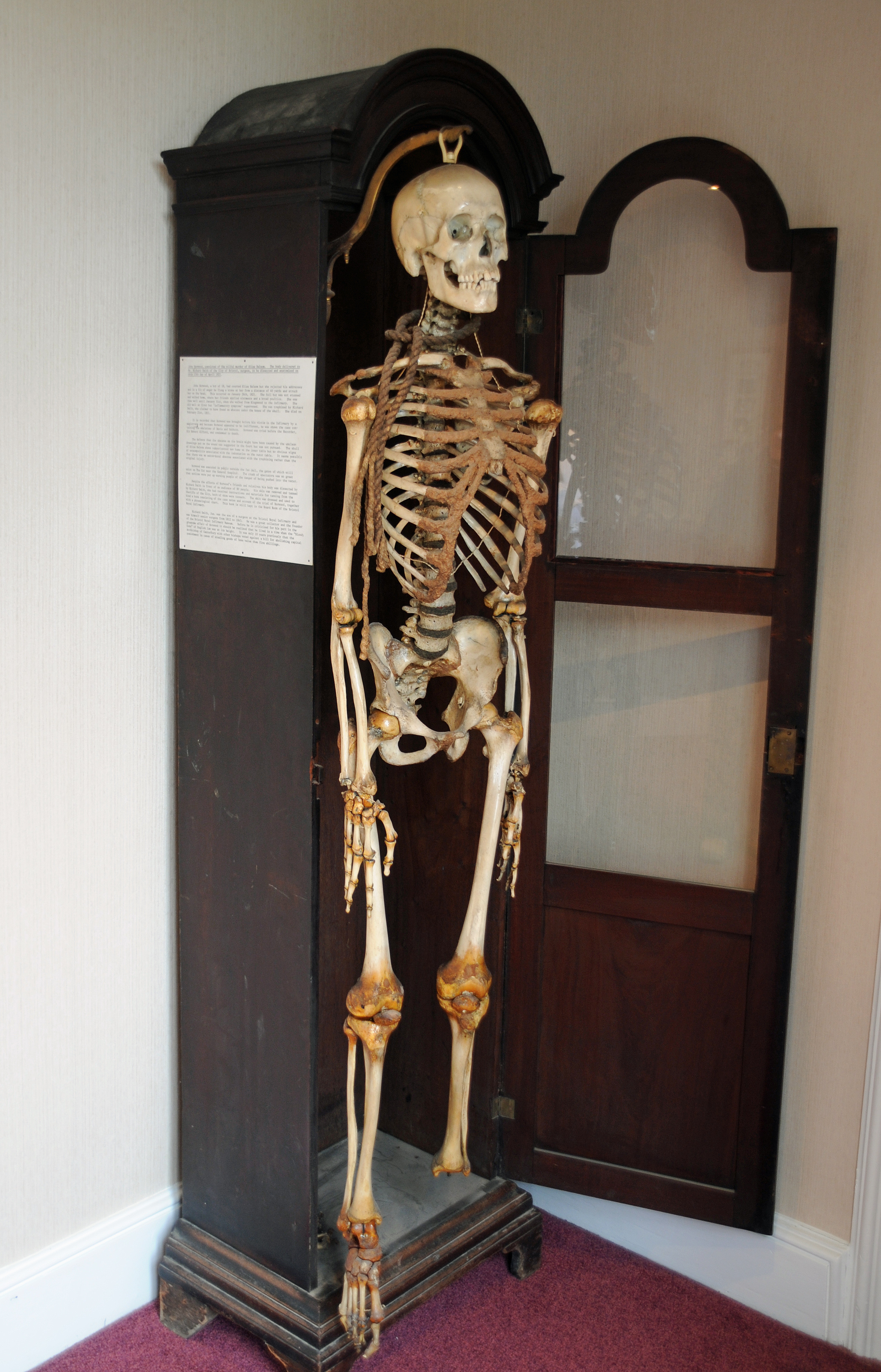
The skeleton of John Horwood, 18, in a Bristol University cupboard

Horwood's friends attempted to rescue the body on its route to Bristol Royal Infirmary for 'anatomisation' (dissection) and spirit it away on the river back to Hanham. Dr Richard Smith anticipated their plan and took the body by taxi during the night.

As part of the process of 'anatomisation' Horwood's skin had to be removed. In other cases the skin would have been incinerated as medical waste, but Dr Smith being an antiquarian chose to tan the skin, and use it to bind the papers documenting the murder, trial, execution and subsequent dissection. Horwood's remains were retained for medical dissection. The cost of the binding was 22 shillings, which is worth approximately £130 in the 21st century.

This book is held in the collections of Bristol Archives (Ref. 35893/36/v_i) (online catalogue) and is currently on display at M Shed museum in Bristol, alongside a contemporary dissection table, donated by Dr Richard Smith junior, which was used for surgical operations until 1890 when it was removed and re-used as a sideboard until 1999. The skin on the front cover of the book is embossed with a gallows motif and skulls and crossbones, with the Latin words Cutis Vera Johannis Horwood which translates to 'The True Skin of John Horwood'. The practice of anthropodermic bibliopegy is known to have been practised since the 17th century, and it was common to use a murderer's skin in this manner during the 18th and 19th centuries.

Smith kept the skeleton at his home until his death, when it was passed to the Bristol Royal Infirmary and later to Bristol University. The skeleton was kept hanging in a cupboard at Bristol University with a noose around its neck as an indication that the skeleton belonged to a convicted felon.

== 21st century funeral ==
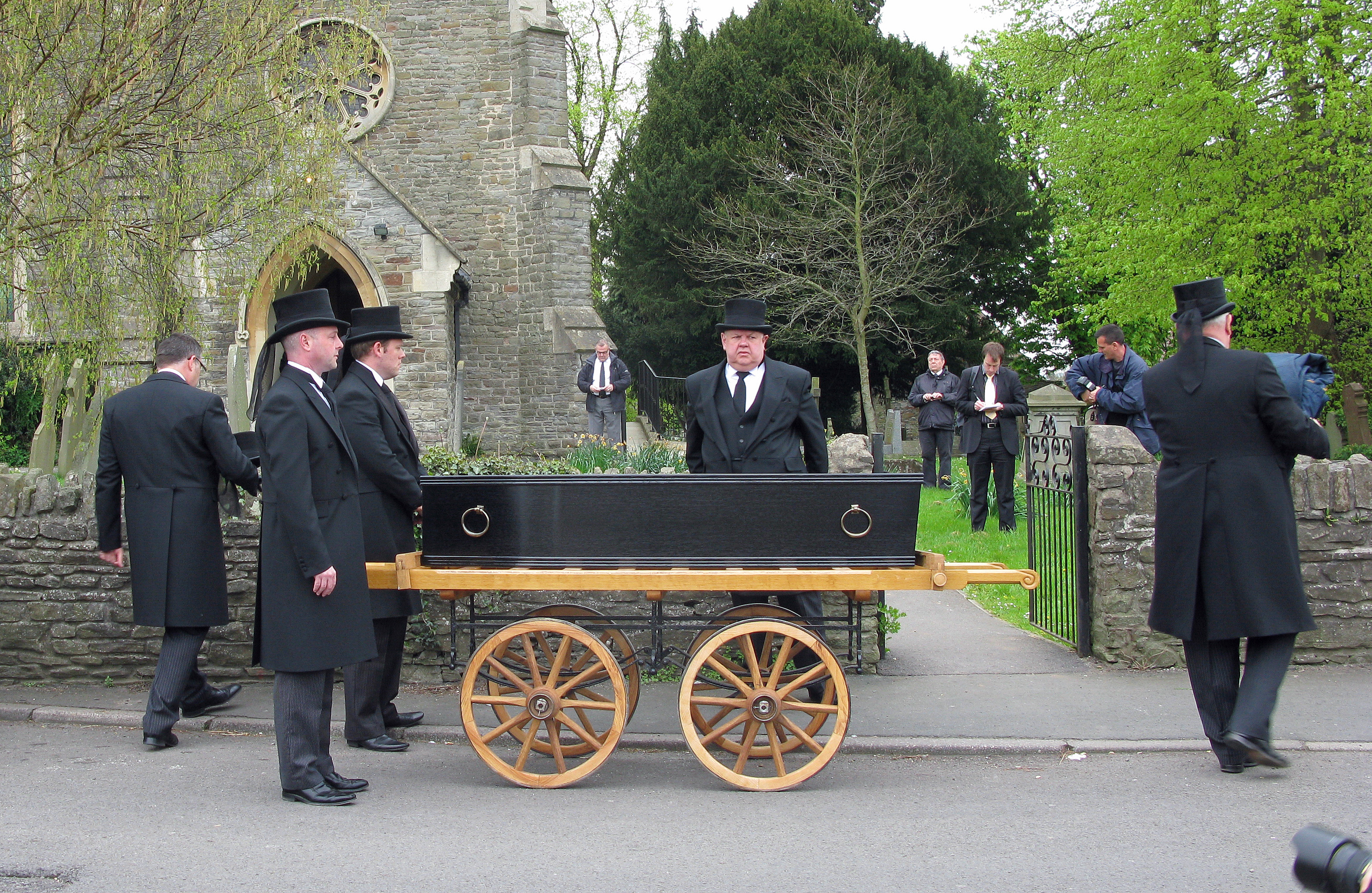
John Horwood's funeral, 13 April 2011. The coffin was carried on a wheeled bier in the manner of elegant funerals of the period of his death.

Horwood's skeleton was eventually buried alongside his father on 13 April 2011 at 1.30 pm at Christchurch, Hanham, exactly 190 years to the hour after he was hanged. The funeral was arranged by Mary Halliwell, the great-great-great-granddaughter of Horwood's brother. The coffin was draped in velvet and carried on a wheeled bier in the manner of elegant funerals of the period of his death.
