= Robert Ricart =

English medieval chronicler and cartographer

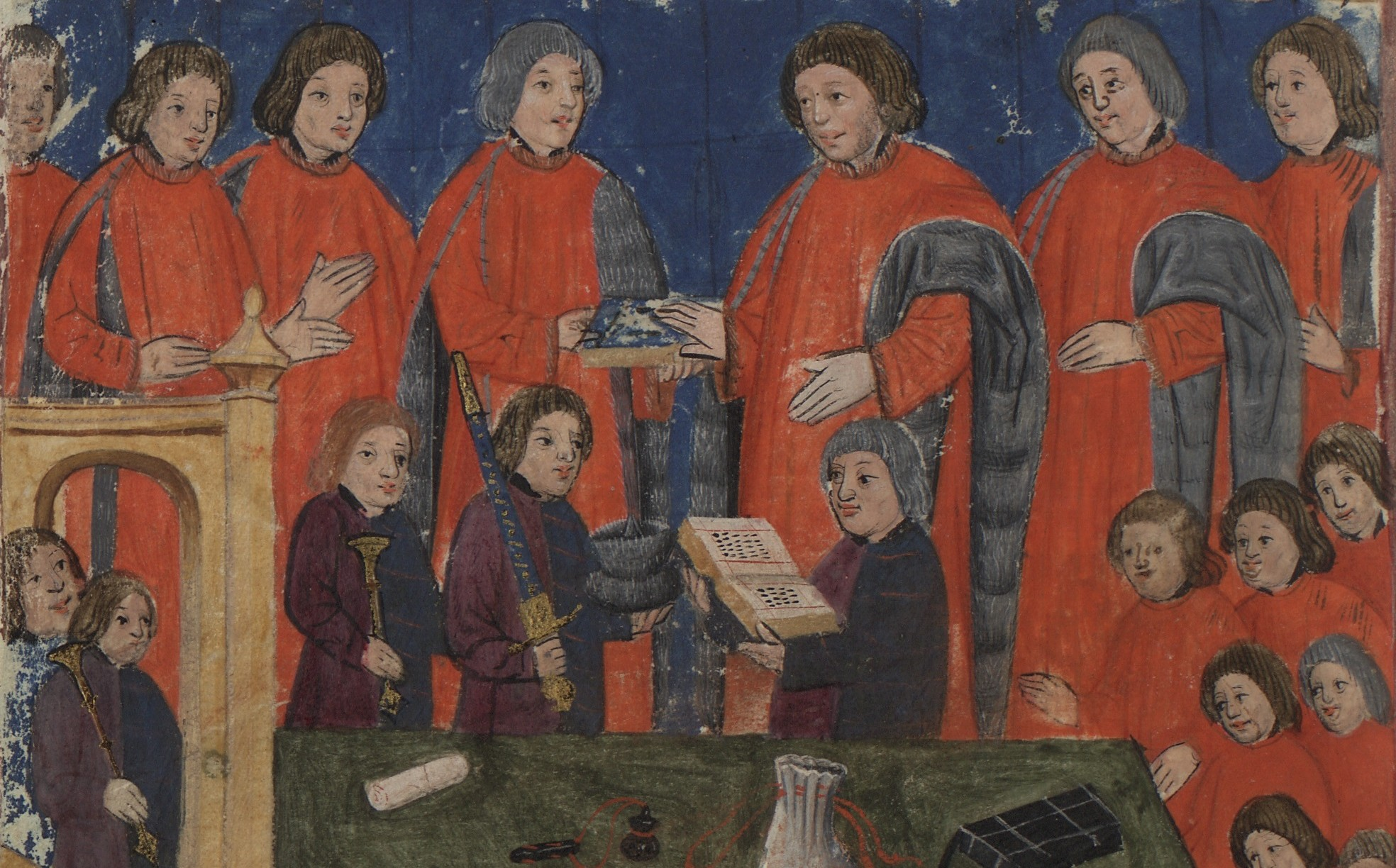
Ricart (holding the book) at the mayor-making in Bristol in September 1478

Robert Ricart (fl. 1466 – 1489/1508) was a town clerk in Bristol and the author of the earliest surviving English chronicle outside of London, The Maire of Bristowe is Kalendar. Ricart is known as the cartographer of the first known plan of an English town, in 1479, and for his brief near-contemporaneous, written comments about the disappearance of the princes in the tower.

== Biography ==
The date of Ricart's birth is not certain given the absence of his will. He was a brother of the ancient Gild of Kalendars and friend to William Canynges and acted as executor of his will. Gray postulated that Ricart commissioned William Worcestre's Bristol survey.

Ricart was likely a merchant close to Bristol power elites prior to his election as town clerk. He served as vestry clerk to the church of All Saints, Bristol, for 12 years before being elected town clerk or common clerk of the Bristol Corporation on 20 September 1478. He remained town clerk until at least 1489 or possibly until his death in 1508. Fleming suggests he was clerk until 1489 and may have died shortly afterwards.

As town clerk Ricart was paid £4 per year in addition to various fees and charges, including fees for provision of dice to councillors and escorting them to church.

In addition to compiling The Maire of Bristowe is Kalendar from 1478 or 1479 Ricart made contributions the Great Red Book and Little Red Book.

Ricart was reported to leave a sum of money on his death to be paid annually in equal proportions between the church of All Saints, Bristol, and the Gild of Kalendars but Toulmin Smith could not locate his will. He was succeeded as town clerk by Philip Ricart, assumed to be his son or a near relative.

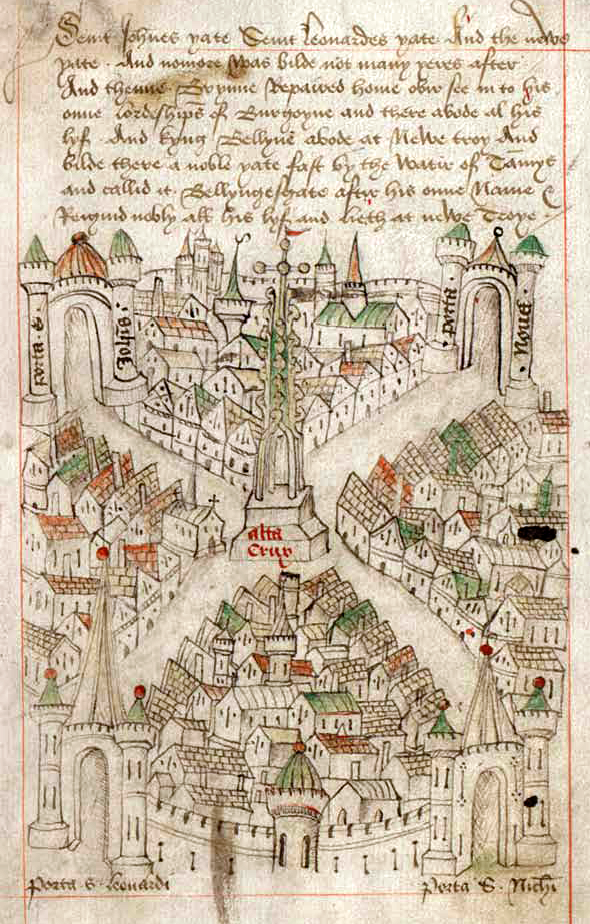
Ricart's 1479 map of Bristol

== Legacy ==
Paul Harvey, Durham University professor of medieval history and author of The History of Cartography in 1987, described 1479 Ricart's map of Bristol as "our only medieval map of an entire English town". In a review of medieval urban cartography Lilley notes Ricart's cartographic sensitivity and adherence to the principles of cartography.

In 1478 or 1479 Ricart was tasked by mayor William Spenser to compile The Maire of Bristowe is Kalendar, the earliest surviving chronicle of Bristol; earlier chronicles existed but had been lost. It is described by Thornton, deputy vice chancellor of the University of Huddersfield, as an important early English chronicle and noted as the oldest English chronicle outside of London.

The book also serves as a how-to guide for local government in the city and remains a primary source for scholars of urban government. Other scholars have drawn from the Kalendar in depictions of ceremony and oath-taking in the period, climate-related weather, urban founding myths, civic customs, and ceremony and festivity at Christmas.

== Controversies ==
=== Accuracy and revisionism ===
Thornton suggests that Ricart did not personally write much of the calendar but oversaw and directed its compilation.

The accuracy of Ricart's Kalendar and map of Bristol have been questioned. Dates of events are misplaced. Evans notes that Ricart omits from the chronicle the treason accusations against the mayor who commissioned the Kalendar. Peter Barber criticised Ricart's map as merchant-focused, by excluding Bristol Castle from the plan as well as the rivers Avon and Frome. Bristol Castle and district was not part of the Bristol municipality being in Gloucestershire until around the time of its demolition in 1655.

Liddy warns against taking Ricart's Kalendars at face value, citing its role in reinforcing the urban hierarchy of the time. Fleming asserts that the chronicles are written as a product of the political situation in Bristol at that time. The works have been critiqued as biased in attempting to present a view of Bristol history as loyal to the English crown and especially to downplay Bristol associations with Richard Neville.

=== Princes in the tower ===
Ricart is widely cited in modern assessments of the evidence of the fate of the princes in the tower.

Ricart's original account of the municipal year 1483/84 noted the death of Edward IV and the accession of Richard III but did not mention Edward V. Subsequently, Ricart added to the margin against the year 1483/84, modernised: "In this year the two sons of King Edward were put to silence in the Tower of London." Lucy Toulmin Smith's 1872 edition of Ricart's Kalendar omitted this line. In reports of this line Ricart is typically described as Recorder of Bristol although this was a legal role in the corporation separate and different to that of Town Clerk. John Twynyho was Recorder of Bristol from 1472 to 1485.

Matthew Lewis took this line as confirmation of the death of the princes in the tower. Phillipa Langley noted its ambiguity as to whether the princes were dead or just removed from sight. Langley asserts that although clearly written at least 12 months after the disappearance of the princes that Ricart's words could be one of the earliest written accounts in England of their fate. Langley asserts that this may indicate lack of general knowledge of the princes' disappearance at the time. Conversely, Thornton concludes the addition was not closely contemporaneous and was part of ongoing editing and compilation during the reign of Henry VII (1485–1509).
