= New Gaol, Bristol =

Building in Bristol, England

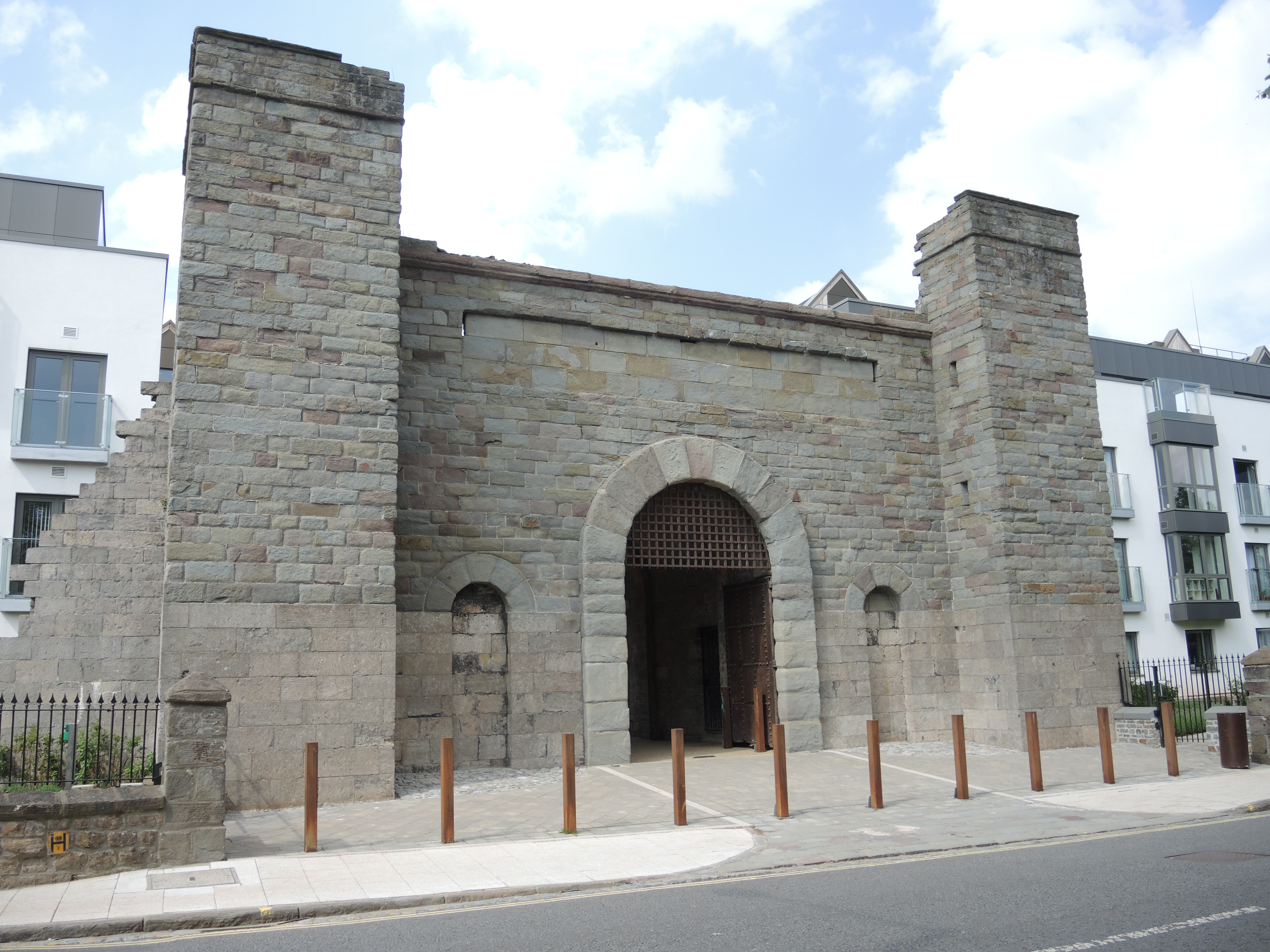
- Preserved gateway on Cumberland Road

- Location within Bristol

General information
- Location: Bristol, England
- Coordinates: 51.4462°N 2.5980°W
- Completed: 1832
- Demolished: 1898 (partially)

Design and construction
- Architect: Richard Shackleton Pope

The New Gaol (also sometimes known as The Old City Gaol) was a prison located in Spike Island, Bristol, England, operational between 1820 and 1883.

== History ==
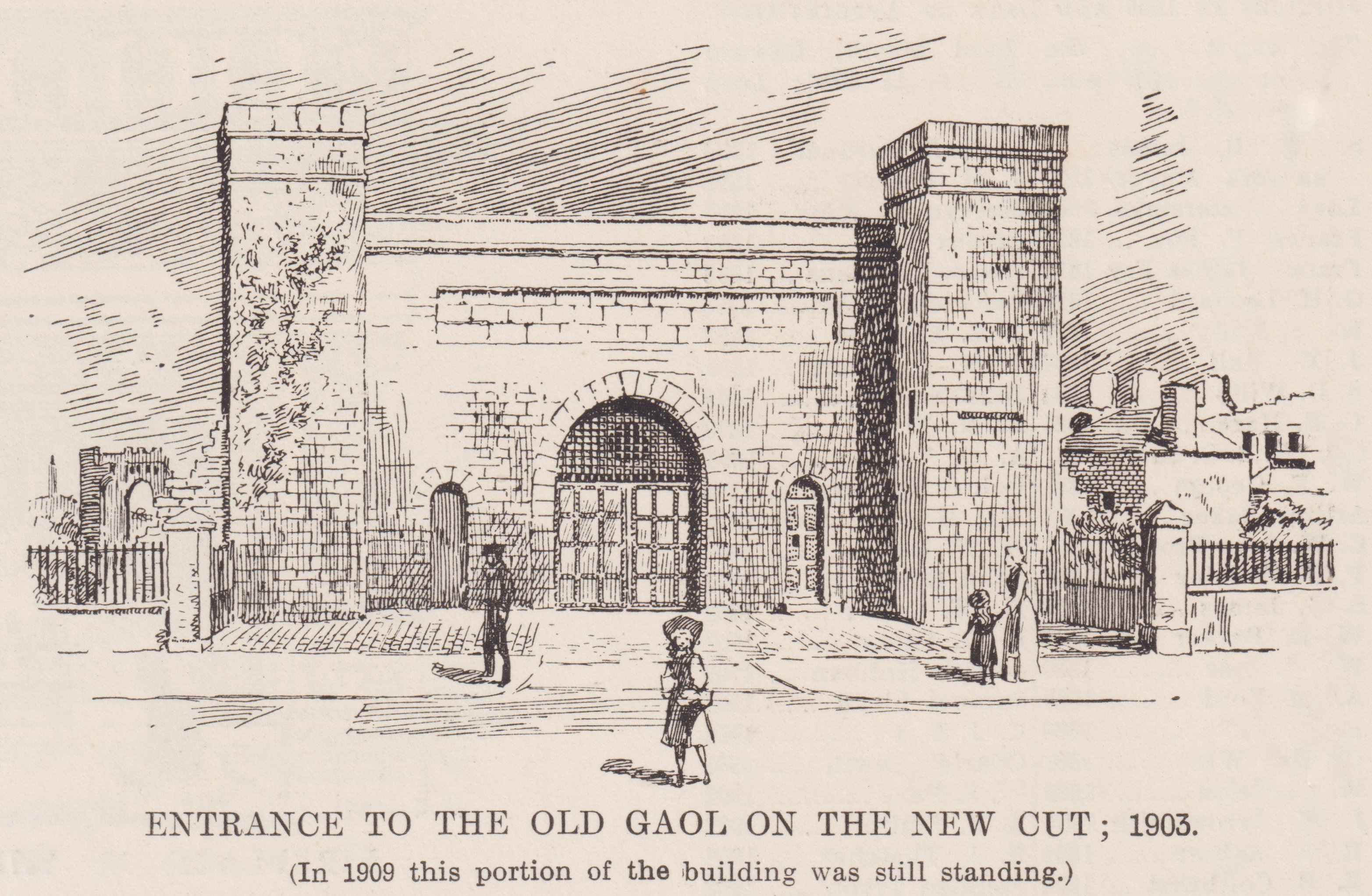
Old Gaol, 1903

In June 1816, the 'shocking state' of Newgate Gaol in Bristol resulted in an Act of Parliament to facilitate the building of a New Gaol in Bedminster, at a cost of £60,000.

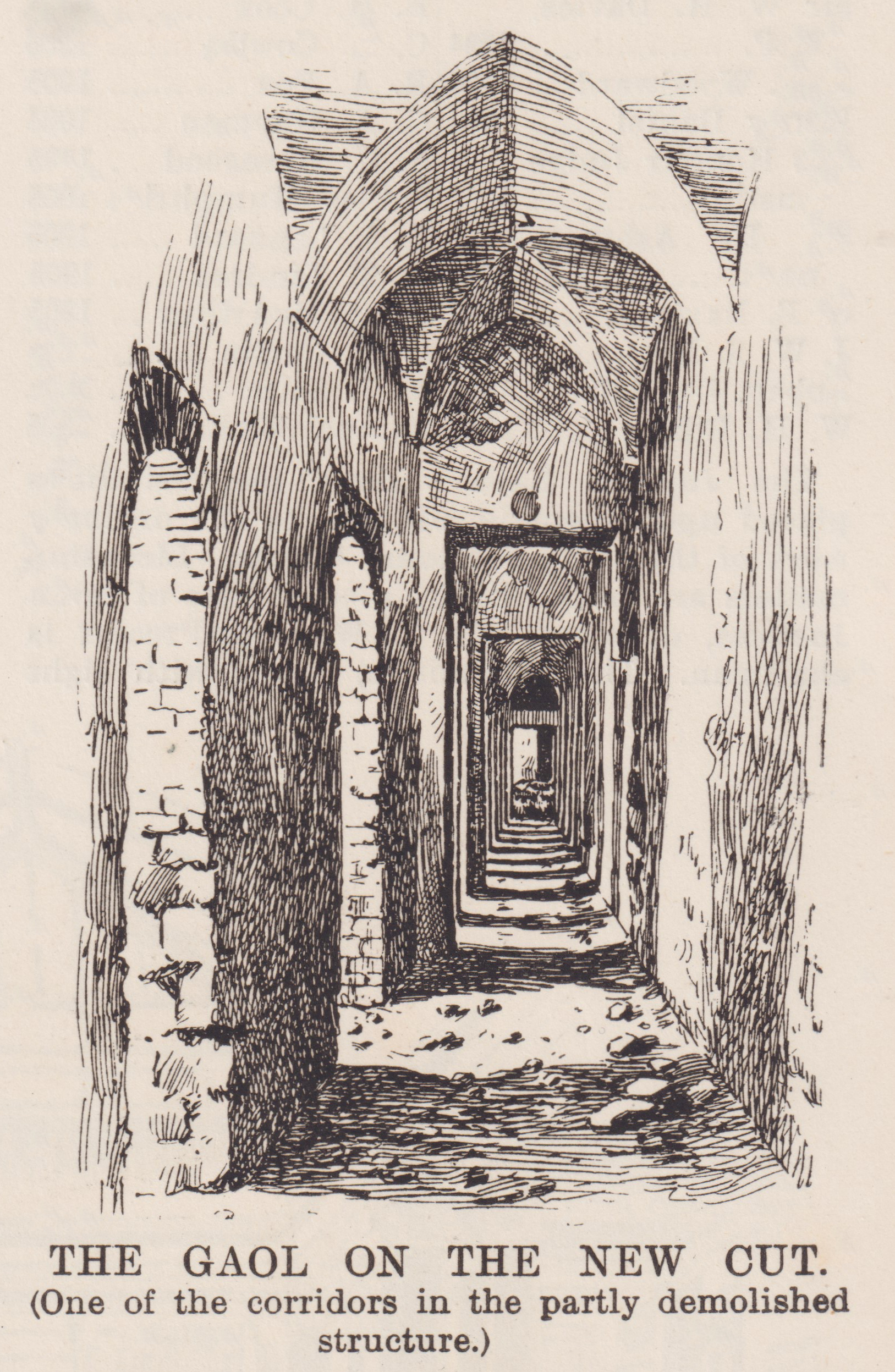
Partly demolished gaol, c.1908

The original New Gaol was designed by Henry Hake Seward and opened in 1820. In 1831, it was destroyed during the Bristol Riots and was rebuilt to designs by Richard Shackleton Pope, but was never properly completed until 1872. The gaol was closed in 1883 due to poor conditions and was sold to the Great Western Railway in 1895, which demolished most of the site in 1898. In 1884, Horfield Prison was built to replace it.

In 1821, three days after his eighteenth birthday, John Horwood was the first person to be hanged at the Gaol for murdering Eliza Balsum by hurling a pebble at her which hit her on the right temple and she then tumbled into a brook.

English Heritage designated The Gaol entrance wall and gateway and the south-east perimeter wall as a Grade II listed building. It is now the centre-piece of a redevelopment project in this area of the city.

== Archives ==
Papers related to the New Gaol (Ref. 17128) (online catalogue), and plans including Ref. 17567/5 (online catalogue) and 4312/76 (online catalogue) are held at Bristol Archives.

== See also ==
- Grade II listed buildings in Bristol
