= The Maire of Bristowe is Kalendar =

Book compiled by Robert Ricart

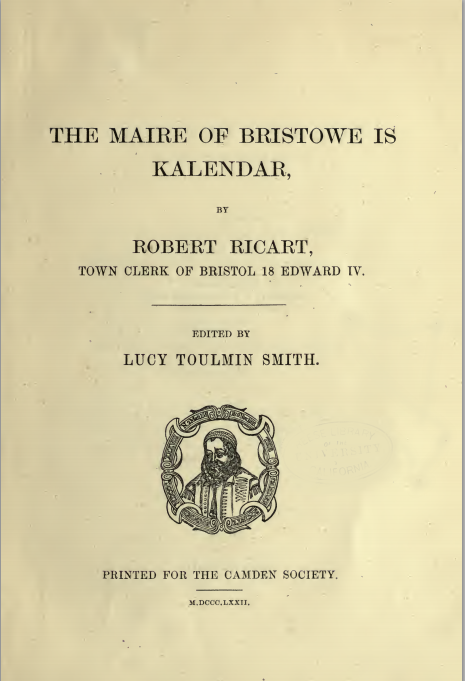
- Frontispiece of 1872 transcription of The Maire of Bristowe is Kalendar by the Camden Society
- Author: Robert Ricart
- Subject: History of Bristol
- Publication date: circa 1490
- Publication place: England
- Media type: manuscript

The Maire of Bristowe is Kalendar (Ricart's Calendar) is a book compiled in the late 15th century by Robert Ricart, town clerk of Bristol, England. The work consists of six parts giving a history of England and of the city of Bristol, a list of civic officers, and details of local customs and ceremonies. Commissioned by mayor William Spencer, the Kalendar was started circa 1478–79. Scribed on vellum, separated by leaves of parchment, the book was reproduced in print in the 19th century for Lucy Toulmin Smith's edition, which omitted some content. It is regarded as one of the earliest examples of a town chronicle outside London.

Little is known of Ricart, apart from his office as town clerk and the possibility that he was a merchant, also known as Robert Ricardes. He also appears to have authored parts of the Great Red Book of Bristol, as well as the Little White Book. Both books contain references to his being common clerk and as a witness. His entries in the Kalendar date from 1479 until 1506.

The Kalendar is held at the Bristol Archives in Hotwells, Bristol. The original is fragile, but the contents may be viewed by microfiche.

== Synopsis ==
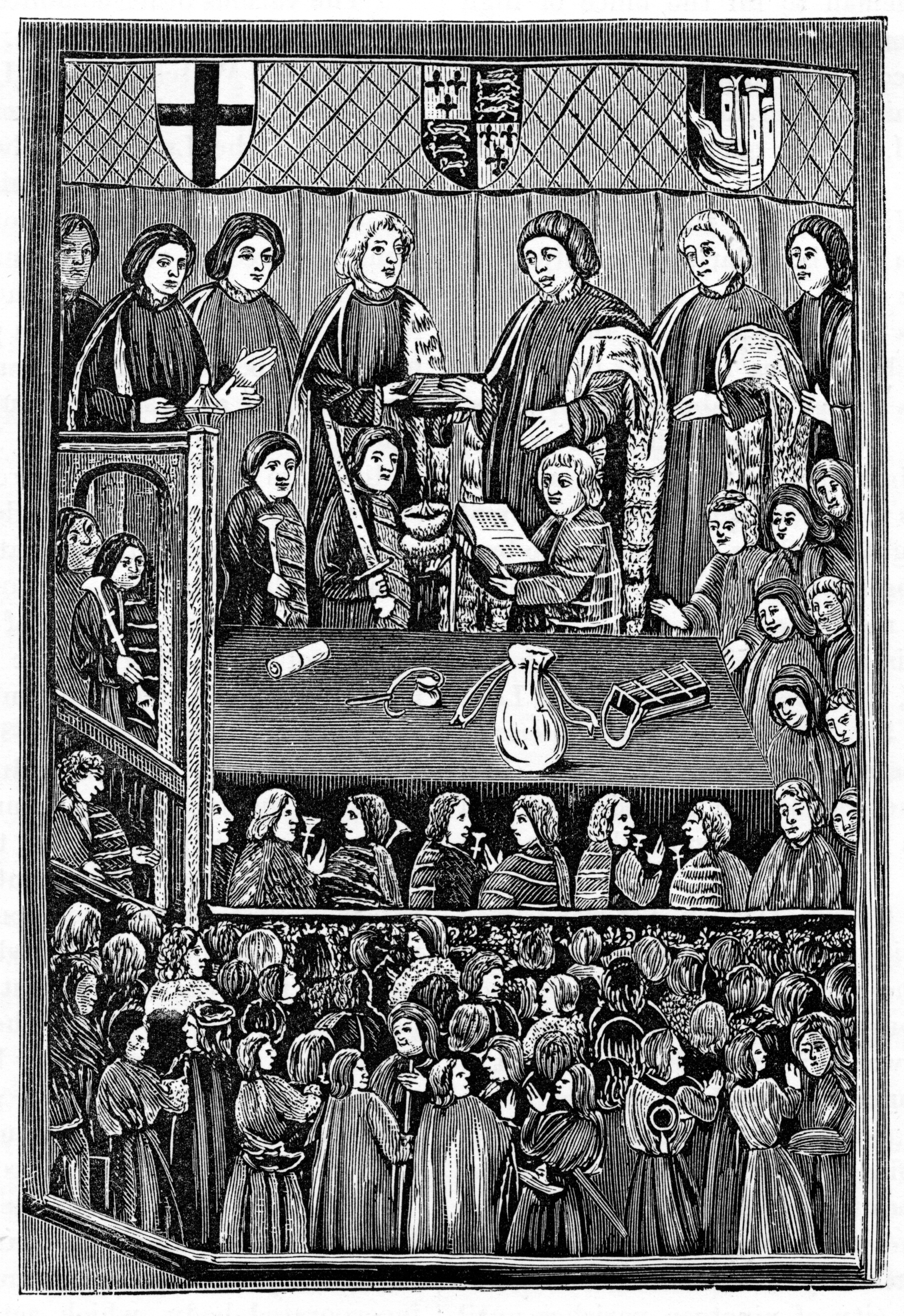
Induction of the Mayor from Ricart's Calendar

=== Prologue ===
At the start of the book, Ricart details his plan for the execution of the work in six parts, although this plan was not in the end adhered to, he informs the reader that Spencer had commissioned the work to preserve the ancient customs of the town, for maynteyneng of the said fraunchises herafter more duely and freely to be executed and excercised, and the perfaitter had in remembraunce.

=== First part ===
This consists of a history of England, from the time of Brut or Brute (Brutus of Troy), up until the reign of Harold Godwinson. The section is based on earlier sources such as Wace's verse epic Roman de Brut, which in turn is based on Geoffrey of Monmouth's Historia Regum Britanniae. The town of Bristol is represented as having been founded by Brennius, one of Brutus' sons. A short interlude at the end of the first part, describes Joseph of Arimathea's visit to Britain and an account of the founding of the abbey at Glastonbury in Somerset.

=== Second part ===
Covering the period from the Norman conquest up until the death of John, King of England in 1216, this section is based heavily on Matthew Paris' Flores Historiarum. Interpositions contain accounts of the building of Bristol Castle by the Earls of Gloucester and their founding of St. James' Priory, Fitzhardings' foundation of St. Augustine's Abbey, the ancestry of William the Bastard, and an account of the charter and privileges granted to Bristol by King John.

=== Third part ===
In this section, the material is listed under the terms of office of the town mayors, starting with Adam le Page in the earlier sections it was arranged by the reigns of kings. Much of the subject matter is derived from London chronicles of the time with little local content until the early 15th century, when information on grain prices, William II Canynges, local reaction to the Cornish Rebellion of 1497, ship losses, and bad weather started to appear alongside accounts of executions and the Wars of the Roses.

=== Fourth part ===
The fourth section contains descriptions of the oaths of office administered to civic officials, regulations for the sale of bread, coal, and other commodities, civic ceremonies, robes of office, and judicial matters.

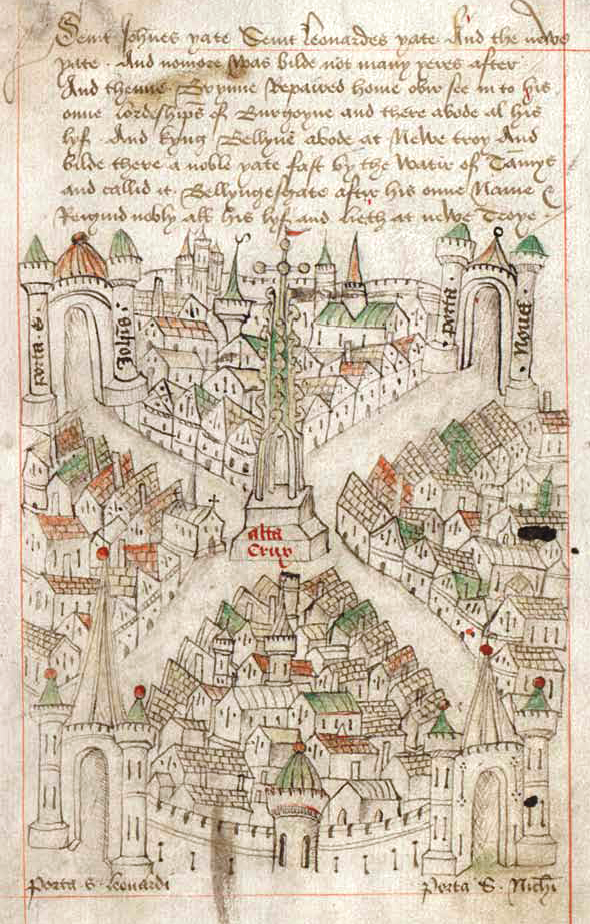
Robert Ricart's map of Bristol

=== Fifth part ===
The whole of this section is a reproduction of the text of the 1374 charter, which granted Bristol civic status, together with the contents of King John's 118 charter.

=== Sixth part ===
The last section is mostly a transcription of a book belonging to Henry Darcy, Mayor of London in 1339, which is very similar to the Liber Albus or White Book, an account of the laws of the city of London, written by town clerk John Carpenter in 1419.

=== Illustrations ===
The Kalendar contains eighteen illustrations, mostly depicting kings, but there is a notable plan of the town of Bristol, showing its principal features, and an illustration of the annual mayor making ceremony.

== Bibliography ==
- Fleming, P. (2004) "Making history: culture, politics and the Maire of Bristowe Is Kalendar". In: Biggs, D., Michalove, S. and Compton Reeves, A., eds. (2004) Reputation and Representation in Fifteenth Century Europe. Brill, pp. 289–316. ISBN 9004136134
- Fleming, Peter, ed. (2015) The Maire of Bristowe is Kalendar (Bristol Record Society Publications, Vol. LXVII).
- Toulmin Smith, Lucy, ed. (1872), The Maire of Bristowe is Kalendar, by Robert Ricart, Town Clerk of Bristol 18 Edward IV Camden Society.
