= William de la Founte =

British trader (died 1495)

- Died: 1495
- Occupation: Entrepreneur

William de la Founte (died 1495) was a Bristol merchant who became one of the first English entrepreneurs to profit from the slave trade.

de la Founte had established his business interests in Lisbon and from 1480 also in Huelva, Andalusia. He participated in the trafficking of slaves to the soap industry in Lower Andalusia.

de la Founte provided surety for Wiliam Weston in 1490.
