= Bristol Corporation of the Poor =

Former poor relief body in England

- Watercolour of St Peter's Hospital, Bristol, former headquarters of the Bristol Corporation of the Poor, 1894
- Formation: May 19, 1696; 330 years ago
- Dissolved: 17 October 1836
- Type: Charitable organisation
- Headquarters: St Peters Hospital, Bristol

Bristol Workhouse Act 1695
- Act of Parliament
- Parliament of England
- Long title: An Act for erecting of Hospitals and Workhouses within the City of Bristoll, for the better employing and maintaining the Poor thereof.
- Citation: 7 & 8 Will. 3. c. 32 Pr.
- Territorial extent: England and Wales

Dates
- Royal assent: 10 April 1696
- Commencement: 22 November 1695 (Note: Start of session.)

Status: Current legislation

The Bristol Corporation of the Poor was the board responsible for poor relief in Bristol, England when the Poor Law system was in operation. It was established in 1696 by the Bristol Workhouse Act 1695 (7 & 8 Will. 3. c. 32 Pr.). The main promoter of the act was a merchant, John Cary, who proposed "That a spacious workhouse be erected in some vacant place, within the city, on a general charge, large enough for the Poor, who are to be employed therein; and also with room for such, who, being unable to work, are to be relieved by charity."

Upon establishment of the corporation the city aldermen chose four of the "honestest and discreetest inhabitants" from each of the twelve city wards to serve as "Guardians of the Poor". This caused some resentment amongst the city churchwardens who had previously administered poor law funds and who withheld funds raised from the general rates. The corporation raised funds by donation and established the first workhouse at a building called Whitehall, adjacent to the Bridewell.

In 1698, the corporation bought the former home of merchant Robert Aldworth who had left £1,000 in his will for the establishment of a workhouse. This building became known as St Peters Hospital, and stayed in use until the 1830s. It was destroyed in the blitz during World War II.

By 1826, the corporation had acquired by donation a large number or properties and estates, bringing in a considerable income. In 1836, following the passage of the Municipal Corporations Act 1835, Bristol Corporation of the Poor along with other municipal charities was transferred to the Bristol Charity Trustees, which later became Bristol Municipal Charities. This enabled them to buy the site of the defunct prison in Stapleton, hence founding Blackberry Hill Hospital.

== Archives ==
The majority of the records of the Bristol Poor Law Union were destroyed during the Bristol Blitz. However, some of the records had been transcribed and published by the Bristol Record Society before that time. Bristol Archives holds the surviving archives of Stapleton Workhouse and Clifton Workhouse (Ref. 30105) (online catalogue).

== Cited works ==
- Butcher E. E. (ed.), Bristol Corporation of the Poor, Selected Records, 1696-1834 (Bristol Record Society Publications., Vol. III, 1932)
- Butcher, E. E. Bristol Corporation for the Poor 1696-1898 (Bristol Historical Association pamphlets, no. 29, 1972), 23 pp.
- Johnson, James. Transactions of the Corporation of the Poor, in the City of Bristol, During a Period of 126 Years. Broadmead, Bristol. P. Rose. 1826
