= Bristol Record Society =

Learned society in England

The Bristol Record Society is a text publication society which publishes scholarly editions of historical records and texts relating to the history of the City of Bristol. Founded in 1929, it is one of the oldest such societies devoted to the publication of material relating to an individual town or city. Through its history, it has typically published at least one volume each year, on matters ranging from the civic charters of the medieval city, to the diary of Sarah Fox, an 18th-century Quaker. The core aims of the Society are to encourage the preservation / study of historical documents relating to the history of Bristol and to make available the historical material that can be used to study the city's history.

All the Bristol Record Society's volumes are available as e-publications, with the older volumes having been scanned professionally and placed on the Internet Archive. Volumes less than five years old are available to subscribers from its own website before being moved to the Internet Archive.

Since 2019 the Society has been engaged in digitising and epublishing primary and secondary works relating to the history of Bristol. These include the 120 pamphlets of the Bristol Historical Association (published 1960-2007). The Society has also digitised and e-published over 100 other books and articles. These include primary sources, secondary works and topographical images.

The Society publishes an occasional electronic series of works that have not met the editorial standards necessary for formal publication but which it nevertheless deems useful. These include records relating to Bristol's efforts to suppress the Great Plague of 1665-6 and the medical case notes of a prominent 18th-century Bristol physician.

All the Society's electronic publications can be found in the Bristol Record Society Collection of the Internet Archive.

The Society also publishes occasional peer-reviewed articles on its website called 'Stories from the archives'. These focus on archival discoveries and are intended "to illustrate the extent to which History is rooted in explorations conducted in archives and through primary sources".

Other activities have included the electronic publication of images relating to the history of Bristol on Wikimedia, the editing of Wikipedia pages that relate to the history of Bristol and the creation of a googlemap of the early modern annual Bristol Perambulation of the county boundary.
