= Hanham =

Civil parish in Gloucestershire, England

Coordinates: 51.44962°N 2.51626°W

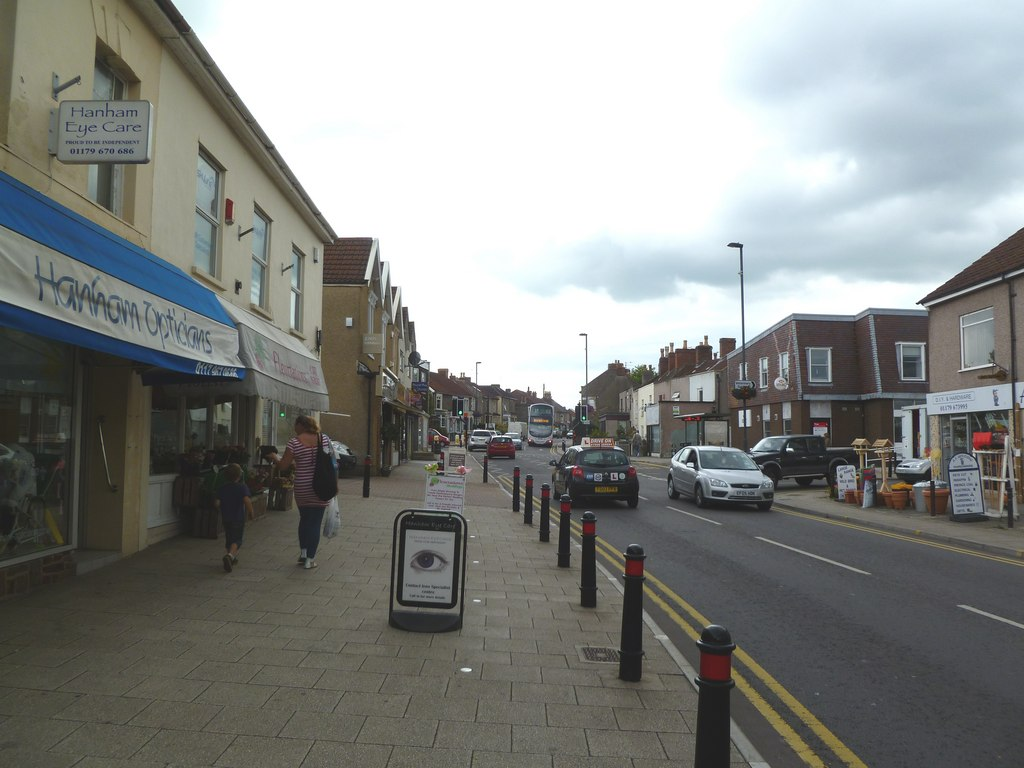
- Hanham High Street

- Location within Gloucestershire
- Population: 6,572 (2021 census)
- Unitary authority: South Gloucestershire
- Ceremonial county: Gloucestershire
- Region: South West
- Country: England
- Sovereign state: United Kingdom
- Post town: Bristol
- Postcode district: BS15
- Police: Avon and Somerset
- Fire: Avon
- Ambulance: South Western
- UK Parliament: North East Somerset and Hanham

Hanham is a suburban neighbourhood and civil parish in South Gloucestershire, England. Hanham is part of the Bristol Built-up Area, adjacent to, but not within the city boundaries of Bristol.

The post code area of Hanham is BS15. The population of this civil parish taken at the 2021 census was 6,572.

== History ==
Tom Cribb, once world champion bare-knuckle boxer, was born in Hanham. Stephen Merchant was also born in Hanham.

Hanham is also the first place in the UK to trial Gordon Brown's new eco-towns. Built on the former Hanham Hall Hospital site, the new village serves as a blueprint for Gordon Brown's proposed five eco-towns that will provide up to 100,000 zero-carbon dwellings across the country.

The Blue Bowl has been claimed to be one of the oldest public houses in the country.

== Governance ==
Hanham became a civil parish on 1 April 2003.

An electoral ward in the same name exists. The ward stretches south from Hanham to Hanham Abbots. The total population of the ward taken from the 2011 census was 10,311

== Demographics ==
Census population of Hanham parish
Census	Population	Female	Male	Households	Source
2001	6,107	3,220	2,887	2,455	
2011	6,128	3,143	2,985	2,630	
2021	6,572	3,359	3,213	2,767	
