= Altarnun and Stoke Climsland (electoral division) =

Electoral division of Cornwall in the UK

- ward Cornwall Council
- Boundary of Altarnun and Stoke Climsland in Cornwall from 2021.
- County: Cornwall

Current ward
- Created: 2021
- Councillor: Adrian Parsons (Liberal Democrat)
- Number of councillors: One
- Created from: Altarnun; Stokeclimsland

Altarnun and Stoke Climsland is an electoral division of Cornwall in the United Kingdom which returns one member to sit on Cornwall Council. It was created at the 2021 local elections, being formed from the former divisions of Altarnun and Stokeclimsland. The current councillor is Adrian Parsons, a Liberal Democrat.

== Extent ==
Altarnun and Stoke Climsland represents part of the very south west of the town of Launceston (alongside Launceston South), the villages of Fivelanes, Altarnun, Polyphant, Bathpool, Middlewood, North Hill, Coad's Green, Lewannick, South Petherwin, Lawhitton, Lezant, Treburley, Stoke Climsland, and the hamlets of Bolventor, Bowithick, South Carne, Trewint, Treween, Trevadlock, Trebartha, Berriowbridge, Penhole, Newtown, Illand, Congdon's Shop, Trenhorne, Daw's House, Larrick, Little Comfort, Trebullett, Trekenner, Rezare, Goosewell, Venterdon, Pempwell, Old Mill, Luckett, Downgate. The division also covers the outskirts of the village of Kelly Bray, which is represented by Callington and St Dominic. The village of Bray Shop is shared with the Lynher division.

== Election results ==
=== 2021 election ===
2021 election: Altarnun and Stoke Climsland
| Party | Candidate | Votes | % | ±% |
|---|---|---|---|---|
| Liberal Democrats | Adrian Parsons (Note: Incumbent councillor, formerly representing Altarnun) | 1,364 | 50.5 | |
| Independent | Neil Burden (Note: Incumbent councillor, formerly representing Stokeclimsland) | 1,063 | 39.3 | |
| Green | Joseph Terris | 241 | 8.9 | |
| Majority | | 301 | 11.1 | |
| Rejected ballots | | 35 | 1.3 | |
| Turnout | | 2703 | 48.9 | |
| Registered electors | | 5532 | | |
| Liberal Democrats win (new seat) | | | | |

=== 2025 election ===
2025 election: Altarnun and Stoke Climsland
| Party | Candidate | Votes | % | ±% |
|---|---|---|---|---|
| Liberal Democrats | Adrian Parsons | 1,666 | 61.3 | +10.8 |
| Reform | Peter Swann | 676 | 24.9 | New |
| Conservative | Vivian Hall | 261 | 9.6 | New |
| Green | Earl Terris | 107 | 3.9 | −5.0 |
| Majority | | 990 | 36.4 | +25.3 |
| Rejected ballots | | 7 | 0.3 | -1.0 |
| Turnout | | 2717 | 49.3 | +0.4 |
| Registered electors | | 5,508 | | |
| Liberal Democrats hold | | | | |
