= Altarnun (electoral division) =

Former electoral division of Cornwall in the UK

- Former ward Cornwall Council
- Boundary of Altarnun in Cornwall from 2013-2021.
- County: Cornwall

2013–2021
- Number of councillors: One
- Replaced by: Altarnun and Stoke Climsland
- Created from: Altarnun

2009–2013
- Number of councillors: One
- Replaced by: Altarnun
- Created from: Council created

Altarnun (Cornish: Alternonn) was an electoral division of Cornwall in the United Kingdom which returned one member to sit on Cornwall Council between 2009 and 2021. It was abolished at the 2021 local elections, being succeeded by Altarnun and Stoke Climsland.

== Councillors ==
Election	Member	Party
2009	Philip Parsons	Conservative
2013	Vivian Hall	Conservative
2017	Adrian Parsons	Liberal Democrats
2021	Seat abolished	

== Extent ==
Altarnun represented the villages of Laneast, Altarnun, Fivelanes, Polyphant, Lewannick, Coad's Green, North Hill, Middlewood and Bathpool, and the hamlets of Badgall, Bowithick, Bolventor, South Carne, Treween, Trewint, Trevadlock, Trenhorne, Congdon's Shop, Illand, Newtown, Trebartha, Berriowbridge and Penhole. The division was affected by boundary changes at the 2013 election. From 2009 to 2013, the division covered 10,968 hectares in total; after the boundary changes in 2013, it covered 11,695 hectares.

== Election results ==
=== 2017 election ===
2017 election: Altarnun
Party	Candidate	Votes	%	±%
Liberal Democrats	Adrian Parsons	694	50.1	
Conservative	Peter Hall	562	40.5	
Labour	Rosalyn May	129	9.3	
Majority		132	9.5	
Rejected ballots		1	0.1	
Turnout		1386	52.5	
Liberal Democrats gain from Conservative		Swing		

=== 2013 election ===
2013 election: Altarnun
Party	Candidate	Votes	%	±%
Conservative	Vivian Hall	389	36.9	
UKIP	John Knights	309	29.3	
Liberal Democrats	Sasha Gillard-Loft	229	21.7	
Labour	Geoff Hale	111	10.5	
Majority		80	7.6	
Rejected ballots		17	1.6	
Turnout		1055	40.2	
Conservative hold		Swing		

=== 2009 election ===
2009 election: Altarnun
Party	Candidate	Votes	%	±%
Conservative	Philip Parsons	639	40.3	
Independent	David Eno	559	35.3	
Liberal Democrats	Ken Scoble	375	23.7	
Majority		80	5.1	
Rejected ballots		11	0.7	
Turnout		1584	49.5	
Conservative win (new seat)				
