= Stokeclimsland (electoral division) =

Former electoral division of Cornwall in the UK

- Former ward Cornwall Council
- Boundary of Stokeclimsland in Cornwall from 2013-2021.
- County: Cornwall

2013–2021
- Number of councillors: One
- Replaced by: Altarnun and Stoke Climsland
- Created from: Stokeclimsland

2009–2013
- Number of councillors: One
- Replaced by: Stokeclimsland
- Created from: Council created

Stokeclimsland (Cornish: Tredirklym) was an electoral division of Cornwall in the United Kingdom which returned one member to sit on Cornwall Council between 2009 and 2021. It was abolished at the 2021 local elections, being succeeded by Altarnun and Stoke Climsland.

== Councillors ==
Election	Member	Party
2009	Neil Burden	Independent
2013	Neil Burden	Independent
2017	Neil Burden	Independent
2021	Seat abolished	

== Extent ==
Stokeclimsland represented the very west of the town of Launceston, the villages of South Petherwin, Lawhitton, Treburley, and Stoke Climsland, and the hamlets of Trewen, Piper's Pool, Trenault, Daw's House, Little Comfort, Larrick, Trebullett, Trekenner, Rezare, Woodabridge, Venterdon, Pempwell, Tutwell, Luckett, and Old Mill. The village of Tregadillett was shared with Launceston North and North Petherwin division, and the village of Bray Shop was shared with Lynher division. The division was nominally abolished during boundary changes at the 2013 election, but this had little effect on the ward. From 2009 to 2013, the division covered 9,355 hectares in total; after the boundary changes in 2013, it covered 8874 hectares.

== Election results ==
=== 2017 election ===
2017 election: Stokeclimsland
Party	Candidate	Votes	%	±%
Independent	Neil Burden	1,015	74.4	
Liberal Democrats	Paul Mannix	219	16.0	
Labour	Carl Bradley-Hughes	112	8.2	
Majority		796	58.3	
Rejected ballots		19	1.4	
Turnout		1365	44.3	
Independent hold		Swing		

=== 2013 election ===
2013 election: Stokeclimsland
Party	Candidate	Votes	%	±%
Independent	Neil Burden	810	61.7	
UKIP	Antonia Willis	272	20.7	
Conservative	John Phillips	124	9.4	
Liberal Democrats	Wayne Gostling	100	7.6	
Majority		538	41.0	
Rejected ballots		7	0.5	
Turnout		1313	42.8	
Independent hold		Swing		

=== 2009 election ===
2009 election: Stokeclimsland
Party	Candidate	Votes	%	±%
Independent	Neil Burden	906	56.2	
Liberal Democrats	Phil Hutty	360	22.3	
Conservative	Vivian Hall	341	21.2	
Majority		546	33.9	
Rejected ballots		4	0.2	
Turnout		1611	54.7	
Independent win (new seat)				
