= Luckett railway station =

Disused railway station in Luckett, Cornwall

Luckett Boslova

General information
- Location: Luckett, Cornwall; England
- Coordinates: 50.5238°N 4.2802°W
- Grid reference: SX384718
- Platforms: 1

Other information
- Status: Disused

History
- Original company: Plymouth, Devonport and South Western Junction Railway
- Pre-grouping: Plymouth, Devonport and South Western Junction Railway
- Post-grouping: Southern Railway

Key dates
- 2 March 1908: Opened as Stoke Climsland
- 1 October 1909: Name changed to Luckett
- 10 September 1962: Closed to goods
- 7 November 1966: Closed to passengers
Location

Luckett railway station (Cornish: Boslova) served the hamlet of Luckett, Cornwall, England, from 1908 to 1966 on the Callington Branch.

== History ==
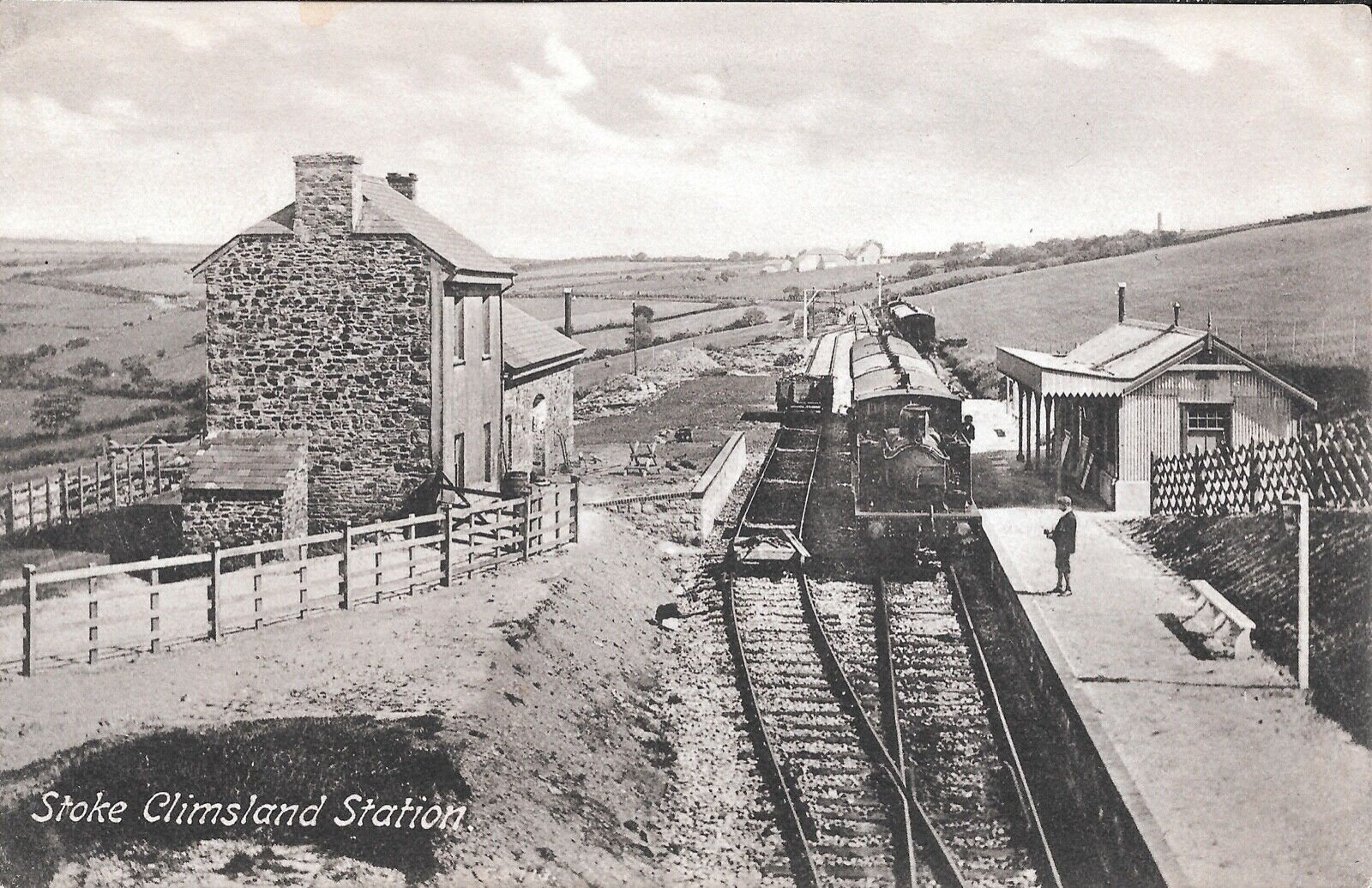
Stoke Climsland railway station

The station was opened as Stoke Climsland on 2 March 1908 by the Plymouth, Devonport and South Western Junction Railway. It was originally Monk's Corner Depot on the East Cornwall Mineral Railway but it changed to a station when the Plymouth, Devonport and South Western Junction Railway took over. Its name was changed to Luckett on 1 October 1909. The station master in 1914 was Mr Leonard Maker who was only 18 years old. It had a carriage shed which closed on 31 March 1923. The station handled parcels, live stock, cattle vans and horse boxes. It had four sidings which were known as Greenhill Siding, Clitter's Siding, Whiterocks Siding and Hingston Down Siding. As was the case with Latchley, Mr A E Lazenbury was responsible for the station from June 1948. The station closed to goods traffic on 10 September 1962. It became unstaffed on 7 March 1966 and closed to passengers 8 months later, on 7 November 1966.

Preceding station	Disused railways	Following station
Seven Stones; Line and station closed	Plymouth, Devonport and South Western Junction Railway; Callington Branch	Callington; Line and station closed
