= Latchley railway station =

Disused railway station in Latchley, Cornwall

Latchley Hallannergh
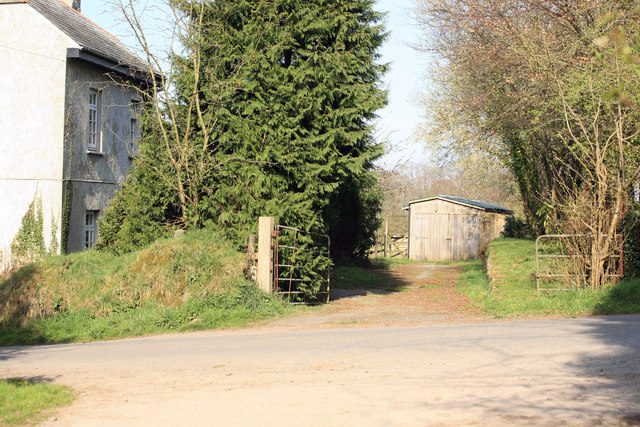
- The site of the station in 2012

General information
- Location: Latchley, Cornwall; England
- Coordinates: 50.5254°N 4.2561°W
- Grid reference: SX401719
- Platforms: 1

Other information
- Status: Disused

History
- Original company: Plymouth, Devonport and South Western Junction Railway
- Pre-grouping: Plymouth, Devonport and South Western Junction Railway
- Post-grouping: Southern Railway

Key dates
- 2 March 1908: Opened
- 7 November 1966: Closed
Location

Latchley railway station (Cornish: Hallannergh) served the village of Latchley, Cornwall, England, from 1908 to 1966 on the Callington Branch.

== History ==
The station was opened on 2 March 1908 by the Plymouth, Devonport and South Western Junction Railway. It was built on the former site of Cox's Park Depot of the East Cornwall Mineral Railway. When the station master was removed in 1936, the station became an unstaffed halt. The station master of Callington, Mr A E Lazenbury, was responsible for this station from June 1948. It had a siding which was worked by a ground frame. Freight trains used this but it was removed in 1949. The 1938 and 1956 editions of the handbook of stations and British Rail tickets referred to this station as Latchley Halt. It closed on 7 November 1966.

| Preceding station | Disused railways | Following station |
|---|---|---|
| Chilsworthy; Line and station closed | Plymouth, Devonport and South Western Junction Railway; Callington Branch | Seven Stones; Line and station closed |
