= Chilsworthy railway station =

Disused railway station in Cornwall, England

Coordinates: 50.5261°N 4.2324°W

Chilsworthy Karjyl

General information
- Location: Chilsworthy, Cornwall; England
- Platforms: 1

Other information
- Status: Disused

History
- Original company: Plymouth, Devonport and South Western Junction Railway
- Pre-grouping: Plymouth, Devonport and South Western Junction Railway
- Post-grouping: Southern Railway; British Rail (Southern Region)

Key dates
- 1 June 1909: Opened
- 7 November 1966: Closed
Location

Chilsworthy railway station (Cornish: Karjyl) served the village of Chilsworthy, Cornwall, England, from 1909 to 1966 on the Callington Branch.

== History ==
The station was opened on 1 June 1909 by the Plymouth, Devonport and South Western Junction Railway. It initially had one siding which served Messrs Hill, West lake and Company's Brick and Tile Works. Mr E. S. Tubb, the station master of Calstock, was temporarily responsible for the station in June 1948. It was known as Chilsworthy Halt in the 1938 and 1956 editions of the handbook of stations as well as British Rail tickets. A second siding was added in 1956, which was operated by the Ministry of Defence. The station closed on 7 November 1966.

Preceding station	Disused railways	Following station
Gunnislake; Line and original station closed	Plymouth, Devonport and South Western Junction Railway; Callington Branch	Latchley; Line and station closed
