= Seven Stones railway station =

Disused railway station in Sevenstones, Cornwall

Seven Stones

General information
- Location: Sevenstones, Cornwall; England
- Platforms: 1

Other information
- Status: Disused

History
- Original company: Plymouth, Devonport and South Western Junction Railway
- Pre-grouping: Plymouth, Devonport and South Western Junction Railway

Key dates
- 16 June 1910: Opened
- September 1917: Closed

Seven Stones railway station served Phoenix Park Pleasure Ground in the neighbourhood of Sevenstones, Cornwall, England, from 1910 to 1917 on the Callington Branch.

== History ==
The station was opened on 16 June 1910 by the Plymouth, Devonport and South Western Junction Railway. It had a siding which would have served Phoenix Works, although this closed in 1883. The station was only used for parties at the nearby Phoenix Park Pleasure Ground and was a request stop. It was regularly used until 1914 but it last appeared in the September 1917 timetable, although it was still mentioned in the 1938 edition of the handbook of stations as accepting passengers and parcels. It was last mentioned in this in 1944.

Preceding station	Disused railways	Following station
Latchley; Line and station closed	Plymouth, Devonport and South Western Junction Railway; Callington Branch	Luckett; Line and station closed
