= Judith Jolly, Baroness Jolly =

British educator and politician (born 1951)

The Right Honourable The Baroness Jolly
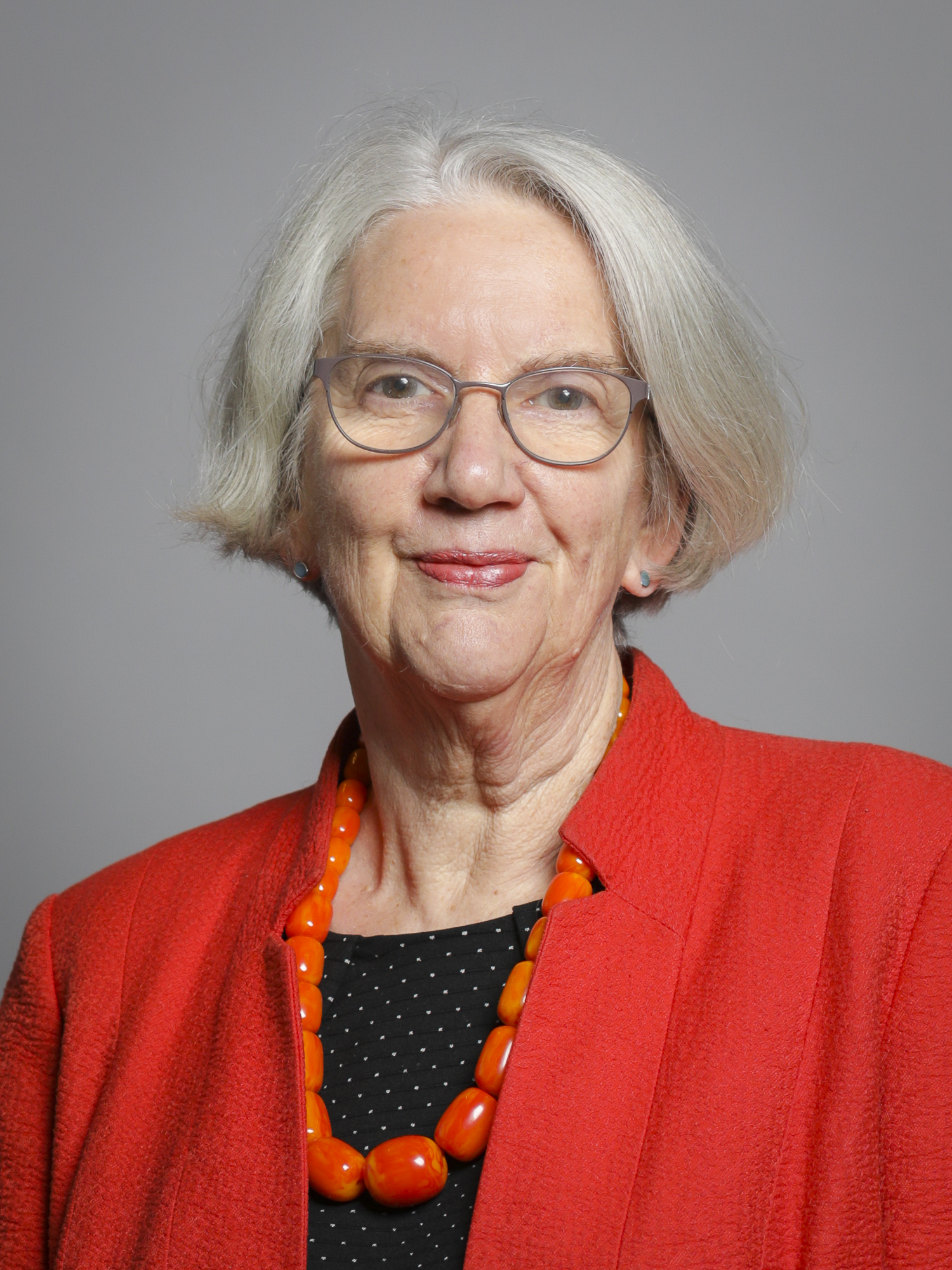
- Official portrait, 2019

Liberal Democrats Spokesperson for Health
- In office 12 October 2017 – 21 August 2019
- Leader: Vince Cable; Jo Swinson
- Preceded by: Norman Lamb
- Succeeded by: Vince Cable (Health and Social Care)

Liberal Democrats Spokesperson for Defence
- In office 16 July 2015 – 12 October 2017
- Leader: Tim Farron; Vince Cable
- Preceded by: Nick Harvey
- Succeeded by: The Lord Campbell of Pittenweem

Baroness-in-Waiting Government Whip
- In office 7 October 2013 – 8 May 2015
- Prime Minister: David Cameron
- Preceded by: The Baroness Garden of Frognal
- Succeeded by: The Baroness Evans of Bowes Park

Member of the House of Lords
- Lord Temporal
- Life peerage 24 December 2010 – 31 July 2024

Personal details
- Born: 27 April 1951 (age 74) Leamington Spa, England
- Party: Liberal Democrats
- Education: University of Leeds; University of Nottingham

Judith Anne Jolly, Baroness Jolly (born 27 April 1951), is a Liberal Democrat life peer. She was raised to the peerage in 2010 and was introduced to the House of Lords in January 2011. Her maiden speech was made within a week on health issues and she immediately became involved in briefings on the Health and Social Care Bill.

== Memberships ==
She was a trustee of Help Musicians UK, an organisation which offers practical, positive support to emerging, professional and retired musicians - whatever the genre and a founder member of FLEX, Focus on Labour Exploitation.

She chaired the Specialised Healthcare Alliance for two years until October 2013. This is a member organisation which campaigns for those with rare or complex diseases. She has worked with Think Global, a charity that works to educate and engage the UK public on global issues; she is especially interested in the regions of North Africa and the Middle East.

In January 2016 she was appointed as Chair of Hft, a charity which supports adults with a learning disability. Her first task was to work on governance within the organisation, and when she left in March 2020 the Council was diverse in age, BAME, gender, and had all the skills a modern charity needs.

In 2019, Baroness Jolly joined the RoSPA Royal Society for the Prevention of Accidents presidential team, joining up with Lord Bill Mckenzie of Luton and Lord Bill Jordan of Bournville, whilst taking the place of The Lord Brougham and Vaux CBE, who stood down last year. Baroness Jolly has previously often spoken in favour of accident prevention during debates in the House of Lords. RoSPA's chief executive Errol Taylor said: " Having seen Judith speak so passionately and eloquently about the value of accident prevention in the Upper House, it was immediately clear that she would be an excellent advocate for RoSPA's vision for life, free from serious accidental injury. I'm thrilled that she has decided to accept our invitation to join RoSPA's presidential team, and I look forward to working with her on furthering RoSPA's good work."

== Biography ==
Judith was born in 1951 in Leamington Spa and went to The King's High School for Girls in Warwick. She graduated from the University of Leeds with a degree in Control Engineering, and subsequently attended the University of Nottingham, where she studied mathematics to become a teacher.

In the 1990s she lived for three years in Oman, while her husband was on loan service to the Royal Navy of Oman. Since then, she has an active interest in issues of the Arabian Gulf region. During that time she worked in the British Council as a teacher of English as a foreign language and as a mentor for students who wanted to obtain an National Vocational Qualification.

When she returned from Oman, she became chief of staff for Robin Teverson, the Member of the European Parliament for Cornwall and West Plymouth, now Lord Teverson. In 1997 she was an agent for Paul Tyler's general election campaign.

She has been on the boards of the Citizens Advice Bureau, Credit Union, regeneration organisations and a member of the Diocesan Synod.

She worked for Macmillan Cancer Support as a fundraiser for three years and learnt much about the provision of services by the voluntary sector in general and services for those whose lives are affected by cancer in particular: in that time with her team, she raised over three million pounds. She and her husband have two sons, Andrew and Stephen.

On 24 December 2010, she was created a life peer taking the title Baroness Jolly, of Congdon's Shop in the County of Cornwall. When interviewed about her intentions for the Lords upon receiving her peerage, she mentioned her desire for a fully elected second chamber.

In March 2011, she took on the role of co-chair of the Health and Social Care Team in the coalition. In October 2013, she became a government whip with responsibilities for Health, Defence, Culture Media & Sport, and Equalities.

Between November 2012 and March 2013, Jolly sat on the Draft Care and Support Bill Committee.

After the General Election of 2015, she became party Defence Spokesperson.

During the 2016 United Kingdom European Union membership referendum, she campaigned to remain in the EU.

On 12 October 2017, she became the Health Spokesperson for the Liberal Democrats in the House of Lords, and stood down in January 2020.

Jolly retired from the House of Lords on 31 July 2024.
