= St Mary's Church, Penzance =

Church in Cornwall, England

St Mary’s Church, Penzance
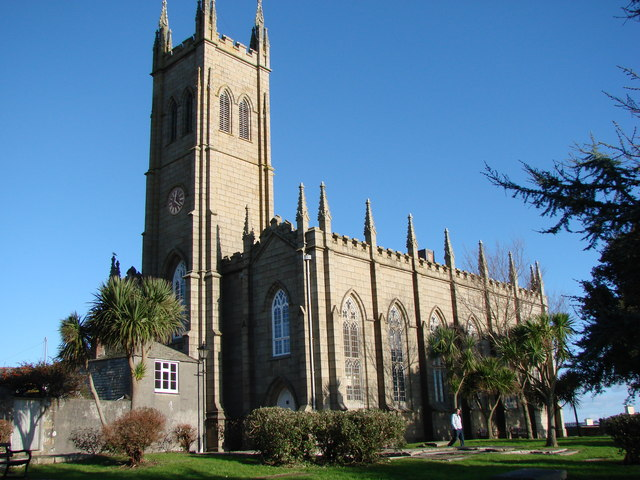
- St Mary’s Church, Penzance
- St Mary’s Church, Penzance
- 50°06′59.82″N 5°32′0.33″W
- OS grid reference: SW 47528 30027
- Location: Penzance
- Country: England
- Denomination: Church of England
- Churchmanship: Broad Church

History
- Dedication: St Mary
- Consecrated: 6 September 1836

Architecture
- Architect: Charles Hutchens
- Groundbreaking: 1832
- Completed: 15 November 1835

Administration
- Province: Province of Canterbury
- Diocese: Diocese of Truro
- Archdeaconry: Cornwall
- Deanery: Penwith
- Parish: Penzance

Listed Building – Grade II*
- Official name: Parish Church of St Mary
- Designated: 29 July 1950
- Reference no.: 1220507

St Mary's Church, Penzance is a Grade II* listed parish church in the Church of England in Penzance, Cornwall.

== History ==
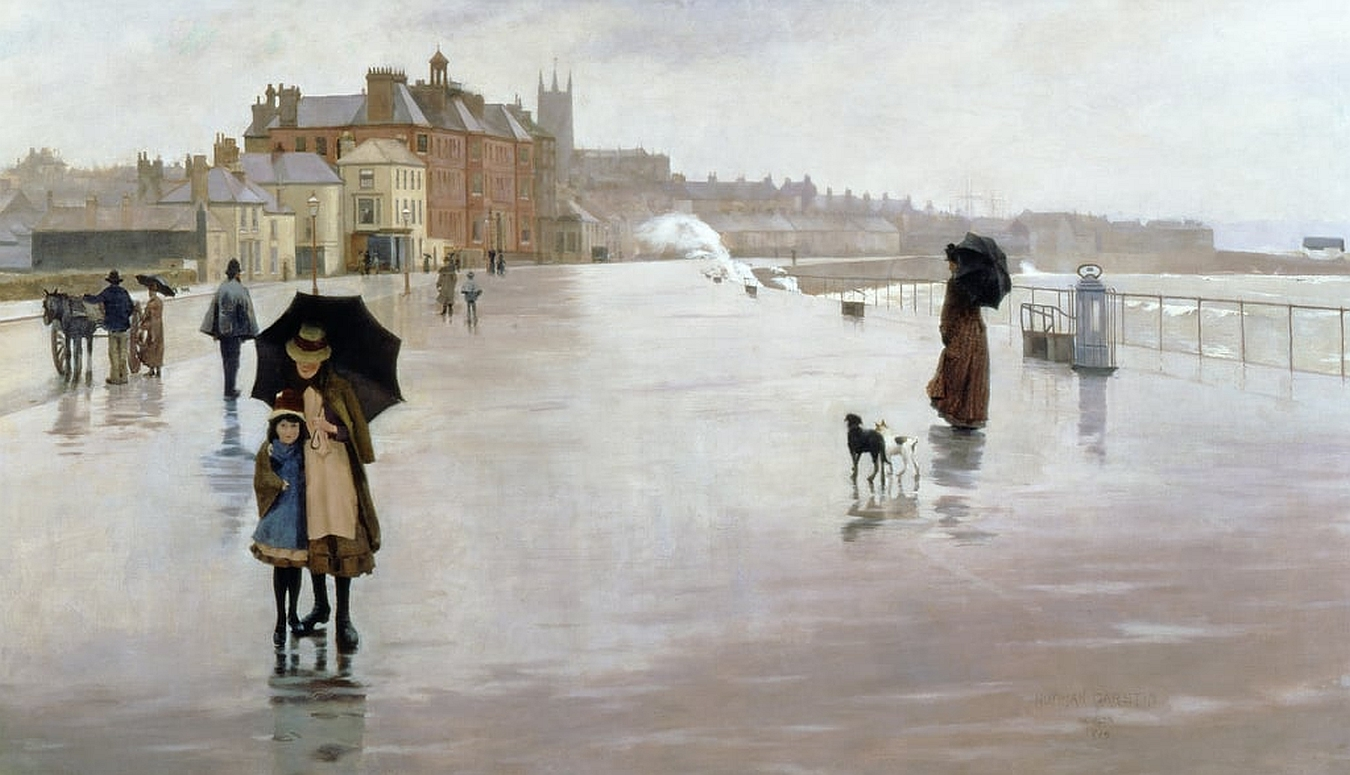
The church seen in Norman Garstin's "The Rain it Raineth Every Day" (1889)

The site as a place of worship dates from at least the fourteenth century, but was a chapel to the parish of Madron and first licensed in 1321. The chapel was spared during the Spanish raid in August 1595 because Mass had been celebrated, previously. Despite enlargements in 1662 to 1672, and 1782 it was severely overcrowded by 1824. At that time it served a population of circa 7000 and was still a chapel of ease to Madron, two miles inland.

The Reverend Thomas Vyvyan made arrangements to replace it with a new church designed by Charles Hutchens. The Clerk of Works was John Pope Vibert. £16,000 was raised, mainly from the church's own communion for the new building. A further £800 was raised for the organ, £800 for the bells and £300 for the carillon. The rebuilt church was consecrated by the Bishop of Exeter, Henry Phillpotts, on 6 September 1836. A separate parish of Penzance was created in 1871. The churchyard was extended on the southern side in 1883.

A gift of seventeen aloes by Mr Dorrien-Smith of Tresco, Isles of Scilly were planted in the churchyard in 1886.

Arson destroyed the interior of the church in April 1985 and two further arson attempts occurred in November 2018.

== Bells ==
One of the bells from the previous church was installed in the temporary belfry of St John's Church in 1885. It cost £12 18s 9d when first installed in the steeple of St Mary's in 1667.

The first bell in the present church was inscribed ″PEACE AND GOOD NEIGHBOURHOOD, 1713 JP″ and was moved to St John's Hall in 1865 for use as a fire-bell. Eight new bells were installed that year at a cost of £950. Their size (diameter at mouth), weight and inscriptions are,

1. 30 inches (760 mm); 6cwt 3qrs 4lbs; ″PEACE AND GOOD NEIGHBOURHOOD A.D. 1865; TAYLOR AND CO., FOUNDERS″,
2. 30 inches (760 mm); 7cwt 0qrs 10lbs; ″TAYLOR AND CO., FOUNDERS, LOUGHBOROUGH A.D. 1835″,
3. 34 inches (860 mm); 8cwt 0qrs 10lbs; ″THE GIFT OF PHILIP HEDGELAND M.A., JAMES ALDRINGE DEVENISH, ASSISTANT CURATE, WALTER EDMUNDS, JUN., CHAPELWARDEN, SAMUEL YORK, SIDESMAN A.D. 1865, TAYLOR AND CO., FOUNDERS, LOUGHBOROUGH″,
4. 30 inches (760 mm); 8cwt 2qrs 10lbs; ″TAYLOR AND CO., FOUNDERS, LOUGHBOROUGH A.D., 1865″,
5. 38.5 inches (980 mm); 10cwt 1qrs 22lbs; ″THE GIFT OF CAROLINE AND ELIZABETH CATHERINE THOMAS CARNE A.D.1865″,
6. 40 inches (1,000 mm); 11cwt 1qrs 3lbs; ″TAYLOR AND CO., A.D. 1865″,
7. 44 inches (1,100 mm); 14cwt 2qrs 17lbs; ″THE GIFT OF THE CORPORATION. FRANCIS BOASE, MAYOR, A.D., 1865, J. TAYLOR AND CO., FOUNDERS, LOUGHBOROUGH, LATE OF OXFORD AND BUCKLAND BREWER, DEVON".
8. 50 inches (1,300 mm); 20cwt 2qrs 6lbs; ″BOLITHO 1865. J TAYLOR AND CO., FOUNDERS, LOUGHBOROUGH, LEICESTERSHIRE″.

A carillon, costing about £300 and paid for by public subscription, was installed as a memorial to the town clerk and ornithologist, Edward Hearle Rodd. The first to be erected in Cornwall, it was completed by Gillett, Bland & Co on 10 November 1880 and first played at 8.00 pm on Sunday, 28 November 1880. The carillon played fourteen tunes and a tune was played for two weeks, every four hours at 8 am, noon, 4 and 8 pm, midnight and 4 am. The carillon had two barrels and two hammers for each of the bells. The hammers did not interfere with the normal ringing of the eight bells by bell-ringers.

	Barrel No 1
Sunday	The Church's one Foundation
Monday	Barbara Allen
Tuesday	Home, sweet home
Wednesday	The Conquering Kings
Thursday	The last rose of Summer
Friday	London new
Saturday	Sun of my soul

	Barrel No 2
Sunday	Songs of Praise
Monday	Blue bells of Scotland
Tuesday	Those evening bells
Wednesday	The first Nowell
Thursday	Bedford
Friday	Tallis
Saturday	Rousean's dream

== Organ ==
The organ contains casework dating from 1676 originally located in St Mary's Church, Oxford. The organ is by J. W. Walker & Sons Ltd and was moved here from Oxford in 1949. A specification of the organ can be found on the National Pipe Organ Register.
