= Rezare =

Coordinates: 50.575°N 4.316°W

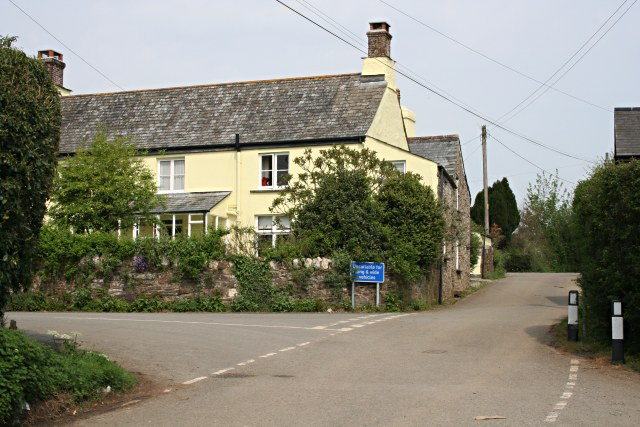
- Rezare

- Location within Cornwall
- OS grid reference: SX361776
- Unitary authority: Cornwall
- Ceremonial county: Cornwall
- Region: South West
- Country: England
- Sovereign state: United Kingdom

Rezare is a hamlet in east Cornwall, England. It is one mile east of Treburley on a minor road from Lewannick to Stoke Climsland.

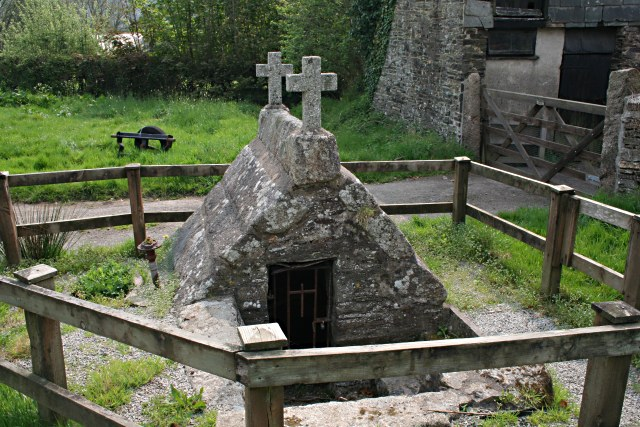
An old well on Rezare green
