= Callington railway station =

Disused railway station in Cornwall, England

Coordinates: 50.51958°N 4.31423°W

Callington Kelliwik
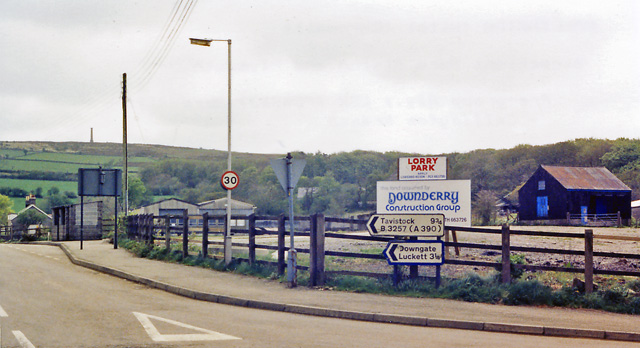
- The site of Callington Station, near to Kelly Bray, Cornwall 2 May 1987

General information
- Location: Callington, Cornwall; England
- Platforms: 1

Other information
- Status: Disused

History
- Original company: Plymouth, Devonport and South Western Junction Railway
- Pre-grouping: Plymouth, Devonport and South Western Junction Railway
- Post-grouping: Southern Railway

Key dates
- 2 March 1908: opened as Callington Road
- 1 November 1909: renamed Callington for Stoke Climsland
- 7 Nov. 1966: Closed
Location

Callington railway station (Cornish: Kelliwik) was a railway station in the village of Kelly Bray, one mile (1.6 km) north of the centre of the small town of Callington, Cornwall. It was the terminus of a branch line from Bere Alston, built by the Plymouth, Devonport and South Western Junction Railway, but operated by the London and South Western Railway. The station closed in 1966. The Tamar Valley Line still operates services from Bere Alston, with services terminating at Gunnislake railway station, 5 miles (8 km) to the east of Callington.

The now-closed section of line north of Gunnislake was remote from local communities and provided a relatively slow journey compared with the competing roads, which limited its use. (Callington had good bus services to Saltash and Plymouth, but the landscape denied that to Gunnislake.) Ironically, the alignment and gradients of that part of the line were better than the surviving section south of Gunnislake. After closure the station was demolished and the site is now occupied by industrial units.

Preceding station	Disused railways	Following station
Luckett; Line and station closed	Plymouth, Devonport and South Western Junction Railway; Callington Branch	Terminus
