= Tutwell =

Coordinates: 50°33′27″N 4°16′49″W

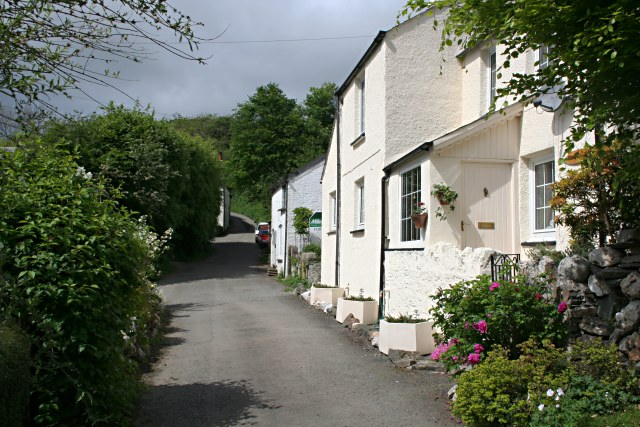
Tutwell

Tutwell is a hamlet in the Tamar Valley east of Stoke Climsland, Cornwall, England, United Kingdom.
