= Edward Hearle Rodd =

English solicitor and ornithologist (1810–1880)

- Born: 17 March 1810; St Just in Roseland, Cornwall
- Died: 25 January 1880 (aged 69); Penzance, Cornwall
- Scientific career
- Fields: Ornithology, solicitor

Edward Hearle Rodd (17 March 1810 – 25 January 1880), ornithologist, born at the vicarage of St Just in Roseland, Cornwall, England on 17 March 1810, was the third son of Edward Rodd, D.D. (1768–1842), by his wife Harriet, (1779–1855) daughter of Charles Rashleigh, of Duporth, Cornwall.

== Life ==
He was educated at Ottery St Mary school, and trained for the law, being admitted to practise as a solicitor in Trinity term 1832. In January 1833 he settled at Penzance, where he entered into partnership with George Dennis John. On John's death in 1847 Messrs John and Rodd became John, Rodd and Darke and after the latter's death the firm became Rodd & Cornish. He had also held many official posts in the town. He was town clerk from 1847, clerk to the local board from 1849, clerk to the Board of Guardians from the passing of the Poor Law Amendment Act 1834, and superintendent registrar, besides being head distributor of stamps in Cornwall from 1844 to 1867. Rodd retired about 1878 leaving the practice to Thomas Cornish.

He died unmarried at his home, 4 South Parade, Penzance on 25 January 1880, and was buried in St Clare Cemetery, between Penzance and Heamoor.

A carillon, costing about £300 and paid for by public subscription, was installed in St Mary's Church as a memorial to Rodd. The first to be erected in Cornwall, it was completed by Gillett, Bland & Co on 10 November 1880 and plays fourteen tunes. A tune was played for two weeks, every four hours at 8 am, noon, 4 and 8 pm, midnight and 4 am. The carillon uses the eight bells, which were installed in 1865 for £950.

== Ornithological studies ==
Rodd was an ardent ornithologist, and especially interested in the question of migration. He studied minutely the avifauna of Cornwall, and it was entirely due to his exertion that many a rare bird was rescued from oblivion, while several species were added by him to the list of British birds. He contributed upwards of twenty papers on ornithological matters to The Zoologist, the Ibis, and the Journal of the Royal Institution of Cornwall from 1843 onwards. His collection of at least forty-five cases with 270 specimens, mostly from Cornwall, passed to his nephew Francis R Rodd, at Trebartha Hall, Launceston. All were lost when Trebartha was destroyed by fire in 1949.

== Books ==
- A List of British Birds as a Guide to the Ornithology of Cornwall, particularly in the Land's End district: with remarks on the capture, habits, &c., of some of the rarer species, & species new to Britain and an appendix with a list of some of the rarer and interesting British birds observed at Scilly since 1843. London: Simpkin, Marshall; Penzance: W. Cornish, 1864; 2nd edit. 1869
- The Birds of Cornwall and the Scilly Islands; edited by James Harting, London: Trübner, 1880 (includes "brief memoir")

== Sources ==
- Memoir by J E Harting, prefixed to Birds of Cornwall
- Boase and Courtney's Bibliotheca Cornubiensis; ii. p. 580, and Suppl. p. 1327
- Information kindly supplied by his nephew, F R Rodd, of Trebartha Hall, Launceston
- British Museum Catalogue
- Royal Society Catalogue

Attribution

This article incorporates text from a publication now in the public domain: "Rodd, Edward Hearle". Dictionary of National Biography. London: Smith, Elder & Co. 1885–1900.
