= Tredaule =

Hamlet in Cornwall, England

Coordinates: 50.603°N 4.497°W

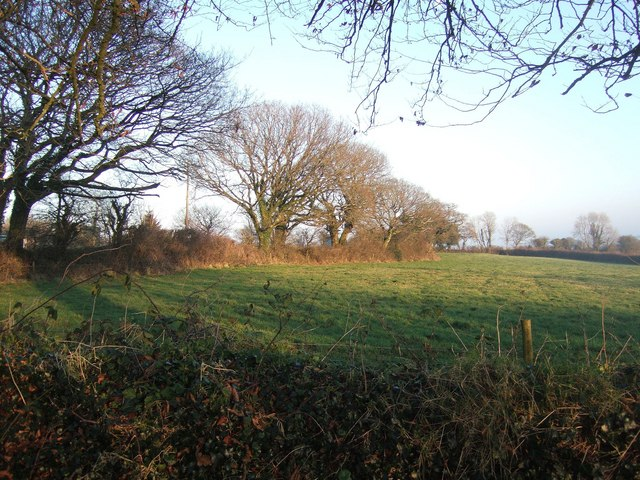
- A field near Tredaule

- Location within Cornwall
- OS grid reference: SX234811
- Unitary authority: Cornwall
- Ceremonial county: Cornwall
- Region: South West
- Country: England
- Sovereign state: United Kingdom

Tredaule is a hamlet in Cornwall, England, United Kingdom. It is one mile east of Altarnun.

The manor of Tredaule was recorded in the Domesday Book (1086) when it was held by Nigel from Robert, Count of Mortain. There was one hide of land and land for 8 ploughs. There were 6 ploughs, 8 serfs, 7 villeins, 20 smallholders, 1 acre of meadow, 1 acre of woodland, 4 square leagues of pasture, 3 unbroken mares, 12 pigs, 10 cattle and 100 sheep. The value of the manor was £2 sterling though it had formerly been worth £3.
