= Focus on Labour Exploitation =

UK-based charity

Focus on Labour Exploitation (FLEX)
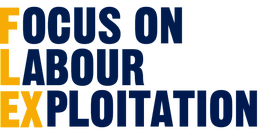
- Founded: 2013; 13 years ago
- Type: Non-profit, non-governmental organization (NGO), charity
- Headquarters: London, United Kingdom
- Region served: Europe
- Services: Policy, research, advocacy
- Fields: human trafficking, exploitation of labour, human migration
- Key people: Caroline Robinson (Policy Director), Claire Falconer (Legal Director)
- Website: www.labourexploitation.org

Focus on Labour Exploitation (FLEX) is a British charity working to end human trafficking for labour exploitation. FLEX is based in London and conducts research, advocacy and awareness-raising in order to prevent labour abuses, protect the rights of trafficked persons and promote best practice responses to human trafficking for labour exploitation.

== History ==
FLEX was founded in 2013 by Caroline Robinson and Claire Falconer. In 2015 FLEX developed the Labour Exploitation Accountability Hub, a free online resource which provides legal information on corporate and government accountability for human trafficking and labour exploitation worldwide.
