= Pempwell =

Hamlet in Cornwall, England

Coordinates: 50.552°N 4.299°W

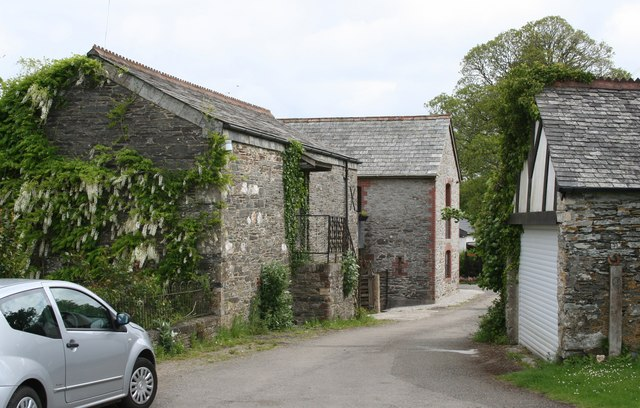
Converted barns at Pempwell

Pempwell is a hamlet near Stoke Climsland in Cornwall, England, UK.
