= South Carne =

Hamlet in Cornwall, England

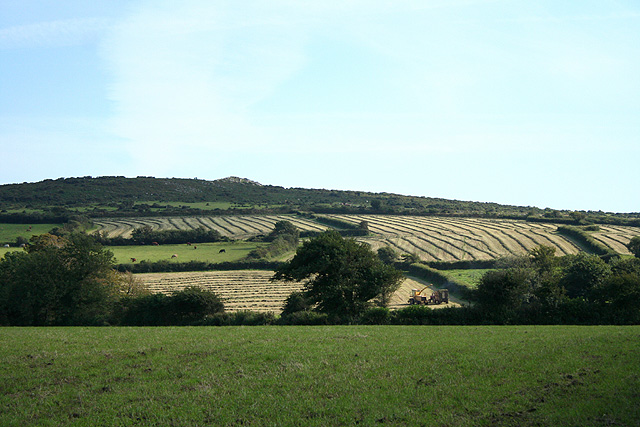
Landscape near South Carne

South Carne is a hamlet west of Altarnun in Cornwall, England, United Kingdom.
