= Venterdon =

Coordinates: 50.550°N 4.321°W

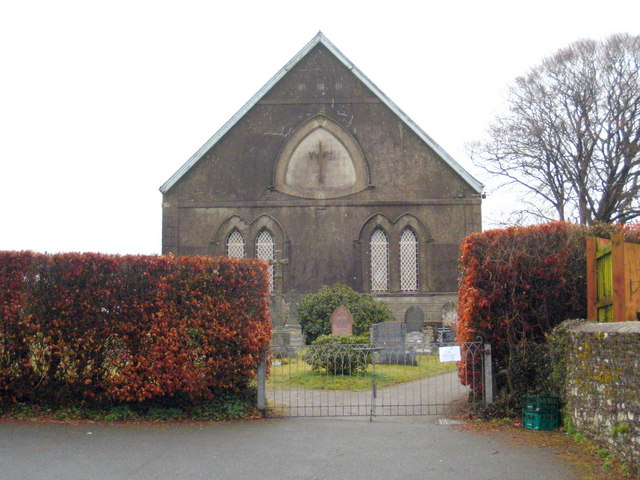
- Venterdon Methodist Chapel

- Location within Cornwall
- OS grid reference: SX357748
- Unitary authority: Cornwall
- Ceremonial county: Cornwall
- Region: South West
- Country: England
- Sovereign state: United Kingdom

Venterdon is a hamlet in Cornwall, England. It is a quarter of a mile from Stoke Climsland.
