= Old Mill, Cornwall =

Hamlet in Cornwall, England

Coordinates: 50°32′31″N 4°18′22″W

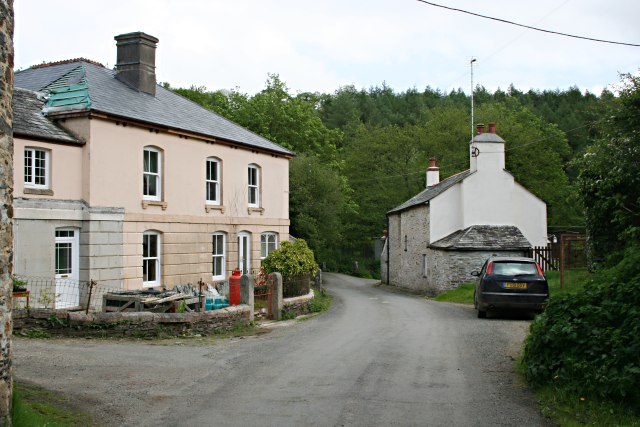

Old Mill is a hamlet in the civil parish of Stokeclimsland, Cornwall, England.
