= Badgall =

Hamlet in Cornwall, England

Coordinates: 50.652°N 4.497°W

Badgall: Cornish: Bosgalla
- Location within Cornwall
- OS grid reference: SX 235 866
- Shire county: Cornwall
- Region: South West
- Country: England
- Sovereign state: United Kingdom
- Post town: Launceston
- Postcode district: PL15 8
- Police: Devon and Cornwall
- Fire: Cornwall
- Ambulance: South Western

Badgall (Cornish: Bosgalla, meaning Kalla's dwelling) is a hamlet in the parish of Laneast, Cornwall, England, United Kingdom. It is situated 6 miles (9 kilometres) north-east of Launceston at grid reference SX 235 866.
