= East Cornwall Mineral Railway =

Railway line in Cornwall, England

Coordinates: 50.503°N 4.316°W

Overview
- Headquarters: Calstock
- Locale: South East Cornwall
- Dates of operation: 1872–1894
- Successor: Plymouth, Devonport and South Western Junction Railway

Technical
- Track gauge: 3 ft 6 in (1,067 mm) (1872–1908); 4 ft 8 1/2 in (1,435 mm) (from 1908)
- Length: 8 mi (13 km)

The East Cornwall Mineral Railway was a 1,067 mm (3 ft 6 in) gauge railway line, opened in 1872 to connect mines and quarries in the Callington and Gunnislake areas in east Cornwall, England, with shipping at Calstock on the River Tamar. The line included a rope-worked incline to descend to the quay at Calstock.

Following the opening of a main line railway at nearby Bere Alston, a connecting line from there to Calstock was opened, and the existing line converted to standard gauge, opening throughout as a passenger line in 1908. When rural lines in the area were closed in the 1960s, a short section of the original ECMR line was retained to keep open a connection from Plymouth to Gunnislake, and that section remains open at the present day.

== Origins ==
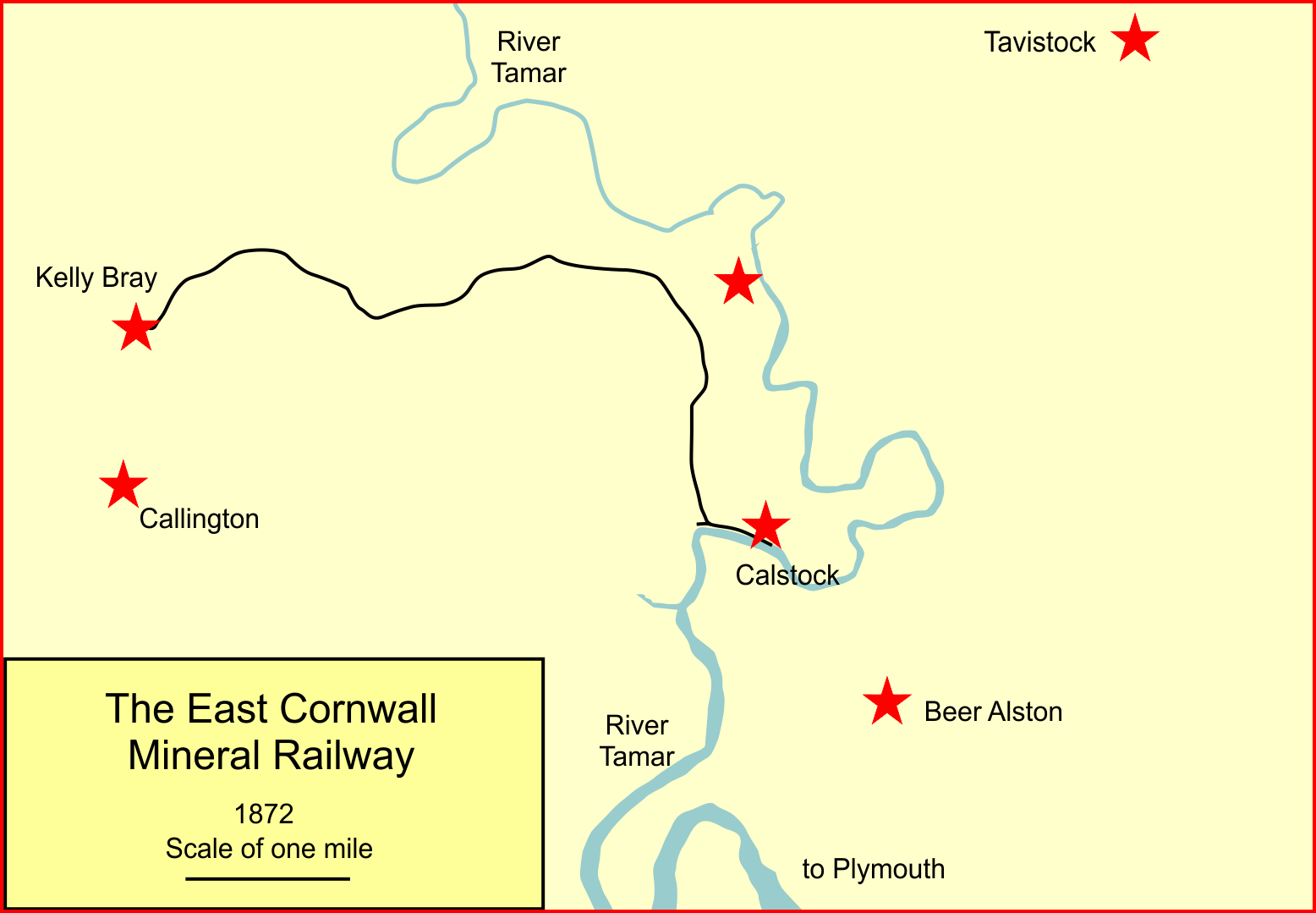
Map of the East Cornwall Mineral Railway

In the middle decades of the 19th century, mineral extraction in the Callington and Gunnislake area of East Cornwall reached a peak. The trade was limited by the difficulty of conveying the products to market: pack horses were used as far as Calstock, where there was a quay on the tidal River Tamar for onward coast-wise shipping transport. The chief mineral was copper ore, with some tin and arsenic also; timber and coal was brought in to serve the mines. Although the Tamar was tidal at Calstock, the passage to the sea was difficult, involving poling the ship past shoal stretches.

Tamar, Kit Hill and Callington Railway Act 1864
- Act of Parliament
- Parliament of the United Kingdom
- Long title: An Act for making a Railway from the River Tamar in the Parish of Calstock to Callington in the County of Cornwall; and for other Purposes.
- Citation: 27 & 28 Vict. c. ccxciv

Dates
- Royal assent: 29 July 1864

Text of statute as originally enacted

Tamar, Kit Hill and Callington Railway Act 1866
- Act of Parliament
- Parliament of the United Kingdom
- Long title: An Act to authorize the Mixed Gauge or the Broad Gauge only upon the Tamar, Kit Hill, and Callington Railway, and Arrangements between the Tamar, Kit Hill and Callington Railway Company and the Saltash and Callington and other Railway Companies; and for other Purposes.
- Citation: 29 & 30 Vict. c. cccxii

Dates
- Royal assent: 30 July 1866

A railway connection was considered to be the solution, and a Tamar, Kit Hill and Callington Railway Company Limited was formed in 1864. The company was to build a standard gauge line from Callington to Kelly Quay at Calstock, with an inclined plane to descend to the quayside there. The company obtained parliamentary authority in the Tamar, Kit Hill and Callington Railway Act 1864 (27 & 28 Vict. c. ccxciv) on 29 July 1864. Construction was soon under way. In the following year, a broad gauge Saltash and Callington Railway was authorised by the Saltash and Callington Railway Act 1865 (28 & 29 Vict. c. ccclxxiii), so in 1866 the Kit Hill company obtained authority in the Tamar, Kit Hill and Callington Railway Act 1866 (29 & 30 Vict. c. cccxii) to build on the broad gauge instead, so as to connect with the Saltash company. But that year there was a financial crash, and although much work had been done on the Kit Hill line, nothing further was done on either route.

Callington and Calstock Railway Act 1869
- Act of Parliament
- Parliament of the United Kingdom
- Long title: An Act for making a Railway from Callington to Calstock in the county of Cornwall, and for other purposes.
- Citation: 32 & 33 Vict. c. clii

Dates
- Royal assent: 9 August 1869

Text of statute as originally enacted

Foreign competition in mineral extraction worsened the position of the local mines, and a Callington and Calstock Railway was formed, obtaining parliamentary authority in the Callington and Calstock Railway Act 1869 (32 & 33 Vict. c. clii) on 9 August 1869. This was to have a capital of £60,000, with borrowing powers of £20,000, and adopt the abandoned works of the Kit Hill company. The line was to be nearly 8 miles (13 km) long, including short lengths on the quay at Calstock and the incline. Passenger traffic was not authorised. Purchase of the quay at Calstock, and improvements to it, were included in the authorised powers.

East Cornwall Mineral Railway (Deviation) Act 1871
- Act of Parliament
- Parliament of the United Kingdom
- Long title: An Act to enable the East Cornwall Mineral Railway Company to divert a portion of their Railway; and for other purposes.
- Citation: 34 & 35 Vict. c. xxxiii

Dates
- Royal assent: 25 May 1871

Text of statute as originally enacted

Construction work proceeded steadily, and the East Cornwall Mineral Railway (Deviation) Act 1871 (34 & 35 Vict. c. xxxiii) of 25 May 1871 authorised a change of name to the East Cornwall Mineral Railway. The line opened for traffic on 7 May 1872. (Note: Cromblehome et al say 8 May 1872)

== Route ==
The line was 7 miles 4 furlongs and 5 chains (12.17 km) long running from Kelly Bray to Calstock. Kelly Bray, about a mile (about 1.5 km) north of Callington, was at an altitude of 640 feet (195 m) above sea level and was the railhead for a considerable agricultural hinterland. The line fell all the way to Calstock except for a short sharp climb. There were public depots (i.e. goods stations) intermediately at Monks Corner (later the site of Luckett station), Cox's Park (later Latchley), and Drakewalls (later Gunnislake). There were numerous sidings connecting with mines and quarries, in particular Kit Hill, Hingston Down, Gunnislake Clitters Mine, Plymouth Depot, Pearson's Quarry (at West of England Siding). The locomotive-operated part of the line ended at Incline Station, where there were sidings for forming trains at the head of the incline.

== Calstock incline and quay ==
The incline at Calstock had been built in 1859 by the Tamar Coal, Manure & General Merchandise Co to bring supplies to mines on the higher ground, and to bring their products down. It was 2,310 feet (704 m) long on a gradient of 1 in 6. It was self-acting, but a stationary steam engine was provided at the top. It was single track with a passing loop halfway, and a three-rail section above it. A two wagon lift was usual, each conveying 3 tons.

When the ECMR line was built, the incline was taken over by the railway company. There is evidence of realignment of the incline: the later route was higher up the hillside and reduced the sharp curve near the bottom. It is likely that this was done at the time of adoption of the incline as part of the ECMR. A 14 hp (9 kW) stationary steam engine was provided by the ECMR. An electric bell system was installed for the operation of the incline, later replaced by a telephone. Two loaded or three empty wagons were moved on the incline at a time.

The ECMR extended the quay at Calstock, and it was 1,359 feet (414 m) long. Horses performed wagon movement on the quay.

== Connection to the main line ==
Navigation on the Tamar was difficult, but when the line opened, the nearest main line railways were the Cornwall Railway at Saltash, and the South Devon and Tavistock Railway, across the Tamar and Tavy rivers. Extension to connect to them was considered, but was impossibly expensive. However, on 25 August 1883 the Plymouth, Devonport and South Western Junction Railway (PD&SWJR) obtained authority in the Plymouth, Devonport and South Western Junction Railway Act 1883 (46 & 47 Vict. c. ccxxx) to build a line from Lydford to Devonport via Tavistock and Bere Alston. (Note: Original spelling.) That line opened on 2 June 1890, and it was to be worked by the London and South Western Railway (LSWR).

The promoters of the PD&SWJR had included in its authorising act the powers to acquire the East Cornwall Mineral Railway, and in its later Plymouth, Devonport and South Western Junction Railway Act 1884 (47 & 48 Vict. c. ccxxxi) of 7 August 1884 these powers were converted to an obligation. Accordingly, the ECMR was "taken over" as from 1 June 1891, although the formalities of the purchase were not completed until 4 January 1894. "Payment was made by the issue of £48,250 in ordinary shares, £12,500 in cash, and a rent charge of £250 per annum".

The Light Railways Act 1896 (59 & 60 Vict. c. 48) was passed in 1896, designed to facilitate the construction of new lines where there was no controversy over routing, and in 1898 the PD&SWJR investigated the possibility of connecting the ECMR line to its own line as a light railway. This proved feasible, and the Bere Alston and Calstock Light Railway Order 1900 was confirmed by the Board of Trade on 12 July 1900; as well as the new line, the order authorised the acquisition of the ECMR line and its operation as a passenger light railway (excepting the incline). The gauge was to remain 1,067 mm (3 ft 6 in). In fact finance was impossible to obtain, and eventually the LSWR was persuaded to guarantee borrowings.

A new company, the Bere Alston and Calstock Railway (BA&CR) as a subsidiary of the PD&SWJR, was set up and a new act of Parliament, the Plymouth, Devonport and South Western Junction Railway Act 1902 (2 Edw. 7. c. xxx) of 23 June 1902, authorised it to build the connecting line and to acquire the East Cornwall line. A further light railway order, the Bere Alston and Calstock Light Railway (Amendment) Order 1905, was made on 12 October 1905 authorising a change of the track gauge to 1,435 mm (4 ft 8 1/2 in) standard gauge. The position now was to be that the Okehampton–Devonport line would be owned by the PD&SWJR and worked by the LSWR, and the Bere Alston to Callington line would be owned by the BA&CR, a subsidiary of the PD&WJR, and worked by the PD&SWJR.

Regauging and some realignment of the ECMR line was undertaken in 1907–1908 but ordinary traffic was only interrupted for two days during the conversion. The new line from Bere Alston to Callington opened to passengers and freight traffic on 2 March 1908. The Bere Alston to Plymouth section of the PD&SWJR was worked by the LSWR but the PD&SWJR worked the branch itself under the management of Colonel Stephens.

The former ECMR line was now operated as part of the branch, although the incline at Calstock was abandoned. The PD&SWJR branch crossed the Tamar on a high viaduct at Calstock where a wagon lift was provided to allow continued access to the quay.

The PD&SWJR remained independent until the 'Grouping' of railways in Great Britain under the Railways Act 1921 when, on 1 January 1923, it became part of the new Southern Railway, (Note: Strictly speaking, for administrative convenience it was absorbed into the LSWR on 11 December 1922.) and later British Railways.

== Closure ==
With the decline in usage of rural railways in the second half of the twentieth century, the viability of the line decreased and it was proposed for closure. However the poor road network around Calstock, and the topographical barrier of the Tamar, resulted in retention of the line from Plymouth to Gunnislake via Bere Alston and Calstock. The short section of original ECMR approaching Gunnislake is therefore still in regular passenger operation. The remainder closed on 5 November 1966.

== Locomotives ==
Number	Builder	Type	Date	Works number	Notes
1	Neilson & Co.	0-4-0ST	1871	1660	May have been scrapped in 1907 but Clinker says it was converted to standard gauge in 1907; it was sold in 1909.
2	Neilson &Co.	0-4-0ST	1871	1661	Converted to a standard gauge 0-4-2ST around 1907. Sold in 1912 and worked on the Selsey Tramway until scrapped in 1927 or 1931

== See also ==
- British industrial narrow gauge railways
- Tamar Valley Line
