= Tolborough =

Hamlet in Cornwall, England

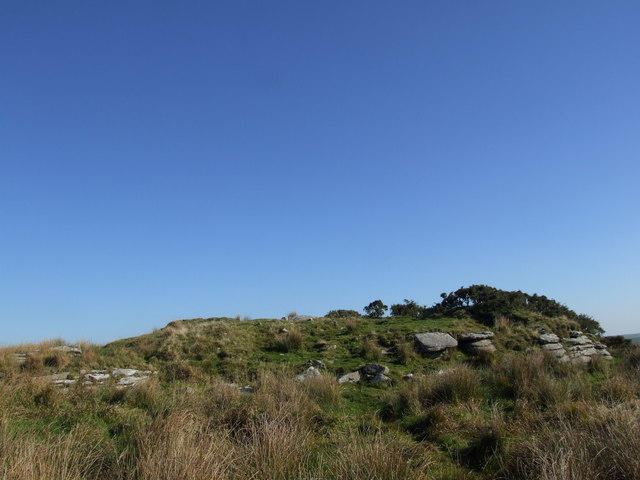
Tolborough Tor

Tolborough is a hamlet north of Bolventor, Cornwall, England, United Kingdom. To the north are Tolborough Downs and Tolborough Tor (1143 ft).
