= Berriowbridge =

Hamlet in Cornwall, England

Coordinates: 50.554°N 04.439°W

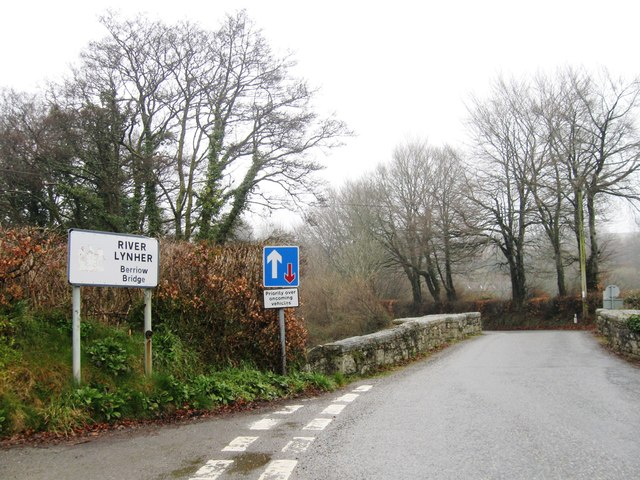
- Berriowbridge Bridge

- Location within Cornwall
- OS grid reference: SX2775
- Shire county: Cornwall
- Region: South West
- Country: England
- Sovereign state: United Kingdom
- Post town: Launceston
- Postcode district: PL15
- Police: Devon and Cornwall
- Fire: Cornwall
- Ambulance: South Western

Berriowbridge is a hamlet in the parish of North Hill in east Cornwall, England, United Kingdom. It is situated in the River Lynher valley on the southeast fringe of Bodmin Moor, about six miles (10 kilometres) south-west of Launceston.

The 16th-century bridge over the River Lynher was widened in 1890 and is a Grade II* listed structure.
