= Trebullett =

Hamlet in Cornwall, England

Coordinates: 50.579°N 4.369°W

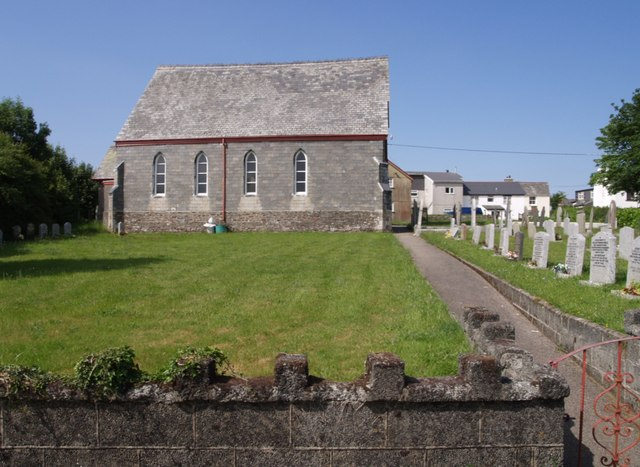
- Trebullett Methodist Church

- Location within Cornwall
- OS grid reference: SX324782
- Unitary authority: Cornwall
- Ceremonial county: Cornwall
- Region: South West
- Country: England
- Sovereign state: United Kingdom

Trebullett is a hamlet in Cornwall, England, United Kingdom. It is about one mile west of Lezant. Another hamlet, Lower Trebullett, is further south.
