= Trevadlock =

Coordinates: 50°35′00″N 4°27′06″W

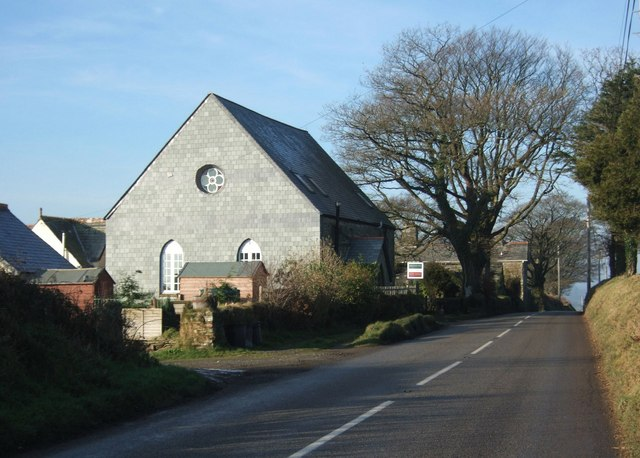
Trevadlock Cross Methodist Chapel

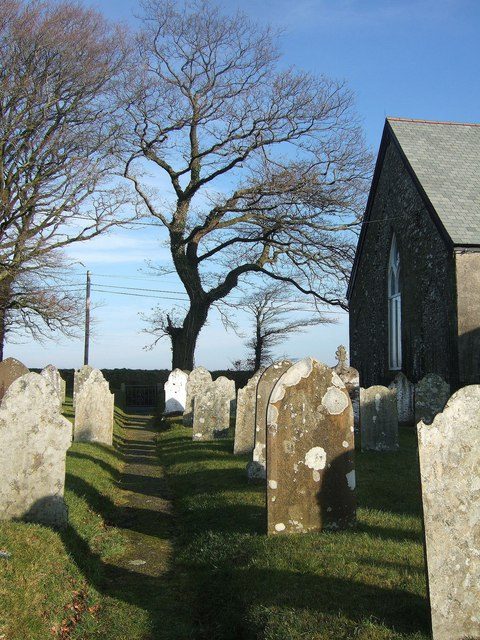
The graveyard of Trevadlock Cross Methodist Chapel

Trevadlock is a hamlet south of Lewannick, Cornwall, United Kingdom. It includes a re-furbished old chapel, old schoolroom and semi-detached cottages.

== Place name history ==
The name Trevadlock has its origins in the Cornish language. It is formed of tre ('homestead, settlement', which can turn to 'trev' when in front of a vowel) + ‘adlock’, a particle of uncertain meaning or origin.
