= Illand =

Hamlet in Cornwall, England

Coordinates: 50.579°N 4.419°W

- Location within Cornwall
- OS grid reference: SX288783
- Civil parish: North Hill
- Unitary authority: Cornwall
- Ceremonial county: Cornwall
- Region: South West
- Country: England
- Sovereign state: United Kingdom
- Post town: Launceston
- Postcode district: PL15 7

Illand is a hamlet in the parish of North Hill, Cornwall, England.
