= Trekenner =

Hamlet in Cornwall, England

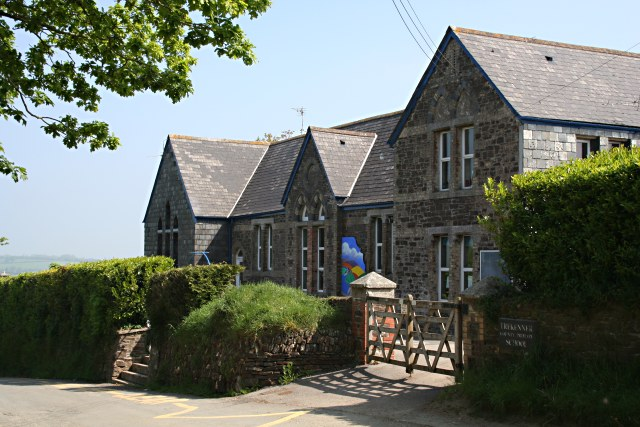
Trekenner Junior School

Trekenner (Cornish: Tregynner) is a hamlet in the parish of Lezant, Cornwall, England, United Kingdom.
