= Trebartha =

Hamlet in Cornwall, England

Coordinates: 50.570°N 4.453°W

- Location within Cornwall
- OS grid reference: SX264774
- Civil parish: North Hill
- Unitary authority: Cornwall
- Ceremonial county: Cornwall
- Region: South West
- Country: England
- Sovereign state: United Kingdom

Trebartha is a hamlet in the civil parish of North Hill, in Cornwall, England, United Kingdom, and in the valley of the River Lynher.

== History ==
The manor of Trebartha was recorded in the Domesday Book (1086) when it was held by Thurstan from Robert, Count of Mortain. There was half a hide of land and land for four ploughs. There were three and a half ploughs, two villeins and six smallholders. The value of the manor was 15 shillings. In 1193 the manor was described as ″this desirable manor...″ and the property of Walter Reynell who was castellan of Launceston Castle. Trebarth passed from the Reynells to the Carews and then to the Spoures. Henrie Spoure (died 1603) was one of the owners and in circa 1700 when Edmond Spoure (married to Mary née Rodd) died, the estate passed to his daughter Mary. She married Renatus Bellott of Bochym and they had one son, who died at the age of 8 in 1712. Mary outlived her husband and married Charles Grylls of Court and, was widowed a second time. Mary than met Captain Francis Rodd (1683 – August 1736), her cousin. In a relationship (but not married, despite rumours) the childless Mary died, leaving Trebartha to her cousin, who was the first Rodd to own Trebartha.

In 1730 Francis Rodd married Allice, daughter of William Sandford of Exeter. Edward Rodd (1768 – 1842) succeeded to Trebartha Hall in 1836 and in 1870 the house was in the residence of Francis Rodd (his son). It was demolished in 1949. In summary, Trebartha was in the possession of the Trebartha family from the 12th to the 15th-century; from the late 15th-century to 1730 it was held by the Spoure family and from 1730 to 1940 by the Rodd family.

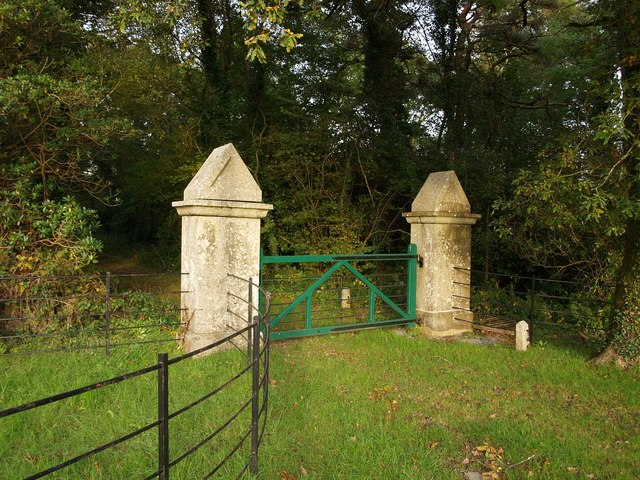
A gateway to the Trebartha Hall estate

The bird collection of Edward Hearle Rodd which contained at least forty-five cases with 270 specimens, mostly from Cornwall, passed to his nephew Francis R Rodd and all were lost when Trebartha was destroyed by fire in 1949.

Arthur Langdon (1896) recorded a Cornish cross in the grounds of Trebartha Hall; it had been found built into the gable of a nearby cottage.
