= Congdon's Shop =

Hamlet in Cornwall, England

Coordinates: 50.57937°N 4.42721°W

Congdon's Shop: Cornish: Shoppa Congdon
- Hamlet
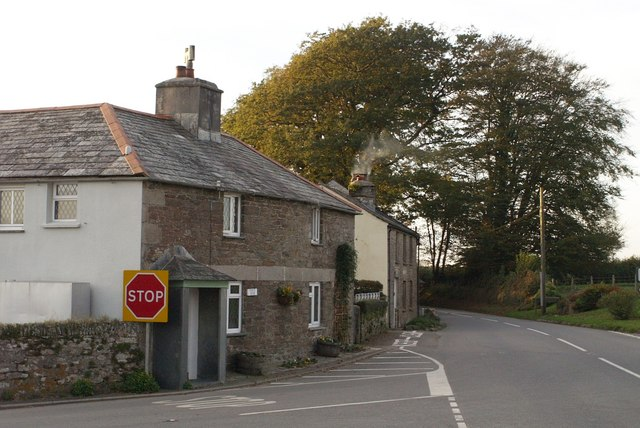

- Location within Cornwall
- Unitary authority: Cornwall
- Region: South West
- Country: England
- Sovereign state: United Kingdom
- Police: Devon and Cornwall
- Fire: Cornwall
- Ambulance: South Western

Congdon's Shop (Cornish: Shoppa Congdon, meaning Congdon's workshop) is a hamlet in the parish of North Hill, Cornwall, England. It is at the junction of the B3254 Launceston to Liskeard road and the B3257 road from Plusha to Callington.

== Notable people ==
- Judith Jolly, Baroness Jolly (Baroness Jolly of Congdon's Shop)
