= Larrick =

Hamlet in Cornwall, England

Coordinates: 50.580°N 4.390°W

Larrick: Cornish: Lannergh
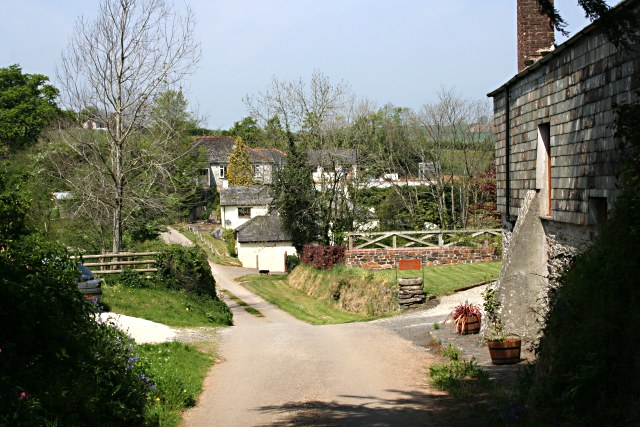
- Larrick

- Location within Cornwall
- OS grid reference: SX309783
- Civil parish: Lezant
- Unitary authority: Cornwall
- Ceremonial county: Cornwall
- Region: South West
- Country: England
- Sovereign state: United Kingdom
- Post town: Launceston
- Postcode district: PL15

Larrick (Cornish: Lannergh) is a hamlet in the parish of Lezant (where the population of the 2011 census was included.), Cornwall, England.
