= Daw's House =

Hamlet in Cornwall, England

Coordinates: 50.621°N 4.384°W

Daw's House: Cornish: Chidaw
- Location within Cornwall
- OS grid reference: SX 314 829
- Civil parish: South Petherwin
- Unitary authority: Cornwall
- Ceremonial county: Cornwall
- Region: South West
- Country: England
- Sovereign state: United Kingdom
- Post town: LAUNCESTON
- Postcode district: PL15
- Dialling code: 01566
- UK Parliament: North Cornwall

Daw's House (Cornish: Chidaw) is a hamlet in the parish of South Petherwin, Cornwall, England, on the outskirts of the significant town of Launceston.
