= Luckett, Cornwall =

Hamlet in Cornwall, England

Coordinates: 50.5407°N 4.2746°W

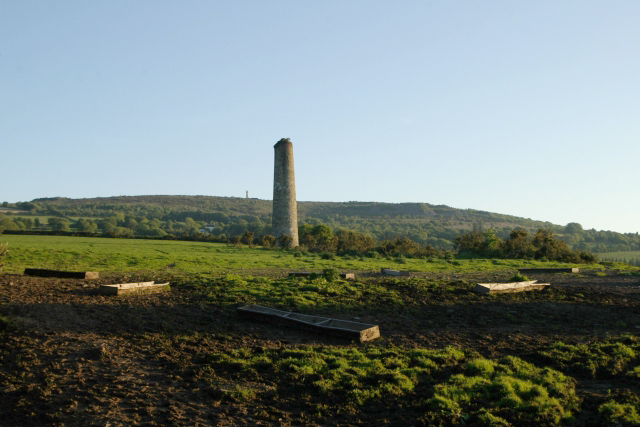
Mining landscape south from Luckett

Luckett (Cornish: Boslova) is a hamlet in east Cornwall, England. It is situated in a former mining area beside the River Tamar approximately three miles (5 km) north of Callington. According to the Post Office the population at the 2011 census was included in the civil parish of Stokeclimsland.

In the 12th century, Luckett became part of a royal deer park called Kerrybullock, until it was disparked by Henry VIII in the early 16th century.

South of the hamlet is Greenscoombe Wood, Luckett SSSI (Site of Special Scientific Interest), noted for its biological interest. All of the land designated as Greenscoombe Wood, Luckett SSSI is owned by the Duchy of Cornwall.
