= Middlewood, Cornwall =

Village in Cornwall, England

Coordinates: 50.551°N 4.439°W

Middlewood
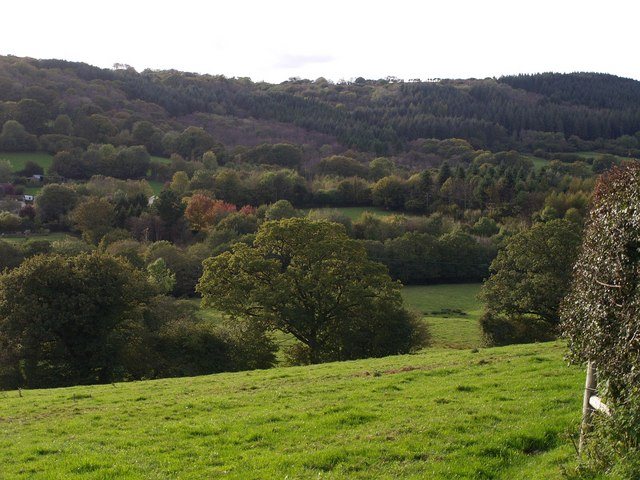
- The Lynher valley at Middlewood

- Location within Cornwall
- OS grid reference: SX273752
- Civil parish: North Hill
- Unitary authority: Cornwall
- Ceremonial county: Cornwall
- Region: South West
- Country: England
- Sovereign state: United Kingdom
- Post town: Launceston
- Postcode district: PL15

Middlewood is a small village in the parish of North Hill, Cornwall, England, UK. Middlewood is in the valley of the River Lynher and on the B3254 road between Launceston and Liskeard. There was formerly a Bible Christian chapel at Middlewood.
