= Bowithick =

Hamlet in Cornwall, England

Coordinates: 50.61690°N 4.57083°W

Bowithick: Cornish: Boswydhek
- Hamlet
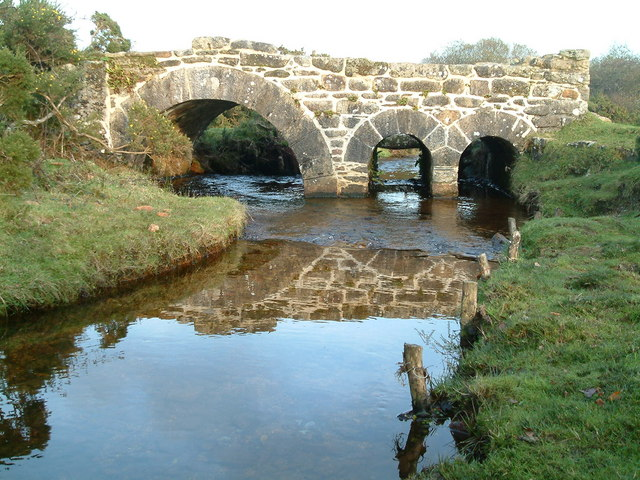
- Bowithick Bridge

- Location within Cornwall
- OS grid reference: SX1882
- Shire county: Cornwall
- Region: South West
- Country: England
- Sovereign state: United Kingdom
- Post town: Launceston
- Postcode district: PL15
- Police: Devon and Cornwall
- Fire: Cornwall
- Ambulance: South Western

Bowithick (Cornish: Boswydhek, meaning Wooded Dwelling) is a hamlet on the northern edge of Bodmin Moor in Cornwall, England, United Kingdom.

Bowithick is situated near the disused Davidstow Moor airfield. The nearest villages are St Clether and Altarnun (where the 2011 Census population is included). There is a ford and two clapper bridges on the Penpont Water and the 346 m (1137 ft) high hill Bray Down nearby with Buttern Hill (1135 ft) immediately to the west of it.

The manor of Bowithick was recorded in the Domesday Book (1086) when it was held by Osferth from Robert, Count of Mortain. He had also held it before 1066 and paid tax for one furlong. There was land for 2 ploughs. There were one villein and 2 smallholders. The value of the manor was 2 shillings though it had formerly been worth 5 shillings.

The area around Bowithick was busier during World War I than it is today due to the presence of a Prisoner-of-war camp, the German prisoners being used to mine wolfram and tin at an opencast mine in Buttern Hill immediately to the south west.

During World War II Bowithick had a near miss when a 115mm shell fired from a 155 mm M1 Howitzer as part of a shoot from the training range on Laneast downs landed in a nearby field that was being ploughed, the ploughman escaping uninjured as he was having lunch at the farmhouse. In April 2021 two small brown crabs were found in the Ford alongside Bowithick Bridge despite being ten miles from the sea as the crow flies.
