= Trenhorne =

Hamlet in Cornwall, England

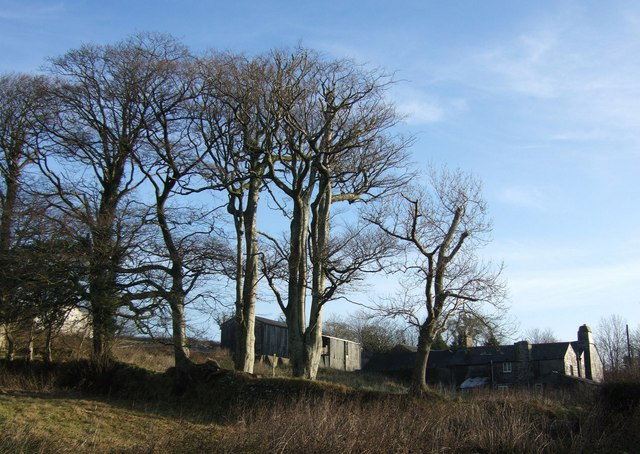
Trenhorne Farm

Trenhorne is a hamlet in the parish of Lewannick, Cornwall, England, United Kingdom.
