= North Hill, Cornwall =

Village in Cornwall, England

Coordinates: 50.563°N 4.441°W

North Hill: Cornish: Bre Gledh
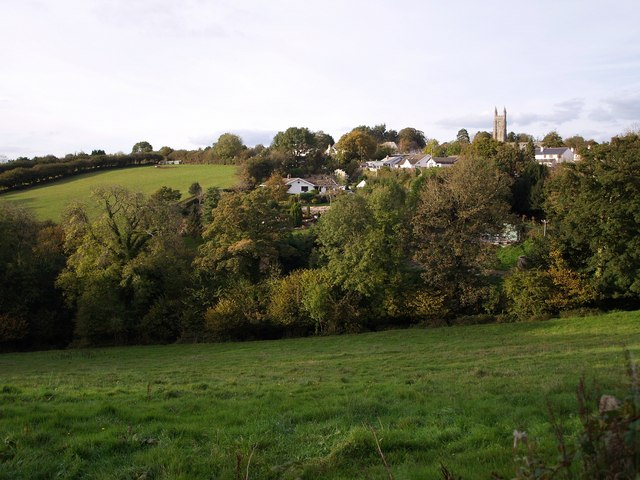
- North Hill village and church seen across the fields

- Location within Cornwall
- Population: 954 (United Kingdom Census 2011 including Addington, Iland and Kingbeeare)
- OS grid reference: SX271767
- Civil parish: North Hill
- Unitary authority: Cornwall
- Ceremonial county: Cornwall
- Region: South West
- Country: England
- Sovereign state: United Kingdom
- Post town: LAUNCESTON
- Postcode district: PL15
- Dialling code: 01566
- Police: Devon and Cornwall
- Fire: Cornwall
- Ambulance: South Western
- UK Parliament: North Cornwall

North Hill (Cornish: Bre Gledh) is a village and civil parish in Cornwall, England, United Kingdom. The village is situated on the east side of the River Lynher approximately six miles (10 km) southwest of Launceston.

North Hill is a large rural parish on the eastern flank of Bodmin Moor bisected northwest to southeast by the River Lynher. It is bounded in the north by Lewannick parish, on the east by Lezant and Linkinhorne parishes, on the south by St Cleer and on the west by Altarnun. Settlements include the church town of North Hill and Coad's Green, Bathpool, Congdon's Shop, Kingbeare, Middlewood, Illand or Yeiland, and Trebartha. The Trebartha estate is one of four farms mentioned in Domesday Book

Trewortha Farm, a children's outdoor education venue, incorporates a reconstruction of a Bronze Age settlement as well as a medieval village of the same name. The medieval village was excavated by the Rev. Sabine Baring-Gould.

North Hill ecclesiastical parish is in the Deanery and Hundred of East. The parish church is dedicated to St Torney whose Holy Well is situated by the River Lynher. The church has a chancel (restored in the 19th century), nave, and north and south aisles. The granite ashlar tower has three stages, is buttressed topped with battlements. The belfry contains six bells. There were also Wesleyan Methodist chapels at North Hill, Coads Green, and Bathpool and Bible Christian chapels at Middlewood and Congdon's Shop.
