= Little Comfort =

Hamlet in Cornwall, England

Coordinates: 50.602°N 4.339°W

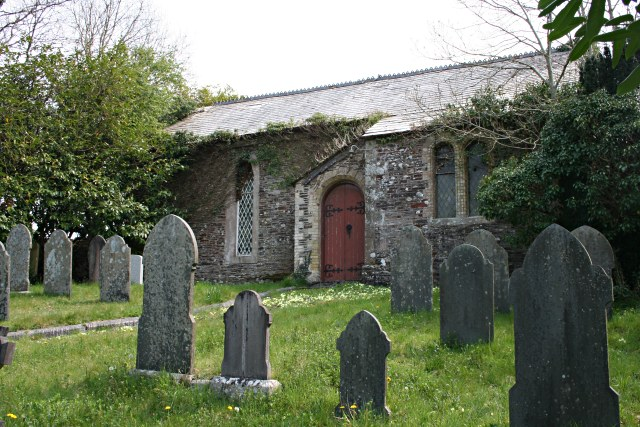
- Little Comfort Church

- Location within Cornwall
- OS grid reference: SX346806
- Civil parish: Lezant
- Unitary authority: Cornwall
- Ceremonial county: Cornwall
- Region: South West
- Country: England
- Sovereign state: United Kingdom
- Post town: Launceston
- Postcode district: PL15 9

Little Comfort is a hamlet in the parish of Lezant in east Cornwall, England, UK. Little Comfort is on the A388 road approximately 2.5 miles (4.0 km) south of Launceston.
