= Treween =

Hamlet in Cornwall, England

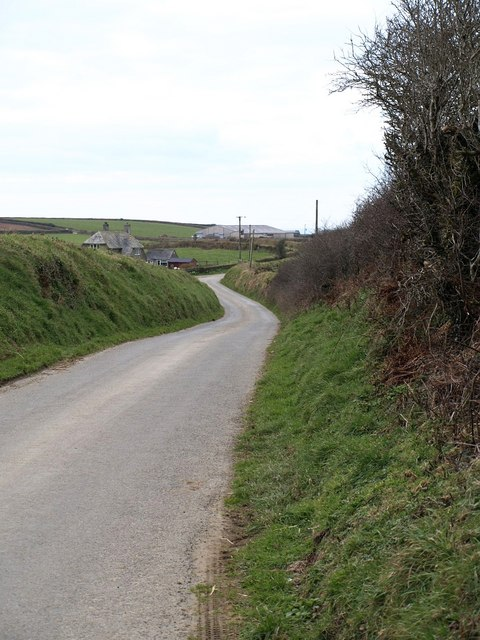
Lane to Treweens Farm.

Treween is a hamlet in the parish of Altarnun, Cornwall, England, United Kingdom.
