= Coad's Green =

Village in Cornwall, England

Coordinates: 50.567°N 04.413°W

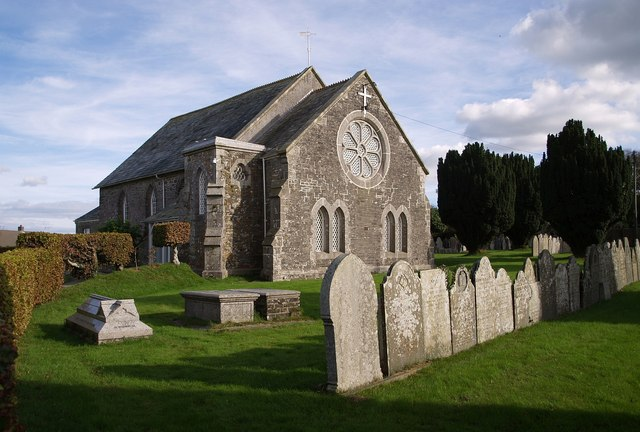
- Coad's Green Methodist Church

- Location within Cornwall
- OS grid reference: SX2976
- Civil parish: North Hill
- Unitary authority: Cornwall
- Ceremonial county: Cornwall
- Region: South West
- Country: England
- Sovereign state: United Kingdom
- Post town: LAUNCESTON
- Postcode district: PL15
- Dialling code: 01566
- Police: Devon and Cornwall
- Fire: Cornwall
- Ambulance: South Western
- UK Parliament: North Cornwall

Coad's Green (or Coads Green) is a village in Cornwall, England, United Kingdom, located on the B3257 in a rural area to the east of Bodmin Moor, about 7 miles (11 km) from the nearest town of Launceston. It is within the parish of North Hill,. It has a primary school, a Methodist church and a village hall. Historically, it has also been referred to as Coades Green. The Hocking's Green apple variety originated in Coad's Green. Group Travel's Launceston to Liskeard service (number 236) passes through the village.
