= Plymouth, Devonport and South Western Junction Railway =

Former English railway company

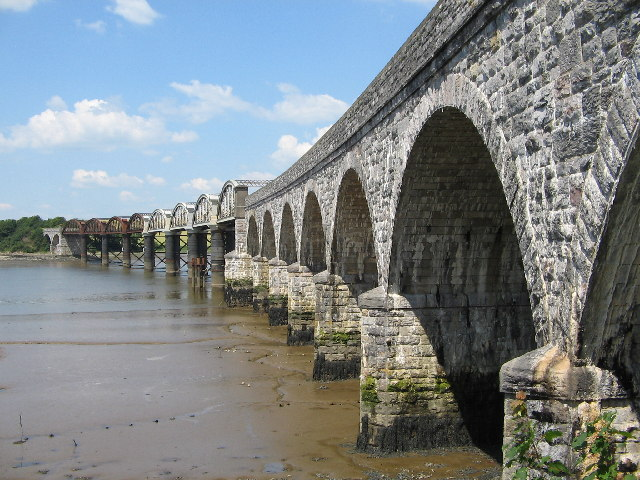
The bridge over the River Tavy between Devonport and Bere Alston

The Plymouth, Devonport and South Western Junction Railway (PD&SWJR) was an English railway company. It constructed a main line railway between Lydford and Devonport, in Devon, England, enabling the London and South Western Railway (LSWR) to reach Plymouth more conveniently than before.

The line was worked by the LSWR as part of its own system, but the PD&SWJR adopted the East Cornwall Mineral Railway which connected Kelly Bray and Calstock, and connected it to the main line at Bere Alston. This became the Callington branch, and the PD&SWJRR operated the line itself through a subsidiary company.

In the 1960s, the main line from Lydford closed, as did the western end of the Callington line, but the section from St Budeaux to Gunnislake remains open and the passenger operation is known as the Tamar Valley Line.

== History ==
=== Plymouth over the South Devon Railway ===
The Great Western Railway (GWR) and its "associated companies", the Bristol and Exeter Railway and the South Devon Railway (SDR), had connected Plymouth and London in 1849, giving the broad gauge group dominance over a large area. In 1859 a line was opened connecting Tavistock to the SDR near Plymouth; this was the South Devon and Tavistock Railway, and it was taken over by the SDR in 1865. An affiliated company, the Launceston and South Devon Railway, extended the line to Launceston via Lidford (later spelt Lydford). The entire line from Launceston to Plymouth was controlled by the SDR.

The rival London and South Western Railway (LSWR) sought to reach Plymouth too; it planned an approach by a northern alignment from Exeter through Okehampton, encouraging the friendly Devon and Cornwall Railway Company to build the line; the LSWR took the smaller company over on 1 January 1872. The chosen course had to penetrate difficult terrain with little population, and at first it limited its ambitions to reaching Lidford: at first only to a terminus there adjacent to the SDR station, reached in 1876.

Although this was a disappointment, it enabled other tactical agreements to be made with the South Devon Railway Company, and avoided a difficult parliamentary battle; as part of the agreement that the D&CR would abandon certain authorised extensions, the SDR granted running powers over its line between Lidford and Devonport, and agreed to build a connecting line in Plymouth (the Cornwall Loop) and a Plymouth station at North Road. The LSWR built a new terminal station (approached from the east) at Devonport, so that down LSWR passenger trains approaching the area ran east-to-west through the North Road station, via the Cornwall Loop to the Devonport terminus. A Plymouth goods station at Friary on the east side of the city was also built at this time.

Relying on facilities provided by a competitor was always unsatisfactory: the SDR naturally gave precedence to its own trains; its Tavistock line had been laid out as a branch line only, with sharp curves and heavy gradients; and the SDR was to be paid 10½d in every shilling (87.5%) of LSWR income on the SDR line. Moreover, the LSWR was progressively doubling the track on its Devon lines, and the SDR section, remaining single with the SDR's own traffic as well as the LSWR's, was increasingly seen as an obstruction.

=== Proposals for a connecting line ===
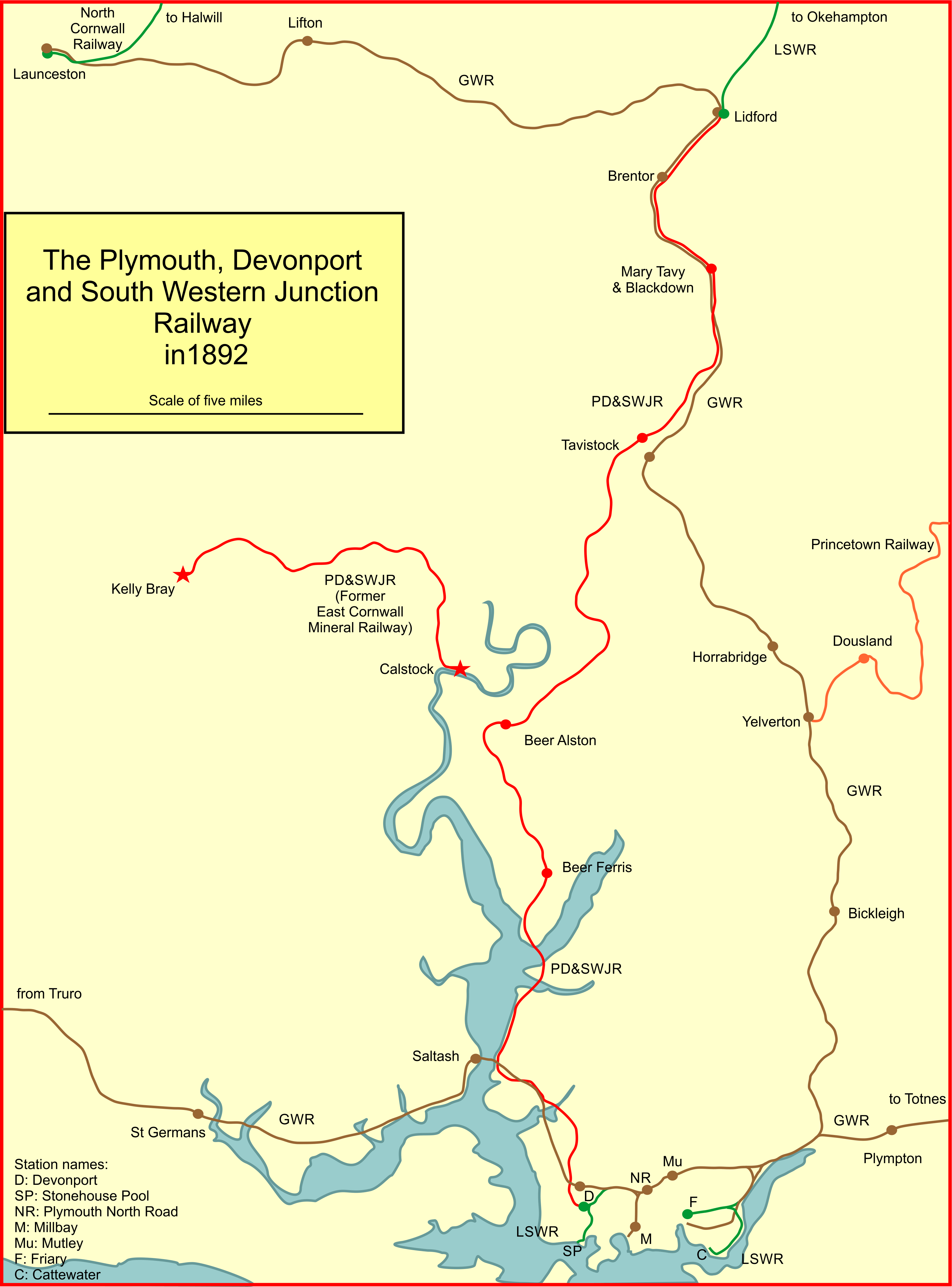
The Plymouth Devonport and South Western Junction Railway in 1892

Devon and Cornwall Central Railway Act 1882
- Act of Parliament
- Parliament of the United Kingdom
- Long title: An Act for incorporating the Devon and Cornwall Central Railway Company and for other purposes.
- Citation: 45 & 46 Vict. c. ccxxviii

Dates
- Royal assent: 18 August 1882

Text of statute as originally enacted

Local interests promoted a Devon and Cornwall Central Railway (D&CCR) which obtained an authorising act of Parliament, the Devon and Cornwall Central Railway Act 1882 (45 & 46 Vict. c. ccxxviii), on 18 August 1882 to build a line from Lidford to Calstock, where it would join an existing short mineral line, the East Cornwall Mineral Railway (ECMR), (Note: The ECMR ran from Kelly Bray to the quayside on the Tamar at Calstock.) which it would purchase and convert it to full railway standards. The D&CCR would therefore reach the Tamar at Calstock and get to Callington.

In the 1883 session, the D&CCR sought powers to extend the authorised line from Gunnislake to run via Beer Alston (later spelt Bere Alston) and Tamerton Foliot to the Devonport terminus of the LSWR; that line would give the LSWR the independent access it required to Plymouth.

In the same session, the Plymouth Devonport and South Western Junction Railway (PD&SWJR) sought powers for a line linking Lidford and Devonport via Tavistock and Beer Ferris (later spelt Bere Ferrers), as well as several branches connecting to other lines, including the D&CCR line authorised in 1882.

Plymouth, Devonport and South Western Junction Railway Act 1883
- Act of Parliament
- Parliament of the United Kingdom
- Long title: An Act for incorporating the Plymouth Devonport and South-Western Junction Railway Company and authorising them to make and maintain the Plymouth Devonport and South-Western Junction Railway and for authorising arrangements between them and the London and South-Western Railway Company and for other purposes.
- Citation: 46 & 47 Vict. c. ccxxx

Dates
- Royal assent: 25 August 1883

Text of statute as originally enacted

Plymouth, Devonport and South Western Junction Railway Act 1884
- Act of Parliament
- Parliament of the United Kingdom
- Long title: An Act for vesting in the Plymouth Devonport and South Western Junction Railway Company the powers conferred by "The Devon and Cornwall Central Railway Act 1882" and for the abandonment of a portion of the Railway authorised by that Act and for the dissolution of the Devon and Cornwall Central Railway Company and for other purposes.
- Citation: 47 & 48 Vict. c. ccxxxi

Dates
- Royal assent: 7 August 1884

Text of statute as originally enacted

The D&CCR proposal alienated many potential supporters: in particular, it was not to pass through the important town of Tavistock (to avoid generating parliamentary opposition from the SDR, who were already serving the town). The PD&SWJR bill was successful, receiving royal assent as the Plymouth, Devonport and South Western Junction Railway Act 1883 (46 & 47 Vict. c. ccxxx) on 25 August 1883; authorised capital was £750,000; the act of Parliament authorised a new independent line in Plymouth connecting Friary and Devonport stations, and with a large central Plymouth station east of Tavistock road; the connecting link from Devonport to Lidford; the branch to the D&CCR line authorised in 1882 near Calstock; and connections to the Dockyard at Devonport. Running powers were granted over the short harbour lines of the LSWR in Plymouth. An agreement was made with the LSWR for them to operate the line for 50% of gross receipts. A further act of Parliament, the Plymouth, Devonport and South Western Junction Railway Act 1884 (47 & 48 Vict. c. ccxxxi) of 7 August 1884 authorised the purchase of the D&CCR and abandonment of its Lidford to Calstock line; a clause was inserted obliging the PD&SWJR to purchase the East Cornwall Mineral Railway within a year of opening to Devonport.

=== Construction ===
The construction of the main line posed significant engineering challenges due to the difficult terrain, and it took some time to gain the necessary subscriptions; the first sod was not cut until 29 March 1887. The contract sum was £793,000 including land acquisition.

The Tavistock station was intended to be at the Launceston road on the northern margin of the town, but local people presented a petition and were successful in altering its location, costing an additional £2,000 due to the need to build special access arrangements.

The line involved three tunnels and seven viaducts, as well as 76 bridges in its 22 miles (35 km). The need to enter the Devonport terminus from the west end, through a residential area, posed particular difficulties, as did the tidal mud inlets in the southern section.

=== Opening ===
Major Marindin of the Board of Trade inspected the main line for approval to open on 23 April 1890. A number of improvements were required, and goods traffic (not subject to the conditions) commenced on 12 May. Passenger traffic started on 1 June 1890.

The route from London to Plymouth was 16 miles (28 km) shorter than the GWR route; the latter still ran via Bristol (until 1906). The 11:00 LSWR express from Waterloo now arrived at Plymouth North Road at 4:45 p.m. (16:45).

On 1 July 1891, the LSWR Friary passenger terminus was opened; when running over the SDR Tavistock line, LSWR passenger trains arriving in the area had run through Plymouth from east to west, calling at the GWR Mutley and Plymouth North Road stations, and terminating at the Devonport terminus. Now they arrived at Devonport, made into a through station, and ran through Plymouth from west to east, continuing to call at Plymouth North Road and once again at Mutley, and turning into the new Friary passenger terminus. The Friary goods station was improved as part of the work, and LSWR goods trains also ran through Plymouth North Road.

At this time, the GWR route from Exeter to Penzance was broad gauge, with mixed gauge provided where required for LSWR trains. However the broad gauge was to be abolished, and in a massive operation in May 1892 the gauge was converted. The first GWR narrow gauge (Note: Prior to this time the two principal gauges were called broad gauge and narrow gauge respectively; increasingly from this time the narrow gauge was regarded as the standard, and the term standard gauge became the normal designation.) Night Mail train from Paddington to Plymouth was passed over the LSWR Okehampton line and the PD&SWJR on the night of 20/21 May 1892; from the night of 23/24 May, the GWR was able to revert to its own route throughout on its newly relaid standard gauge.

=== Plymouth suburban traffic ===
The LSWR energetically developed suburban traffic in the greater Plymouth area, running a relatively frequent stopping service between Friary and St Budeaux. The rise of street-running passenger tramways in Plymouth from 1872 posed a competitive threat, and this accelerated when electric trams were introduced in 1899. The LSWR responded by introducing railmotors, single passenger coaches with an integrated steam power unit, on 26 September 1906, with additional halts opened on 1 November that year. The service proved popular, and in some cases the railmotors themselves were replaced by conventional trains because of capacity problems. Nonetheless, street-running public passenger transport achieved gradual dominance, and the LSWR found that outer suburban services were more beneficial.

=== Lydford link removed ===
In 1915, the connection from the LSWR line to the GWR line was removed; exchange facilities through the sidings remained.

== The Callington branch ==
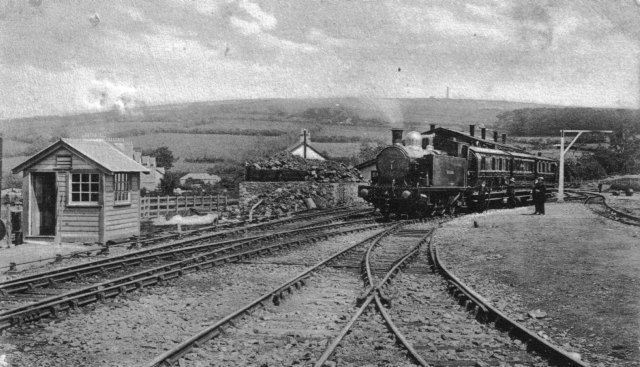
Locomotive 5 Lord St Levan with a train at Callington

The East Cornwall Mineral Railway (ECMR) had opened a narrow gauge line from Kelly Bray to Calstock quay (on the River Tamar, concerned chiefly with mineral extraction. That short line lay about 4 miles (7 km) from the PD&SWJR line, and the PD&SWJR obtained powers as part of the Plymouth, Devonport and South Western Junction Railway Act 1884 (47 & 48 Vict. c. ccxxxi) to acquire the ECMR and to connect it with its main line. After some considerable delay it took active steps to do so, obtaining authorisation by the Bere Alston and Calstock Light Railway Order 1900 of 12 July 1900 to build the connecting line, and to operate the ECMR line (but not the incline to the Tamar quay) as a passenger line; the gauge was to be 3 ft 6in. The estimated cost was £74,014, because of the necessity to cross the River Tamar on a high viaduct.

Plymouth, Devonport and South Western Junction Railway Act 1902
- Act of Parliament
- Parliament of the United Kingdom
- Long title: An Act for constituting the Bere Alston and Calstock Light Railway and a portion of the East Cornwall Mineral Railway a separate undertaking and for other purposes.
- Citation: 2 Edw. 7. c. xxx

Dates
- Royal assent: 28 April 1902

There was little interest in subscribing to this venture and after further inactivity the LSWR was persuaded to subscribe the capital, receiving 3% guaranteed shares. Application was made to Parliament and the Bere Alston and Calstock Light Railway was established as a separate company by the Plymouth, Devonport and South Western Junction Railway Act 1902 (2 Edw. 7. c. xxx) of 23 June 1902, capital £135,000. A further light railway order, the Bere Alston and Calstock Light Railway (Amendment) Order 1905 of 12 October 1905, authorised the adoption of the standard gauge on the line, implying conversion of the existing East Cornwall Mineral line.

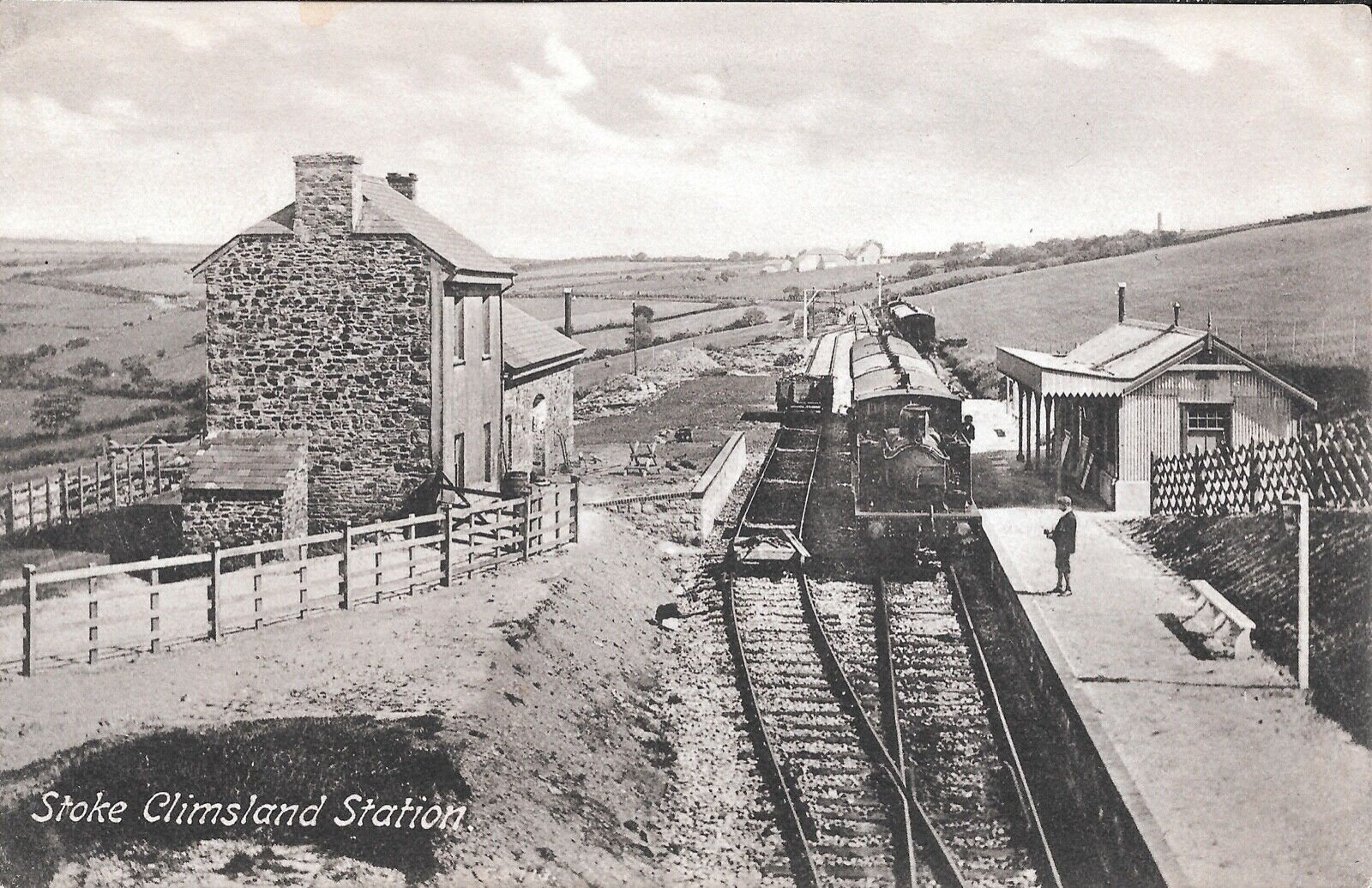
Stoke Climsland railway station

The branch was engineered under the supervision of Colonel Stephens with the consulting engineers Galbraith and Church; it had to cross the River Tamar at Calstock at a high level and the construction took a considerable time, finally opening on 2 March 1908. The conversion of the gauge of the old ECMR line had taken only two days. The ECMR had used a rope-worked incline to reach the Tamar quay at Calstock; the incline was abandoned and a wagon lift was provided to move wagons to the quay.

An approach was made to the LSWR inviting them to work the line, but the PD&SWJR were advised to work it themselves, which they did.

Passenger stations were:

- Bere Alston; station on the main line
- Calstock
- Gunnislake; at the site of the former Drakewalls Depot
- Chilsworthy; opened 1 June 1909
- Latchley
- Seven Stones; opened 15 June 1910; closed September 1917
- Stoke Climsland; formerly Monk's Corner; renamed Luckett 1 November 1909
- Callington Road; formerly Kelly Bray; renamed Callington for Stoke Climsland 1 November 1909.

There were four return passenger trips and one short working from Bere Alston to Gunnislake, but the service was soon augmented somewhat. However, the goods and mineral traffic was disappointing. In 1912 the lift operator at Calstock was dispensed with on the grounds of infrequent use of the lift.

An extension was proposed from the Callington Road station to Callington itself, and on to Congdon's Shop, and a light railway order was secured for the purpose on 11 February 1909; however this was never built and the powers allowed to lapse. Similar extension proposals were tabled in later years, but never authorised.

Whereas the PD&SWJR main line was worked by the LSWR ostensibly as part of its own system, the Callington branch was worked independently by the PD&SWJR.

== From 1923 ==
The Railways Act 1921 determined that most of the main line railways of Great Britain were to be formed into four "groups", and the PD&SWJR was listed as one of the "subsidiary companies" of the Southern Group. In fact for administrative convenience, the PD&SWJR was absorbed into the LSWR on 11 December 1922; the LSWR itself became a constituent part of the new Southern Railway on 1 January 1923.

Remote from the other main Southern Railway constituents, the PD&SWJR route was not outwardly affected by the organisational change. However the GWR had gradually been improving its competing passenger service to Plymouth at the expense of the Southern route, and the Southern Railway decided that the service to the Ilfracombe branch, on which it had dominance, offered better returns. Multiple part passenger trains from London had traditionally favoured Plymouth as the prime destination, but this emphasis was altered. A 40 mph (64 km/h) speed restriction was imposed between Bridestowe and Ford to achieve permanent way maintenance economies in 1925.

The Admiralty constructed a new Royal Naval Armaments Depot on the site of a former battery at Ernesettle, alongside the PD&SWJR line immediately north of the Royal Albert Bridge. This was commissioned in 1926; although there was an internal narrow gauge track system, there was no main line connection until 3 July 1938.

During World War II, the Plymouth area suffered exceptionally from bombing attacks. In 1941, a connection from the Bere Alston line to the GWR line at St Budeaux was opened on 2 March, enabling Southern Railway trains to use the GWR. The Lydford link, removed in 1915, was reinstated on 30 May 1943.

On 20 June 1947, the Southern Railway instituted the Devon Belle, an all-Pullman train running between Waterloo and Plymouth, with an Ilfracombe portion. However Plymouth patronage was disappointing, and the Plymouth portion was taken off from the end of the 1949 summer season.

== Partial closure ==
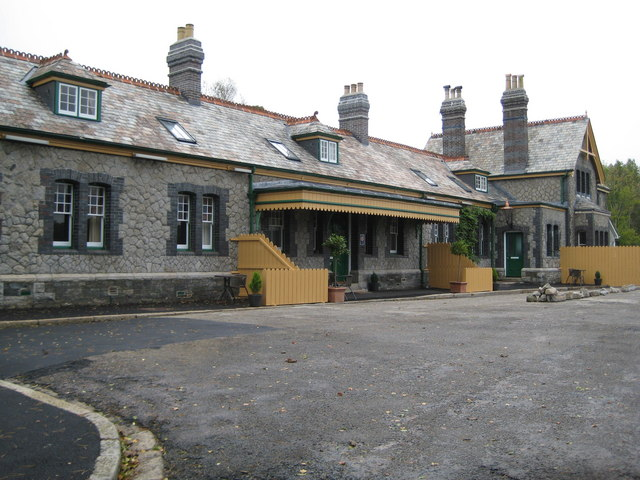
Tavistock North railway station in 2008

The general increase in road use led to a steep decline in use of the line in the 1950s, and closure of parts of the route came under consideration. Following the report the Reshaping of British Railways published in 1963 led to the so-called Beeching cuts, which resulted in the suspension of the Atlantic Coast Express trains after 5 September 1964, the PD&SWJR route being reduced to the status of a secondary line. Freight traffic was substantially reduced. From 7 September 1964 the line between St Budeaux Junction and Devonport Junction was closed, all trains from the Tavistock line using the GWR route. A stub to Devonport Kings Road remained open until 7 March 1971 for parcel traffic.

The line between Gunnislake and Callington was closed on 5 November 1966 and that from Bere Alston to Lydford was closed on 6 May 1968, along with the remainder of the line to Okehampton. The remainder of the PD&SWJR lines continues in operation, with a local passenger service from Plymouth to Gunnislake. Because of the configuration of the junction there, the trains reverse at Bere Alston; these passenger trains operated under the title the Tamar Valley Line.

== Route ==
=== Stations ===
- Lydford (LSWR station)
- Brentor
- Tavistock; renamed Tavistock North 26 September 1949
- Beer Alston; renamed Bere Alston 18 November 1897
- Beer Ferris; renamed Bere Ferrers 18 November 1897
- Tamerton Foliot, opened 22 December 1897
- St Budeaux; renamed St Budeaux Victoria Road 26 September 1949
- Weston Mill Halt; opened 1 November 1906; closed September 1921
- Camels Head Halt; opened 1 November 1906; closed 4 May 1942
- Ford
- Albert Road Halt; opened 1 October 1906; closed 13 January 1947
- Devonport (LSWR station); renamed Devonport (Kings Road) 26 September 1949.

== Locomotives ==
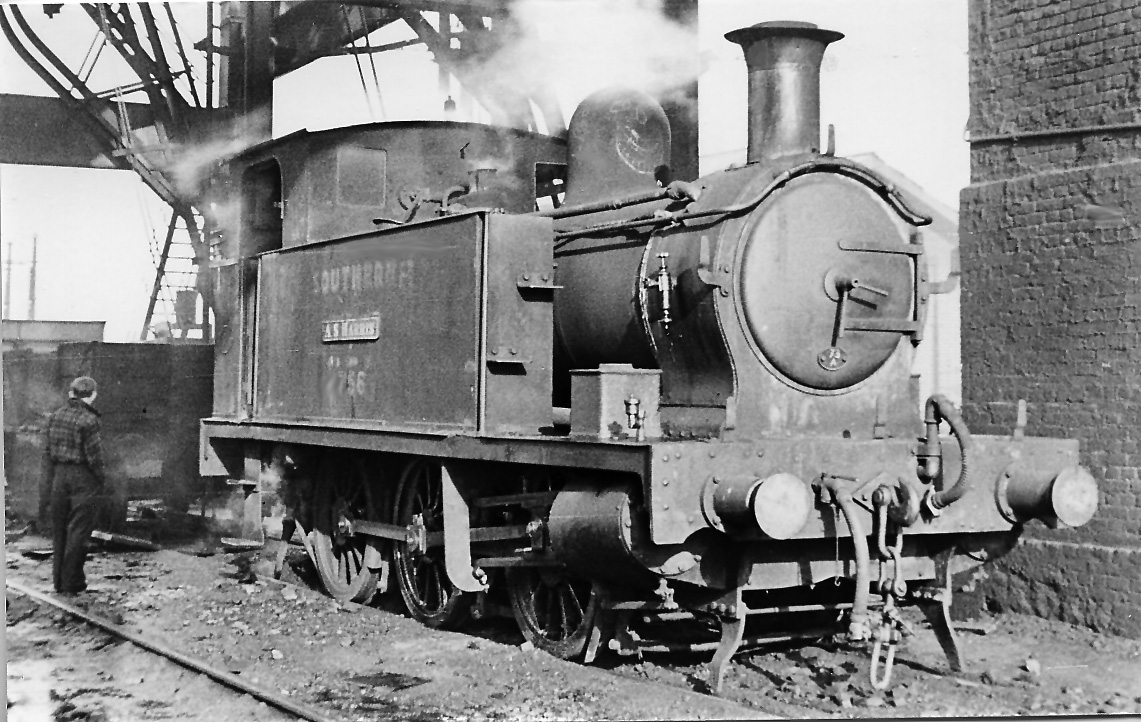
Locomotive No. 3 in later years

For the 1908 extension three new steam locomotives were ordered from Hawthorn Leslie and Company, and one of the 3 ft 6 in gauge Neilson and Company locomotives from the East Cornwall Mineral Railway was rebuilt to standard gauge. Their leading dimensions were:

PD&SWJR no.	Name	LSWR number	Wheel arrangement	Driving wheels	Cylinders	Boiler pressure	Notes
3	A. S. Harris	756	0-6-0T	3 ft 10 in	14 in x 22 in	170 psi	
4	Earl of Mount Edgcumbe	757	0-6-2T	4 ft 0 in	16 in x 24 in	170 psi	
5	Lord St Levan	758	0-6-2T	4 ft 0 in	16 in x 24 in	170 psi	
	Kelly	-	0-4-2T	3 ft 1 in	10 in x 18 in	90 psi	Rebuilt from East Cornwall Mineral Railway No.2, Neilson 0-4-2ST

The Hawthorn Leslie locomotives were blue with brass dome covers and chimney caps. Once the LSWR had absorbed the PD&SWJR, nos. 3–5 were repainted in LSWR livery and renumbered 756–8; this process took several months, completed with no. 757 Earl of Mount Edgcumbe in October 1923. They were repainted in SR livery between March 1926 and April 1927, and their LSWR numbers were prefixed with the letter E, denoting Eastleigh Works, which had been responsible for their maintenance following the cessation of repairs at Callington Road in mid-1923. The E prefix was dropped on the SR's 1931 renumbering. British Railways livery and numbers were applied to 757 (30757) in May 1949 and 758 (30758) in December 1950, but 756 was withdrawn in October 1951 without being renumbered. 30757 and 30758 were withdrawn in December 1957 and December 1956 respectively.

== Reopening proposal ==
The Exeter - Newton Abbot main line via Dawlish was severed for several weeks by extreme weather in early 2014, and it has been suggested that the entire Exeter - Crediton - Okehampton - Tavistock - St Budeaux line should be reconstituted as an emergency diversionary route, in case of a repetition. Critics observe that this scheme would be expensive, (although no cost has been quoted) and would fail to serve Torbay. Tavistock (population 12,627), and Okehampton (population 7,138) are the largest communities that would be served by such a re-opening outside of emergency periods.

== See also ==
- Southern Railway routes west of Salisbury
