= Altarnun =

Village in Cornwall, England

Coordinates: 50.603°N 4.511°W

Altarnun: Cornish: Alternonn
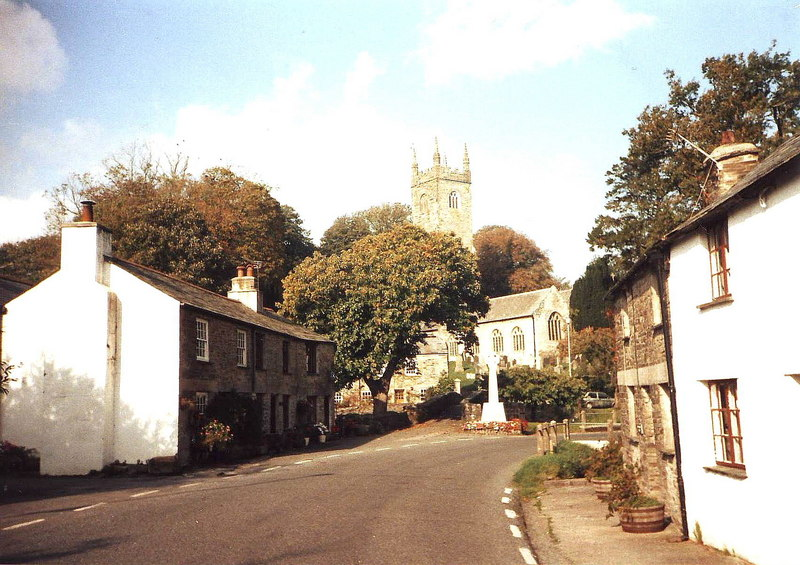

- Location within Cornwall
- Population: 4,038 (Civil Ward, 2001); 1,100 (2021 Census including Bowithick)
- OS grid reference: SX 223 812
- Civil parish: Altarnun
- Unitary authority: Cornwall
- Ceremonial county: Cornwall
- Region: South West
- Country: England
- Sovereign state: United Kingdom
- Post town: LAUNCESTON
- Postcode district: PL15
- Dialling code: 01566
- Police: Devon and Cornwall
- Fire: Cornwall
- Ambulance: South Western
- UK Parliament: North Cornwall

Altarnun (/ˌɔːltərˈnʌn, ˌɒl-/ AWL-tər-NUN, OL-; Standard Written Form: Alternonn) is a village and civil parish in Cornwall, England, United Kingdom. It lies 7 miles (11 km) west of Launceston on the north-eastern edge of Bodmin Moor at grid reference SX 223 811.

The parish of Altarnun includes the village of Fivelanes and the hamlets of Bolventor, Treween and Trewint, and had a population of 976 at the 2001 census, increasing to 1,084 according at the 2011 census. Other hamlets in the parish are Bowithick, Palmersbridge, South Carne, Tolborough, Lower Tregunnon and Tredaule. The area of the parish is 15,018 acres (60.78 km^{2}), the largest in Cornwall. By the time of the 2011 census the figures for the ward of Altarnun were provided. This ward contained 48 locations in the area and gave a population of 4,038.

The moorland area of the parish is large and lies west of the village towards Rough Tor and southwards towards Dozmary Pool. There is a large conifer plantation at Wilsey Down Forest (Halvana Plantation). The village is in the valley of the Penpont Water and the parish is divided by the A30 trunk road which passes close to Fivelanes, once an important stopping place for stage coaches.

== Church ==
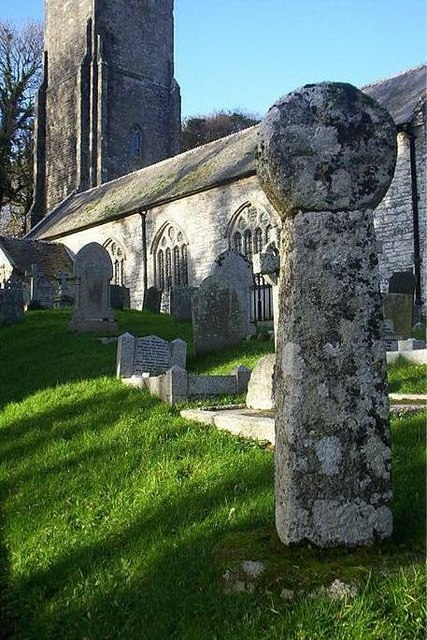
The cross in the churchyard

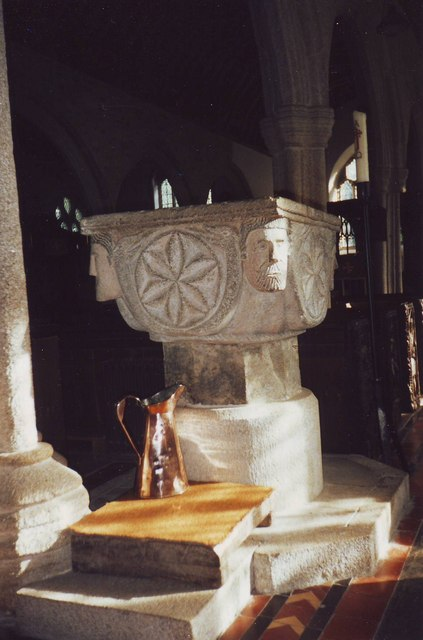
The Norman font

A Norman church was built in Altarnun in the 12th century, but the present church was built in the 15th century from unquarried stone (moorstone) from Bodmin Moor. The church is dedicated to St Nonna, mother of St David. A Celtic cross from the time of St Nonna stands by the church gate. Another cross is at Two-gates by the road about half a mile (0.8 km) north of the church; it is locally known as "Short Cross" and is probably a fragment of what was once a taller stone. Other crosses are known as Sanctuary Cross, Halvana Cross, Occasiney Cross, Trekennick Cross, Tresmeak Cross and St Vincent's Mine Cross.

As the largest parish church on Bodmin Moor, the Church of St Nonna is known as the 'Cathedral of the Moor'. It was built largely in the 15th century in the Perpendicular style, with its bell tower standing 109 ft (33 m) high. It is notable for a fine Norman font and old woodwork, including the screen, bench-ends and communion rails which date to 1684. The screen is one of the finest 15th-century examples in Cornwall; it has three gates and the cornice of vines and tracery and the vaulting are finely carved.

John Wesley often visited Trewint, lodging in Digory Isbell's home which is now a museum of Wesley and Methodism. (The former Altarnun Wesleyan chapel has the head of Wesley carved over the doorway by Neville Northey Burnard. This was done when Burnard was aged sixteen years and lived next door.)

== Language and culture ==
Altarnun features in the novel Jamaica Inn by Daphne du Maurier, set in the parish's former coaching house by the same name. The village was surveyed for the Survey of English Dialects.

== Cornish wrestling ==
Cornish wrestling tournaments, for prizes, were held in Fivelanes in the 1800s.

== Notable people ==
British bryologist Frances Elizabeth Tripp (1832–1890) grew up in Altarnun, where her father was vicar. The village was the birthplace of sculptor Neville Northey Burnard (1818–1878).

== See also ==
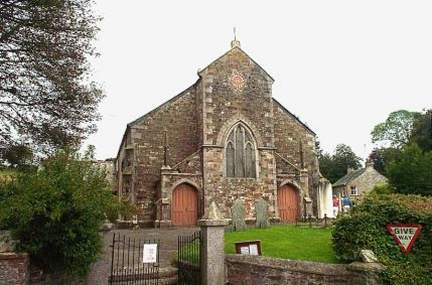
Altarnun Methodist chapel

- Cornish bagpipes
- Gueltas, a Breton commune twinned with Altarnun
