= Kelly Bray =

Village in Cornwall, England

Coordinates: 50.5201°N 4.3160°W

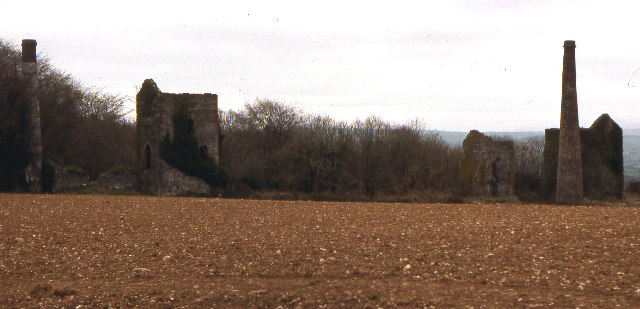
- Old mine buildings near Kelly Bray

- Location within Cornwall
- OS grid reference: SX359715
- Civil parish: Callington
- Shire county: Cornwall
- Region: South West
- Country: England
- Sovereign state: United Kingdom
- Post town: CALLINGTON
- Postcode district: PL17
- Dialling code: 01579
- Police: Devon and Cornwall
- Fire: Cornwall
- Ambulance: South Western
- UK Parliament: South East Cornwall

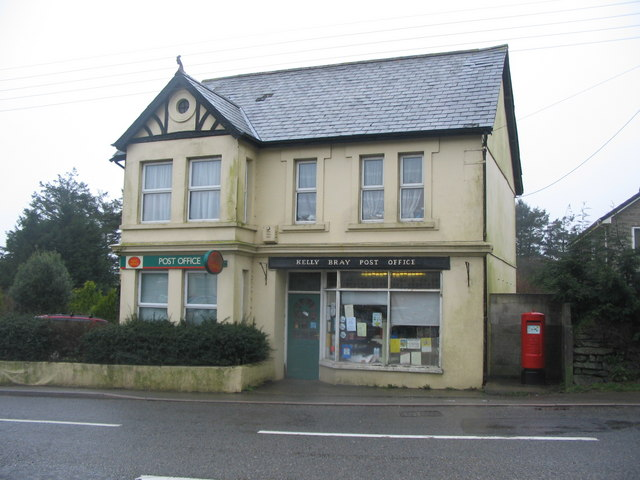
Kelly Bray post office

Kelly Bray (Cornish: Kellivre) is a village in east Cornwall, England, United Kingdom. It is situated one mile (1.6 km) north of Callington, immediately west of Kit Hill in a former mining area. Kelly Bray is in the parish of Callington and lies within the St Dominick, Harrowbarrow and Kelly Bray division on Cornwall Council. The population was 3,949 at the 2011 census. Kelly Bray is first recorded ca. 1286 as Kellibregh (Cornish "Kellybregh", meaning "dappled grove").

Kelly Bray was formerly the venue for the Royal Cornwall Show until it was moved to Wadebridge. The village was the location of Callington railway station - the terminus of a branch line to Plymouth via Gunnislake. The line was closed beyond Gunnislake in 1966.

== Industrial history ==
Prior to the industrialisation in the 19th century agriculture was the main activity in the land surrounding Kelly Bray.

During the 1820s and 1830s a significant capital investment enabled the development of tin copper and lead mines in the area. In 1843 the mine at Kelly Bray amalgamated with the neighbouring mines of Holmbush and Redmoor to form the Callington Mining Company employing a workforce of over 250 people. The mining activity around Kelly Bray continued until 1946.

In the present day various light industrial businesses are situated in the Florence Road Business Park area of the village.

== Cornish wrestling ==
Cornish wrestling tournaments, for prizes have held at Kelly Bray with a first prize of a silver cup.
