= Treburley =

Village in Cornwall, England

Coordinates: 50°34′35″N 4°19′57″W

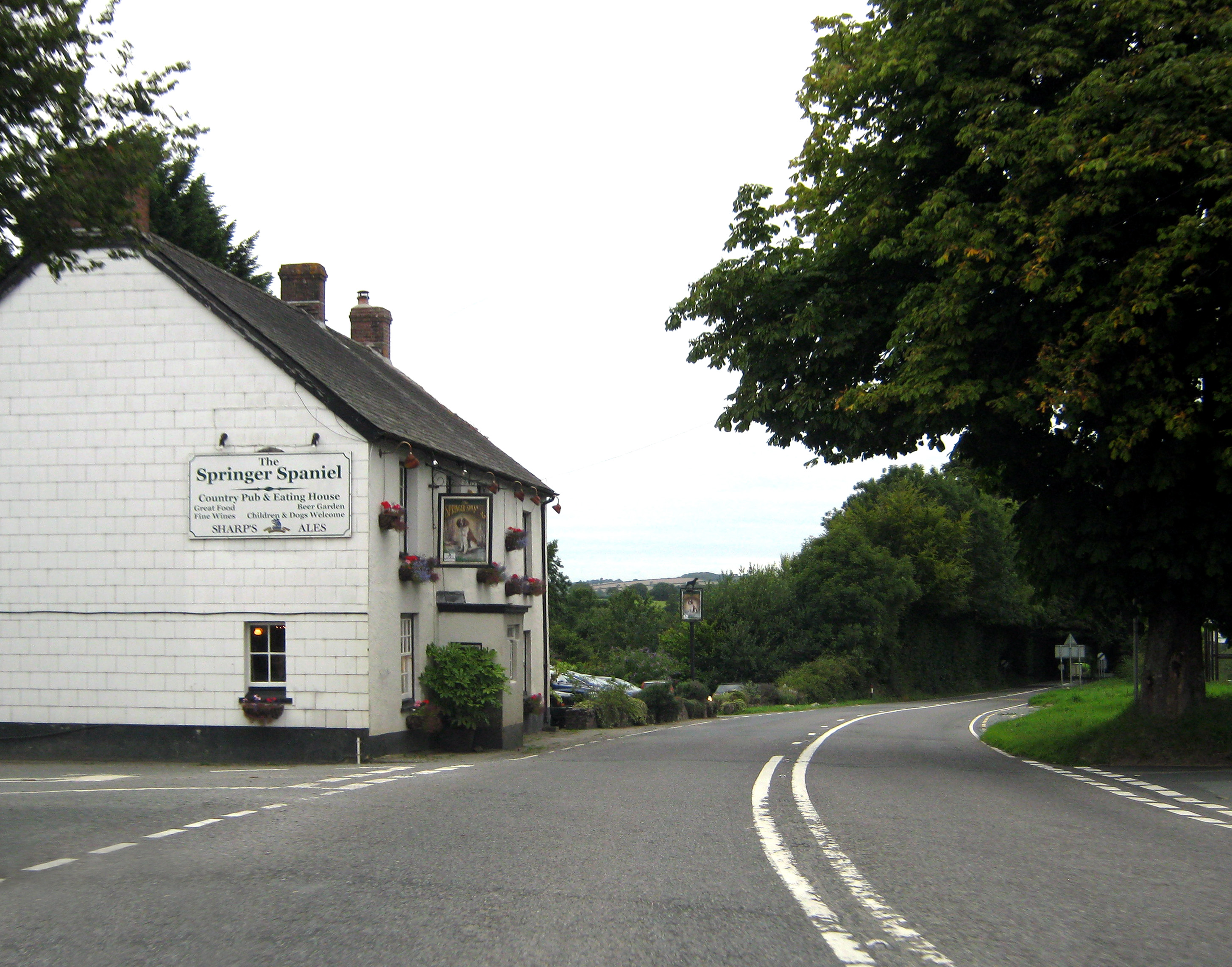
The Springer Spaniel, Treburley, Cornwall

Treburley (Cornish: Treborlay) is a village in Cornwall, England, UK, split by the A388 road leading from Callington to Launceston. Treburley is in the valley of the River Inny about a mile south-southeast of Lezant.
