= Stoke Climsland =

Village in Cornwall, England

Coordinates: 50.546°N 4.316°W

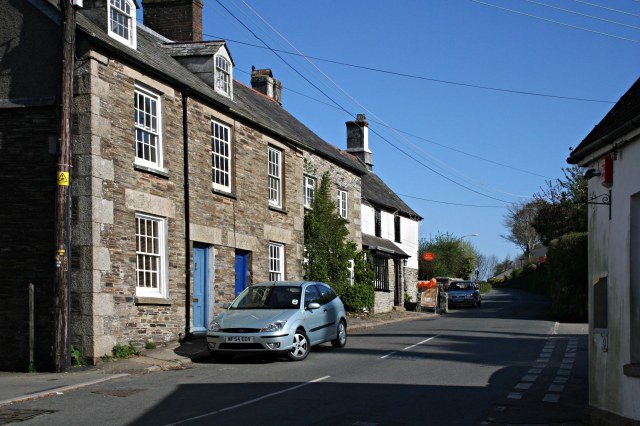
- Main Road, Stoke Climsland

- Location within Cornwall
- OS grid reference: SX360744
- Civil parish: Stokeclimsland
- Shire county: Cornwall
- Region: South West
- Country: England
- Sovereign state: United Kingdom
- Post town: CALLINGTON
- Postcode district: PL17
- Dialling code: 01579
- Police: Devon and Cornwall
- Fire: Cornwall
- Ambulance: South Western

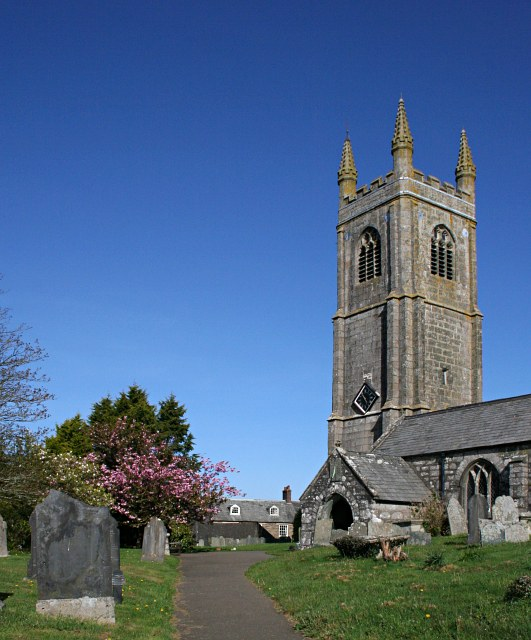
Stoke Climsland Church.

Stoke Climsland is a village in the valley of the River Tamar, Cornwall, England, United Kingdom within the civil parish of Stokeclimsland. The population of the parish including Luckett at the 2011 census was 1,703. An electoral ward of the same name also exists. At the same census the population was 3,703.

== History ==
The manor of Climsland was one of the seventeen Antiqua maneria of the Duchy of Cornwall. The manor was recorded in the Domesday Book of 1086 as Climson; there were 5 hides of land and land for 24 ploughs. One hide was held by the lord (with 3 ploughs and 9 serfs) and 30 villeins and 30 smallholders had 17 ploughs and 4 hides of land. There were also 3 acres of meadow, 16 square leagues of pasture and 3 square leagues of woodland. The income from the manor was £6 sterling.

In the 12th century, Climsland became part of a 250 hectares (620 acres) royal deer park called Kerrybullock, or Carrybullock, until it was disparked by Henry VIII in the 16th century. The park was mentioned in 1282 and its extent was 600 acres. In 1337 the park was recorded as being three leagues around and as having 150 deer. In 1352 Edward the Black Prince sent 6 of the oaks to Stoke for the building of the church there and in 1357 ordered that herds of deer be sent to his other parks at Launceston and Trematon to restock them. In the park was a lodge, still called Lodge House in 1677. Along with other ducal parks Carrybullock was disparked c. 1540 by King Henry VIII; for the next four and a half centuries it became pasture for cattle (today's Duchy Farm). N.B. Another Duchy Farm exists on St Mary's, Isles of Scilly.

== Notable buildings ==
The present church building is 15th century, with north and south aisles and a west tower. The tower is of granite and the wagon roofs are medieval. At Horse Bridge on the road to Tavistock is a fine bridge of seven arches (built in 1437). At Whiteford Sir John Call built a Georgian mansion in 1775 but it no longer exists: the stables and a garden temple remain and a few fragments have been reused in a house nearby.

The post office, opened in 1839, is the oldest sub-Post Office in the UK.

Horse Bridge is a listed medieval bridge across the River Tamar opposite Horsebridge in the parish of Sydenham Damerel in Devon.

== Sport ==
The village had a football team called Stoke Climsland who were champions of Duchy League 2 2017/18 Cornwall Duchy league., however the team has now disbanded.

=== Cornish wrestling ===
Cornish wrestling tournaments, for prizes, were held in Stoke Climsland in the 1800s.

== Notable people ==
- John Grubb (1652–1708), emigrated 1677, an early settler in Delaware
- William Call (1781–1851), banker and High Sheriff of Cornwall; resident of Whiteford House
- Charlotte Mary Matheson (ca. 1888-1937), novelist; herdsman
- Len Harvey (1907–1976), boxer, who held one 'version' of the World's Light-Heavyweight Championship from 1939 until 1942
- David Oates (1927–2004), an archaeologist and academic specializing in the Ancient Near East
- Neil Warnock (born 1948), footballer who played 327 games and football manager
