= Calstock (electoral division) =

Electoral division of Cornwall in the UK

- ward Cornwall Council
- Boundary of Calstock in Cornwall from 2021.
- County: Cornwall

Current ward
- Created: 2021
- Councillor: Angus Crocker (Reform)
- Number of councillors: One
- Created from: Gunnislake and Calstock; St Dominick, Harrowbarrow and Kelly Bray

Calstock is an electoral division of Cornwall in the United Kingdom which returns one member to sit on Cornwall Council. It was created at the 2021 local elections, being created from the former divisions of Gunnislake and Calstock, St Dominick, Harrowbarrow and Kelly Bray. The current councillor is Dorothy Kirk, a member of the Labour Party.

== Boundaries ==
Calstock is coterminous with the parish of Calstock, which includes the settlements of Calstock, Albaston, Chilsworthy, Gunnislake, Harrowbarrow, Latchley, Metherell, Coxpark, Dimson, Drakewalls, Norris Green, Rising Sun and St Ann's Chapel. It is bordered to the east by the River Tamar, to the west by the division of Altarnun & Stoke Climsland, and to the west and south by the division of Callington and St Dominic.

== Election results ==
=== 2021 election ===
2021 Cornwall Council election: Calstock
Party	Candidate	Votes	%	±%
Labour	Dorothy Kirk (Note: Incumbent councillor, formerly representing Gunnislake and Calstock)	1,061	39.1	N/A
Conservative	Jim Flashman (Note: Incumbent councillor, formerly representing St Dominick, Harrowbarrow and Kelly Bray)	763	28.1	N/A
Liberal Democrats	Theo Brown	703	25.9	N/A
Green	Sophie Westwood	189	7.0	N/A
Majority		298	11.0	N/A
Rejected ballots		27	1.0	N/A
Turnout		2,716	50	N/A
Labour win (new seat)				

=== 2024 election ===
Calstock
Party	Candidate	Votes	%	±%
Reform	Angus Crocker	720	29.6	N/A
Labour	Lara Jodie Kramer	661	27.2	−11.9
Liberal Democrats	Andrew Gordon Lynn Brown	478	19.7	−6.2
Conservative	James Anthony Flashman	409	16.8	−11.3
Green	Natasha Anne Ransom	162	6.7	−0.3
Majority		59	2.4	N/A
Rejected ballots		4	0.2	
Turnout		2,430	44	−6
Registered electors		5,533		
Reform gain from Labour				
