= Gunnislake and Calstock (electoral division) =

Electoral division of Cornwall in the UK

- Former ward Cornwall Council
- Boundary of Gunnislake and Calstock in from 2013-2021.
- County: Cornwall

2013–2021
- Number of councillors: One
- Replaced by: Calstock
- Created from: Gunnislake

Gunnislake and Calstock (Cornish: Dowrgonna ha Kalstok) was an electoral division of Cornwall in the United Kingdom which returned one member to sit on Cornwall Council between 2013 and 2021. It was abolished at the 2021 local elections, being succeeded by Calstock.

== Councillors ==
Election	Member	Party
2013	Dorothy Kirk	Labour
2017	Dorothy Kirk	Labour
2021	Seat abolished	

== Extent ==
Gunnislake and Calstock represented the villages of Calstock, Dimson, Gunnislake and Drakewalls, and the hamlets of Albaston and St Ann's Chapel. It was bordered to the east by the River Tamar and to the west by the division of St Dominick, Harrowbarrow and Kelly Bray, and covered a total area of 1120 hectares.

== Election results ==
=== 2017 election ===
2017 election: Gunnislake and Calstock
Party	Candidate	Votes	%	±%
Labour	Dorothy Kirk	800	44.4	▲10.1
Conservative	Sydney Booth	660	36.7	▲6.7
Liberal Democrats	Theo Brown	340	18.9	▲8.0
Majority		140	7.8	▲3.6
Rejected ballots		0	0.0	▼0.3
Turnout		1800	50.0	▲12.3
Labour hold		Swing		

=== 2013 election ===
2013 election: Gunnislake and Calstock
Party	Candidate	Votes	%	±%
Labour	Dorothy Kirk	477	34.3	
Conservative	Russell Bartlett	418	30.0	
UKIP	Sam Gardner	341	24.5	
Liberal Democrats	Martin Emery	152	10.9	
Majority		59	4.2	
Rejected ballots		4	0.3	
Turnout		1392	37.7	
Labour win (new seat)				
