= St Dominick, Harrowbarrow and Kelly Bray (electoral division) =

Electoral division of Cornwall in the UK

- Former ward Cornwall Council
- Boundary of St Dominick, Harrowbarrow and Kelly Bray in Cornwall from 2013-2021.
- County: Cornwall

2013–2021
- Number of councillors: One
- Replaced by: Calstock; Callington and St Dominic
- Created from: Kelly Bray

St Dominick, Harrowbarrow and Kelly Bray (Cornish: Sen Domynek, Kelliskovarnek ha Kellivrygh) was an electoral division of Cornwall in the United Kingdom which returned one member to sit on Cornwall Council between 2013 and 2021. It was abolished at the 2021 local elections, being succeeded by Calstock and Callington and St Dominic.

== Councillors ==
| Election | Member | Party |
|---|---|---|
| 2013 | Jim Flashman | Conservative |
| 2017 | Jim Flashman | Conservative |
| 2021 | Seat abolished | |

== Extent ==
St Dominick, Harrowbarrow and Kelly Bray represented the villages of Kelly Bray, Latchley, Chilsworthy, St Dominick, Harrowbarrow, Norris Green, Bohetherick, St Mellion and Metherell, and the hamlets of Ashton and Newton. It covered 4070 hectares in total.

== Election results ==
=== 2017 election ===
2017 election: St Dominick, Harrowbarrow and Kelly Bray
| Party | Candidate | Votes | % | ±% |
|---|---|---|---|---|
| Conservative | Jim Flashman | 690 | 40.2 | |
| Liberal Democrats | Matthew Waterworth | 517 | 30.1 | |
| Mebyon Kernow | Mark Smith | 365 | 21.2 | |
| Labour | Alistair Tinto | 143 | 8.3 | |
| Majority | | 173 | 10.1 | |
| Rejected ballots | | 3 | 0.2 | |
| Turnout | | 1718 | 49.4 | |
| Conservative hold | | Swing | | |

=== 2013 election ===
2013 election: St Dominick, Harrowbarrow and Kelly Bray
| Party | Candidate | Votes | % | ±% |
|---|---|---|---|---|
| Conservative | Jim Flashman | 477 | 36.1 | |
| UKIP | Dave Lawson | 371 | 28.1 | |
| Independent | Phillip Harriman | 193 | 14.6 | |
| Mebyon Kernow | Maria Coakley | 139 | 10.5 | |
| Liberal Democrats | Charles Jones | 138 | 10.4 | |
| Majority | | 106 | 8.0 | |
| Rejected ballots | | 3 | 0.2 | |
| Turnout | | 1321 | 38.1 | |
| Conservative win (new seat) | | | | |
