= Chilsworthy =

Chilsworthy may refer to one of two villages in England:

- Chilsworthy, Cornwall
  - Chilsworthy railway station, a former station
- Chilsworthy, Devon
