= Gunnislake (electoral division) =

Former electoral division of Cornwall in the UK

Gunnislake was an electoral division of Cornwall in the United Kingdom. As a division of Cornwall Council, it returned one member from 2009 to 2013 before being redistricted into Gunnislake and Calstock. As a division of Caradon District Council, it returned one member from 1973 to 2003, when seats were rearranged.

== Councillors ==
=== Cornwall Council ===
Election	Member	Party
2009	Russell Bartlett	Conservative
2013	Seat abolished; replaced by Gunnislake and Calstock	

=== Caradon District Council ===
Election	Member	Party
1973	I. Standing	Independent
1976	L. Rodda	Independent
1979	T. Smale	Labour
1983	T. Smale	Labour
1987	T. Smale	Labour
1991	T. Smale	Labour
1995	T. Smale	Labour
1999	T. Smale	Labour
2003	Seat abolished	

== Cornwall Council division ==
Gunnislake
- Former ward Cornwall Council
- County: Cornwall

2009–2013
- Number of councillors: One
- Replaced by: Gunnislake and Calstock
- Created from: Council created

=== Election results ===
==== 2009 election ====
2009 election: Gunnislake
Party	Candidate	Votes	%	±%
Conservative	Russell Bartlett	512	29.7	
Independent	Dorothy Kirk	324	18.8	
Liberal Democrats	Matthew Waterworth	323	18.7	
UKIP	Sam Gardner	288	16.7	
Green	Nigel Miles	209	12.1	
Independent	Sharon Daw	67	38.9	
Majority		188	10.9	
Turnout		1723	48.1	
Conservative win (new seat)				

== Caradon District Council division ==
Gunnislake
- Former ward Caradon District Council
- County: Cornwall

1973–2003
- Number of councillors: One
- Replaced by: Calstock
- Created from: Council created

=== Election results ===
==== 1999 election ====
1999 election: Gunnislake
Party	Candidate	Votes	%	±%
Labour	T. Smale	457	67.4	
Liberal Democrats	A. Darby	221	32.6	
Majority		236	34.8	
Turnout		678	47.8	
Labour hold		Swing		

==== 1995 election ====
1995 election: Gunnislake
Party	Candidate	Votes	%	±%
Labour	T. Smale	Unopposed		
Majority		N/A		
Turnout		N/A		
Labour hold		Swing		

==== 1991 election ====
1991 election: Gunnislake
Party	Candidate	Votes	%	±%
Labour	T. Smale	Unopposed		
Majority		N/A		
Turnout		N/A		
Labour hold		Swing		

==== 1987 election ====
1987 election: Gunnislake
Party	Candidate	Votes	%	±%
Labour	T. Smale (Note: Although the source has the candidate at this election recorded as "G. Smale", it is assumed that this is an error)	Unopposed		
Majority		N/A		
Turnout		N/A		
Labour hold		Swing		

==== 1983 election ====
1983 election: Gunnislake
Party	Candidate	Votes	%	±%
Labour	T. Smale	Uncontested		
Majority		N/A		
Turnout		N/A		
Labour hold		Swing		

==== 1979 election ====
1979 election: Gunnislake
Party	Candidate	Votes	%	±%
Labour	T. Smale	407	51.6	
Independent	G. Southcott	382	48.4	
Majority		25	3.2	
Turnout		789	78.0	
Labour gain from Independent		Swing		

==== 1976 election ====
1976 election: Gunnislake
Party	Candidate	Votes	%	±%
Independent	L. Rodda	215	39.2	
Independent	A. Knott	208	37.9	
Labour	T. Smale	126	23.0	
Majority		7		
Turnout		549	57.1	
Independent gain from Independent		Swing		

==== 1973 election ====
1979 election: Gunnislake
Party	Candidate	Votes	%	±%
Independent	I. Standing	271	70.9	
Independent	M. Hunt	87	22.8	
Independent	T. Kerslake	24	6.3	
Majority		184	48.2	
Turnout		382	38.0	
Independent win (new seat)				

== See also ==
- Politics of Cornwall
- Caradon
