= Callington and St Dominic (electoral division) =

Electoral division of Cornwall in the UK

- ward Cornwall Council
- Boundary of Callington and St Dominic in Cornwall from 2021.
- County: Cornwall

Current ward
- Created: 2021
- Councillor: Andrew Long (Mebyon Kernow)
- Number of councillors: One
- Created from: Callington; St Dominick, Harrowbarrow and Kelly Bray

Callington and St Dominic is an electoral division of Cornwall in the United Kingdom which returns one member to sit on Cornwall Council. It was created at the 2021 local elections, being formed from the former division of Callington and parts of the St Dominick, Harrowbarrow and Kelly Bray division. The current councillor is Andrew Long, a member of Mebyon Kernow.

== Extent ==
Callington and St Dominic represents the town of Callington, the villages of Kelly Bray, St Dominic and Bohetherick, and the hamlets of Frogwell, Ashton and Burraton.

== Election results ==
=== 2021 election ===
2021 election: Callington and St Dominic
Party	Candidate	Votes	%	±%
Mebyon Kernow	Andrew Long	956	49.2	
Conservative	Andrew Budd	784	40.3	
Labour	Alex Polglase	192	9.9	
Majority		172	8.9	
Rejected ballots		11	0.6	
Turnout		1943	36.9	
Registered electors		5270		
Mebyon Kernow win (new seat)				
