= Devonport High =

Devonport High may refer to:

- Devonport High School for Boys, Plymouth, England
- Devonport High School for Girls, Plymouth, England
- Devonport High School, Devonport, Tasmania
