= St Andrew's Church, Calstock =

14th-century Anglican parish church of Calstock in Cornwall, England

St. Andrew's Church
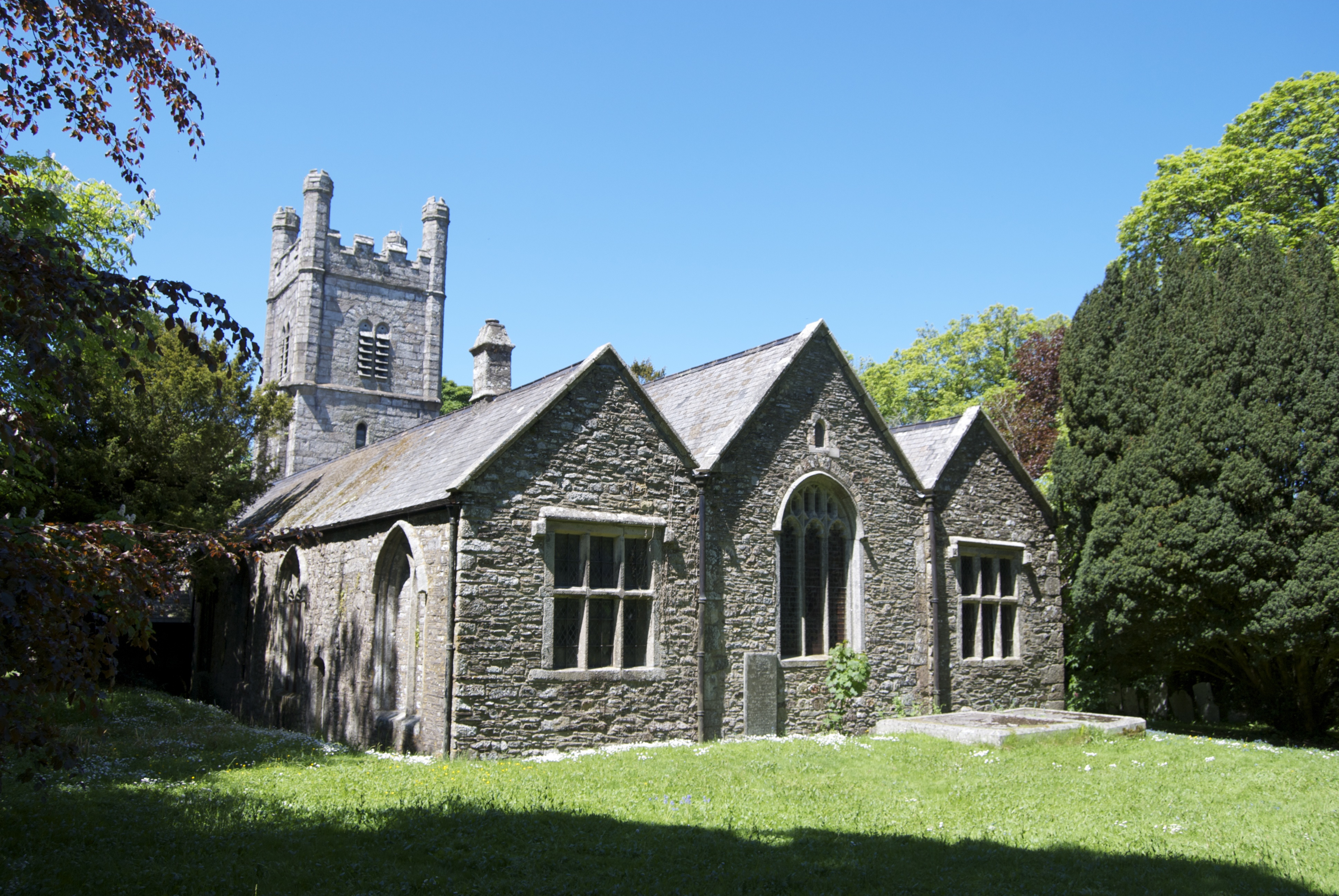
- St. Andrew's Church, after the grave stones were moved in 1967

- Location within Cornwall
- 50°29′49″N 4°12′36″W
- Type: Church
- Location: Calstock, Cornwall

History
- Built: 14th century

Listed Building – Grade I
- Official name: Church of St Andrew, Calstock
- Designated: 19 October 1987
- Reference no.: 1140252

St Andrew's is the Anglican parish church of Calstock in Cornwall and dates to the 14th century. It is a Grade I listed building.

== History ==
The church stands within the extent of a recently discovered Roman fort at the top of the hill overlooking the town. It is said to have been consecrated about 1290. Nothing obvious remains of this early period, but the pillars and arches to the north of the centre aisle of the present building are early 14th century. About 1420 the south aisle was added, and the whole church re-roofed. There were presumably several later restorations, but in 1861 an architectural survey of the diocese of Exeter noted that

the whole church is in a sad state, chocked with pews of all heights . . . encumbered with hideous gallery and collection of rubbish within.

This resulted in the thorough restoration of 1867, carried out at a cost of £600, and under the direction of Mr. James Piers St Aubyn (1815–95). St. Aubyn, a relative of the well-known family residents of St Michael’s Mount, had an architectural practice in London and Devonport, and was responsible for the restoration of many West Country churches. Here at Calstock the floor levels were altered, the existing tiles laid, the chancel given its present roof, and the building furnished with plain pitched-pine pews. However, severe though the restorations was, many of interesting features of the church were preserved.

== Exterior ==
The large granite blocks (e.g., in the tower and porch) generally denote 15th-century work. The north and south wall appears to have been largely rebuilt at some time, and it is likely that the intersecting window mullions were introduced some time in the 18th century to replace the original cusped lights. The 15th-century turret projecting from the north wall contains a rood staircase. East of this turret are granite quoins which mark the original end of the north aisle. Beyond this, and constructed of quite different stone, is the Edgcumb Chapel of 1558. The initials R.E. (Richard Edgecumb) appear on the hood mould of the door. The south aisle of the church had also been extended to match the north aisle. The south aisle extension contains a vestry which was in existence before 1861.

=== Tower ===
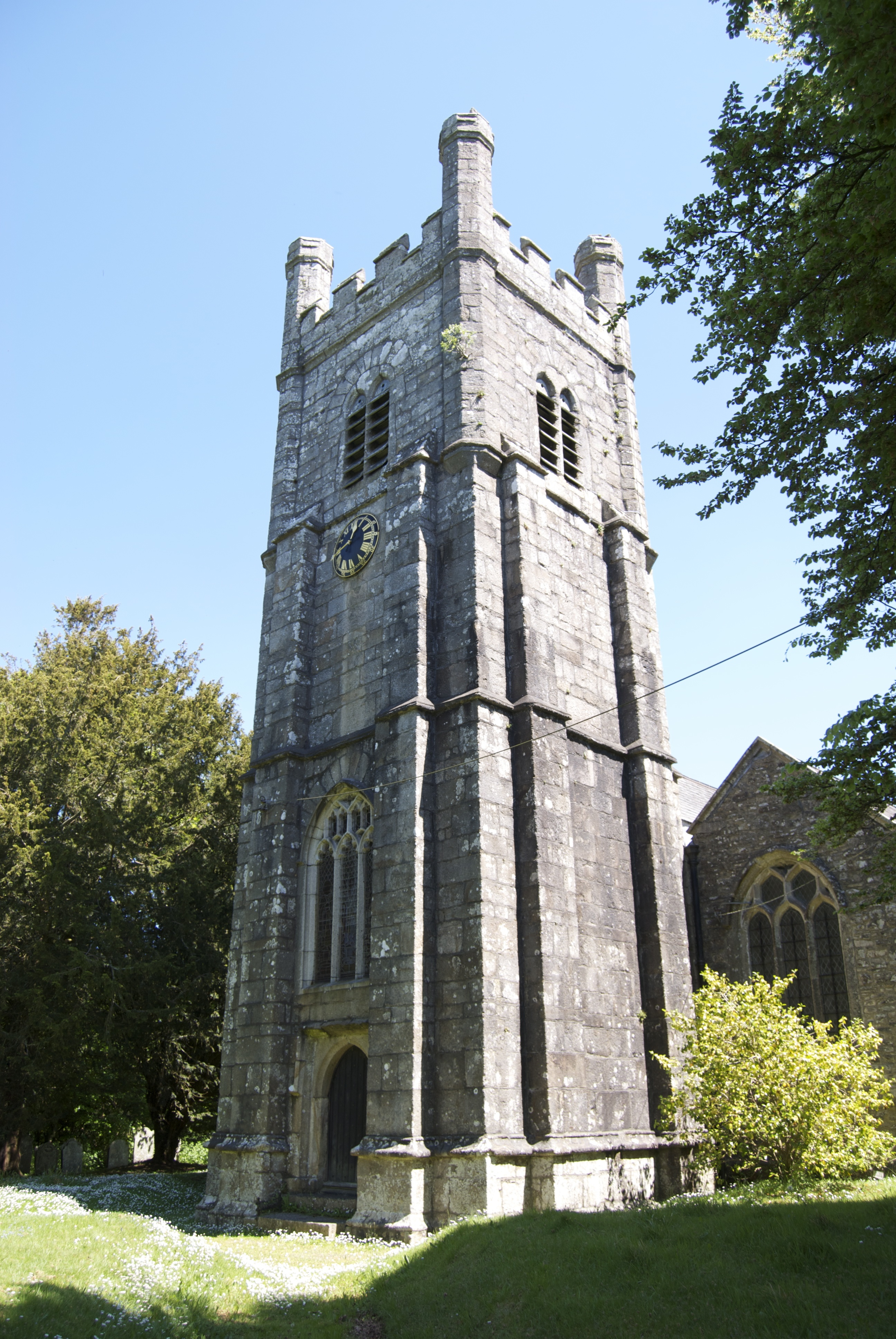
St. Andrew's church tower

The tower, of three stages, buttressed and battlemented, is an impressive landmark. Pinnacles once surmounted the turrets, and according to the Exeter Mercury of 24 November 1790:

"a storm of thunder and lightning happened ... The lightning fell on the tower, threw down the western pinnacles, and made a breach in the steeple down to the belfry. From the tower the electric fluid took its direction through the church and tore the altar piece to shivers."

The second stage of the Tower has a large stained glass window, facing west. At the top of the stained glass window there are four crests, the first crest is that of the Scorrer family who owned the Harewood Estate just 1 km (0.62 mi) east of the church.

=== Porch ===
The porch contains interesting features: (1) Remains of a holy water stoup can be seen in the northeast corner. (2) There is a fireplace in the southwest corner with granite lintel and jamb. A few comparable porch fireplaces exist in Devon, but they are rare. The purpose of such fireplace is uncertain. It may have been used for the kindling of the Easter fire. It was more probably used in accordance with the old-time notions of hygiene, and to keep disease out of the building. (3) The stone threshold contains traces of brass nails embedded in the surface, which suggests the stone once held an effigy, and was perhaps part of an altar tomb.

== Churchyard ==
The arms of the Diocese, of which the Parish of Calstock belongs to, Diocese of Truro

A granite cross at the eastern end of the churchyard marks the grave of Sir William Lewis Salusbury-Trelawny, 8th Baronet, of Harewood Estate, one of Salusbury-Trelawny baronets, who was Lord Lieutenant of Cornwall and M.P. for East Cornwall. He died at Harewood in 1856, aged seventy five years. Folklore says that Sir William didn't want his body ever to leave his estate and so he was carried in through the back gate to his current resting spot, closest to his estate. Inside the church, just north of the pulpit, are two plaques:

1. At the top of one is inscribed "Lau Deo" ("Praise God"). Below that is inscribed the names of the four children of Sir William, the oldest living to just 28.
2. At the top of the other is an image of the cross, inscribed "Beneath The Cross"; below, Sir William and his wife are depicted. Below them is their fifth child, who died in middle age.

Other gravestones record deaths from mining and other industrial accidents. Though now set in quiet rural countryside, the church during the 19th century was surrounded by industrial activity, and the people of the parish were much involved in quarrying, brickmaking, lime burning and boat building, as well as copper mining. The adit of one, not very successful, copper mine, Wheal Trelawny, still runs underneath part of the churchyard.

== Edgcumb Chapel ==
The Edgcumb Chapel is located in the east end of the northern aisle. It contains two monuments of the late 17th century: to Piers Edgcumb (1666) and to Jemima, Countess of Sandwich (1674).

== Rectory ==
The rectory is the work of Decimus Burton, 1853–54.
