= Albaston =

Hamlet in Cornwall, England

Coordinates: 50.5124°N 4.2254°W

Albaston: Cornish: Trevalba
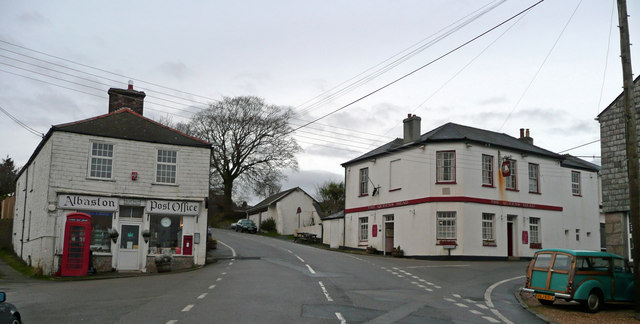
- Albaston post office and the Queen's Head pub

- Location within Cornwall
- OS grid reference: SX 423 704
- Civil parish: Calstock
- Unitary authority: Cornwall
- Ceremonial county: Cornwall
- Region: South West
- Country: England
- Sovereign state: United Kingdom
- Post town: GUNNISLAKE
- Postcode district: PL18
- Dialling code: 01822
- Police: Devon and Cornwall
- Fire: Cornwall
- Ambulance: South Western
- UK Parliament: South East Cornwall

Albaston (Cornish: Trevalba) is a hamlet in Cornwall, England, United Kingdom. It is in the civil parish of Calstock. It is located at Ordnance Survey grid reference SX 423 704.

Albaston is about 1 mile (1.6 kilometres) from the centre of Gunnislake and half-a-mile (0.7 kilometres) from Gunnislake railway station, the terminus of the Tamar Valley Line from Plymouth.

== History ==
Historically, Albaston was closely connected with the nearby mine at Drakewalls. The success of the Drakewalls mine in the late eighteenth and early nineteenth century led to the growth of the village of Albaston, including the construction of a Methodist chapel and several shops, dwellings and businesses. A brewery, Edward Bowhay & Brothers, was established by 1877; this brewery had ceased operation by 1930.

== Albaston, Chapel of Rest ==
The grave yard in front was consecrated in 1888. Outside the chapel, just inside the main gate, there is a large Granite Memorial Cross commemorating the 132 men who had made the supreme sacrifice in war. On the cross it bears the following inscription;

"Thanks be to god which giveth us the victory In glorious memory of the men from the parish of Calstock who fell in the Great War 1914 - 1918. Greater Love hath no man than this that a man lay down his life for his friends"

== Facilities ==
The village has a Methodist church, known as Tamar Valley Methodist Church. The current building was opened in 2001.

The Old Post Office House is now let as a holiday home accommodating nine people.

== Notable residents ==
Christian Pentecostal leader Thomas Ball Barratt was born in Albaston in 1862, the son of a mining engineer. He moved to Norway when his father began working for a mine there and in later life became the founder of the Norwegian Pentecostal movement.

== Cornish wrestling ==
Cornish wrestling tournaments for prizes were held at Albaston.
