= Harewood House, Calstock =

Coordinates: 50.497°N 4.210°W

Harewood House
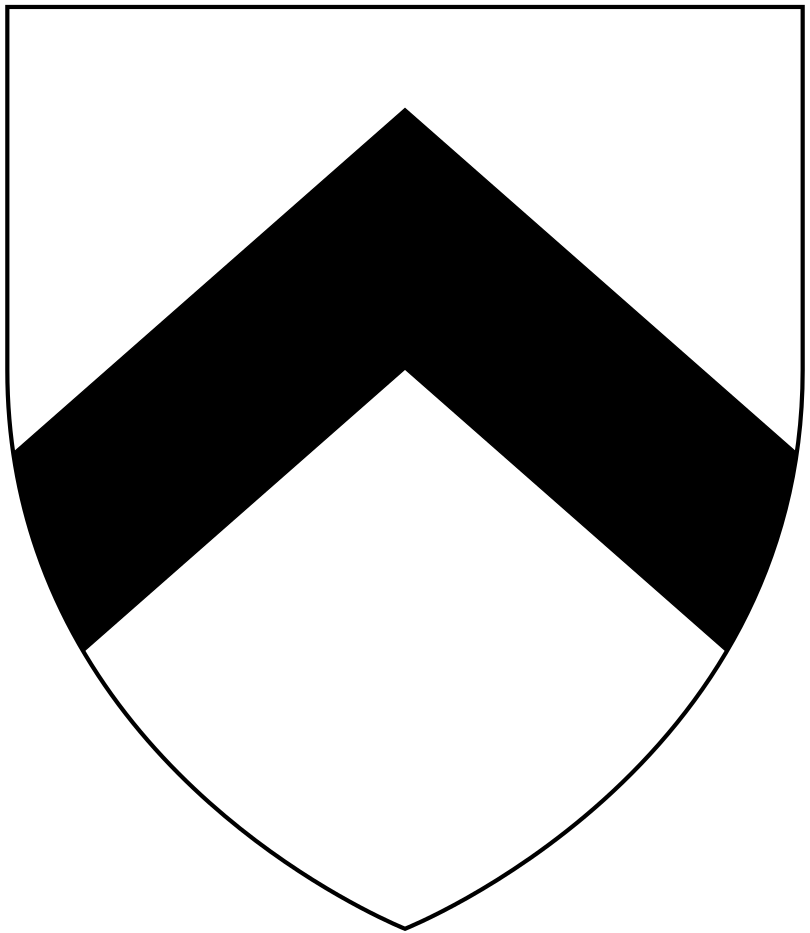
- Arms of the Trelawny family

- Location within Cornwall
- OS grid reference: SX4368
- Civil parish: Calstock
- Unitary authority: Cornwall
- Ceremonial county: Cornwall
- Region: South West
- Country: England
- Sovereign state: United Kingdom
- Post town: CALSTOCK; GUNNISLAKE
- Postcode district: PL18
- Dialling code: 01822
- Police: Devon and Cornwall
- Fire: Cornwall
- Ambulance: South Western
- UK Parliament: South East Cornwall

Harewood House was an ancient manor house, built originally by the Saxons, in Cornwall, England. Harewood Estate is surrounded by old mine workings, so the house faces towards Morwellham Quay.

== History ==
In Saxon times Calstock was in the Kingdom of Cornwall, which resisted the spread of Wessex from the east. In 838 CE Wessex had spread as far as the River Tamar, and a battle for independence was fought near Calstock. Following the Norman Conquest, Calstock manor was recorded in the Domesday Book. The Saxon manor (held by Asgar) was taken over, and in the 14th century became part of the Duchy of Cornwall: one of the 17 Antiqua maneria.

Arms of the Williams family of Scorrier, Vair, three crescents or

At the time of Domesday Book (1086) the manor was held by Reginald from Robert, Count of Mortain. There were two and a half hides of land and land for 12 ploughs. Reginald held one virgate of land with 2 ploughs and 12 serfs. 30 villeins and 30 smallholders had the rest of the land with 6 ploughs. There were 100 acres of woodland, 3 square leagues of pasture and 3 pigs. The value of the manor was £3 sterling though it had formerly been worth £6.

During the civil war, the house was commandeered by the cavalier army fighting the roundheads in Devon. The house was strategically located close to Gunnislake New Bridge, the site of the Battle of Gunnislake New Bridge on 20 July 1664. The garrison based at Harewood House was commanded by Capt. Thomas Southcot (1608-1657).

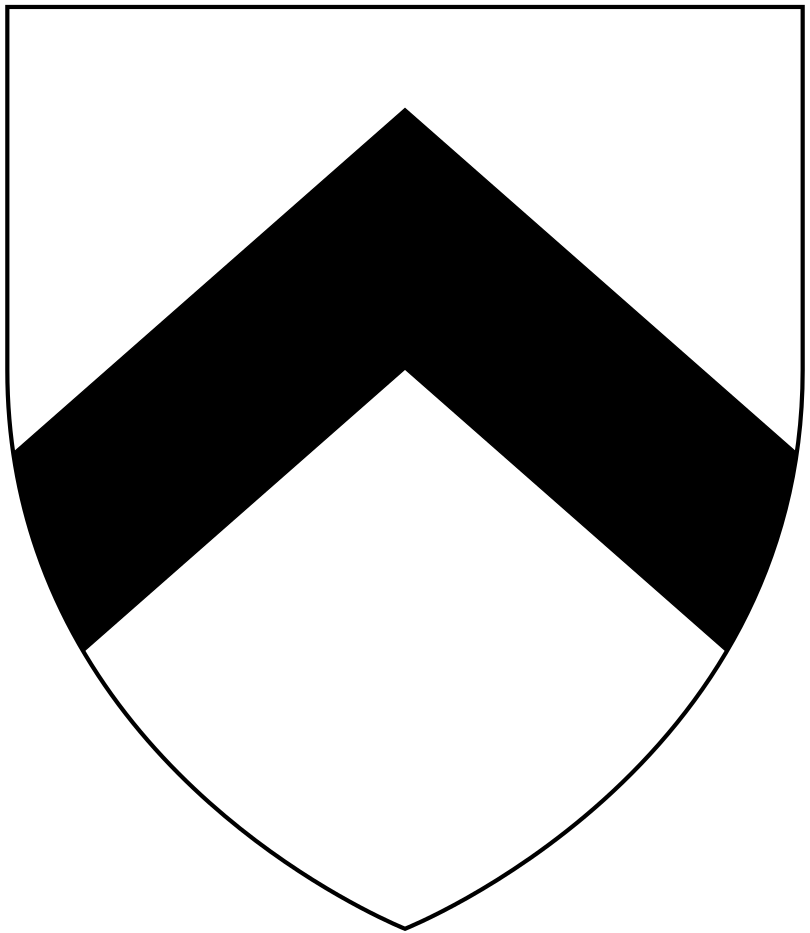
Arms of the Trelawny family, Argent, sable chevron

The manor was sold by the Duchy to John Williams of Scorrier House circa 1807. 1807 saw Sir William Lewis Salusbury-Trelawny, 8th Baronet, of the Salusbury-Trelawny baronets, purchase the estate.

== St Andrew's Parish ==
=== Granite cross ===
A granite cross at the eastern end of the churchyard marks the grave of Sir William Lewis Salusbury-Trelawny, 8th Baronet, of Harewood House, Calstock, part of Salusbury-Trelawny baronets, who was for some time the Lord Lieutenant of Cornwall and M.P. for East Cornwall. He died at Harewood in 1856, aged seventy five years. Folklore says that Sir William didn't want his body ever to leave his estate and so he was carried in through the back gate to his current resting spot, closest to his estate. Inside the church, just north of the pulpit, are two plaques:

1. At the top of one is inscribed "Laus Deo" ("Praise God"). Below that are inscribed the names of the four children of Sir William, the oldest living to just 28.
2. At the top of the other is an image of the cross, inscribed "Beneath The Cross"; below, Sir William and his wife are depicted. Below them is their fifth child, whom also died in middle age.

== Modern day ==
Harewood House has since been changed. The house is now only two storeys tall as the roof height has been lowered. The building is divided east and west by a rather out-of-place looking large stone doorway. Whilst West Harewood House is a single residential property the East comprises two.
