= Coxpark =

Hamlet in Cornwall, England

Coordinates: 50.5258°N 4.2587°W

- Location within Cornwall
- OS grid reference: SX405723
- Civil parish: Calstock
- Unitary authority: Cornwall
- Ceremonial county: Cornwall
- Region: South West
- Country: England
- Sovereign state: United Kingdom
- Post town: Gunnislake
- Postcode district: PL18 9
- Police: Devon and Cornwall
- Fire: Cornwall
- Ambulance: South Western

Coxpark is a hamlet in the parish of Calstock (where the population is included), Cornwall, England.
