= Norris Green, Cornwall =

Village in Cornwall, England

Coordinates: 50.5059°N 4.2375°W

Norris Green
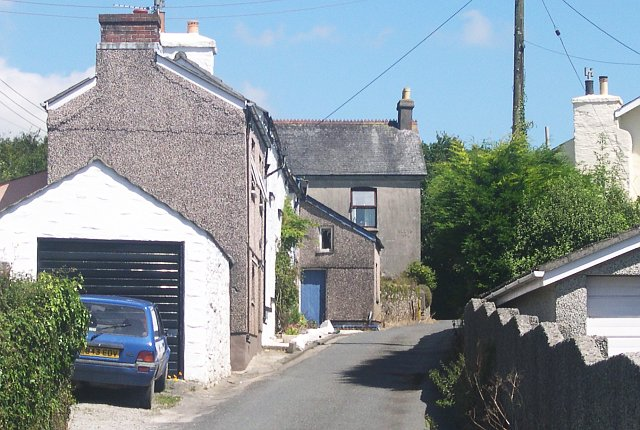
- Norris Green

- Location within Cornwall
- OS grid reference: SX418697
- Civil parish: Calstock
- Unitary authority: Cornwall
- Ceremonial county: Cornwall
- Region: South West
- Country: England
- Sovereign state: United Kingdom

Norris Green is a village in Cornwall, England, UK. It was enlarged from a farming hamlet so that it now adjoins the neighbouring village of Higher Metherell. Both settlements are within the civil parish of Calstock which borders the River Tamar, the county boundary with Devon in south-east Cornwall.

== Geography ==
Above the Tamar at an altitude of 116m. (O.S.), Norris Green comprises 29 dwellings (27 listed in the Register of Electors) and has a population hovering around 60. Fields to the east sweep down to the woods of Danescoombe, reputedly the seafaring Vikings' route of ascent from the river to Hingston Down where they are believed to have joined the Cornish Celts in their last stand against the West Saxons in 838 (Anglo-Saxon Chronicle.)

Danescombe's wooded western slope now forms part of the Cotehele estate. Cotehele House, an archetypal mediaeval stone manor house built mostly between 1485 and 1539 by the Edgcumbes, became, in 1947, the first property to be vested in the National Trust in lieu of death duties (N.T.). Cotehele Consols copper mine operated in the Combe during the nineteenth century.

Norris Green has a host offering bed and breakfast and a Caravan Club site but Metherell has two food pubs. These villages share community hall amenities, a primary school, post-office store, garden centre and farm restaurant all sited in nearby Harrowbarrow. Fuller services can be found at Callington (approximately 3 miles), Gunnislake (2 miles) or Tavistock in Devon (5 miles).
