= Calstock =

Coordinates: 50°29′49″N 4°12′36″W

Calstock: Cornish: Kalstok
- Village and civil parish
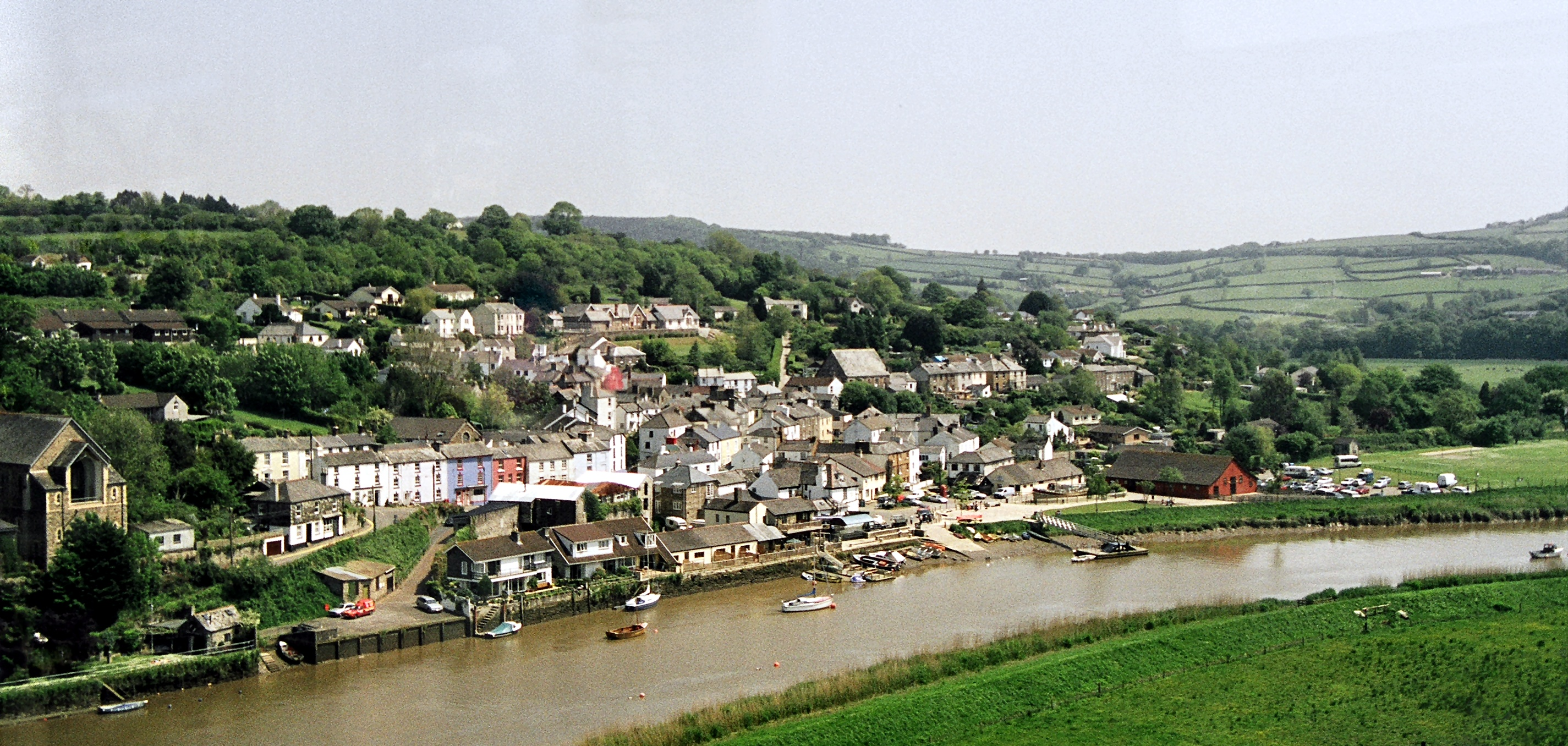
- Calstock village from the viaduct

- Location within Cornwall
- Area: 23.79 km^{2} (9.19 sq mi)
- Population: 6,253 2011 Census including Albaston, Dimson and Latchley
  - Density: 263/km^{2} (680/sq mi)
- OS grid reference: SX4368
  - London: 191 Miles
- Civil parish: Calstock
- Unitary authority: Cornwall
- Ceremonial county: Cornwall
- Region: South West
- Country: England
- Sovereign state: United Kingdom
- Post town: CALSTOCK
- Postcode district: PL18
- Dialling code: 01822
- Police: Devon and Cornwall
- Fire: Cornwall
- Ambulance: South Western
- UK Parliament: South East Cornwall
- Website: Calstock

Calstock (Cornish: Kalstok) is a civil parish and a large village in south east Cornwall, England, United Kingdom, on the border with Devon. The village is situated on the River Tamar 6 miles (9.7 km) south west of Tavistock and 10 miles (16 km) north of Plymouth.

The parish had a population of 6,095 in the 2001 census. This had increased to 6,431 at the 2011 census. The parish encompasses 5,760 acres (23.3 km^{2}) of land, 70 acres (0.28 km^{2}) of water, and 44 acres (0.18 km^{2}) of the tidal Tamar.

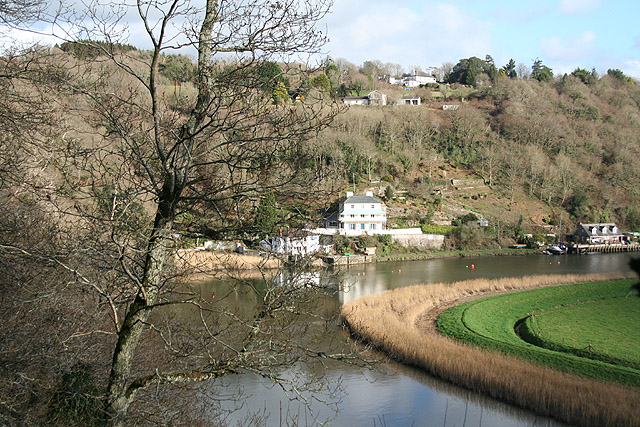
Ashburton Hotel and Danescombe Quay overlooking the River Tamar

As well as Calstock, other settlements in the parish include Albaston, Chilsworthy, Gunnislake, Harrowbarrow, Latchley, Metherell, Coxpark, Dimson, Drakewalls, Norris Green, Rising Sun and St Ann's Chapel.

Calstock village is within the Tamar Valley AONB, is overlooked by Cotehele house and gardens, and lies on the scenic Tamar Valley railway. Calstock railway station opened on 2 March 1908. The village is twinned with Saint-Thuriau in Brittany, France.

== Early history ==
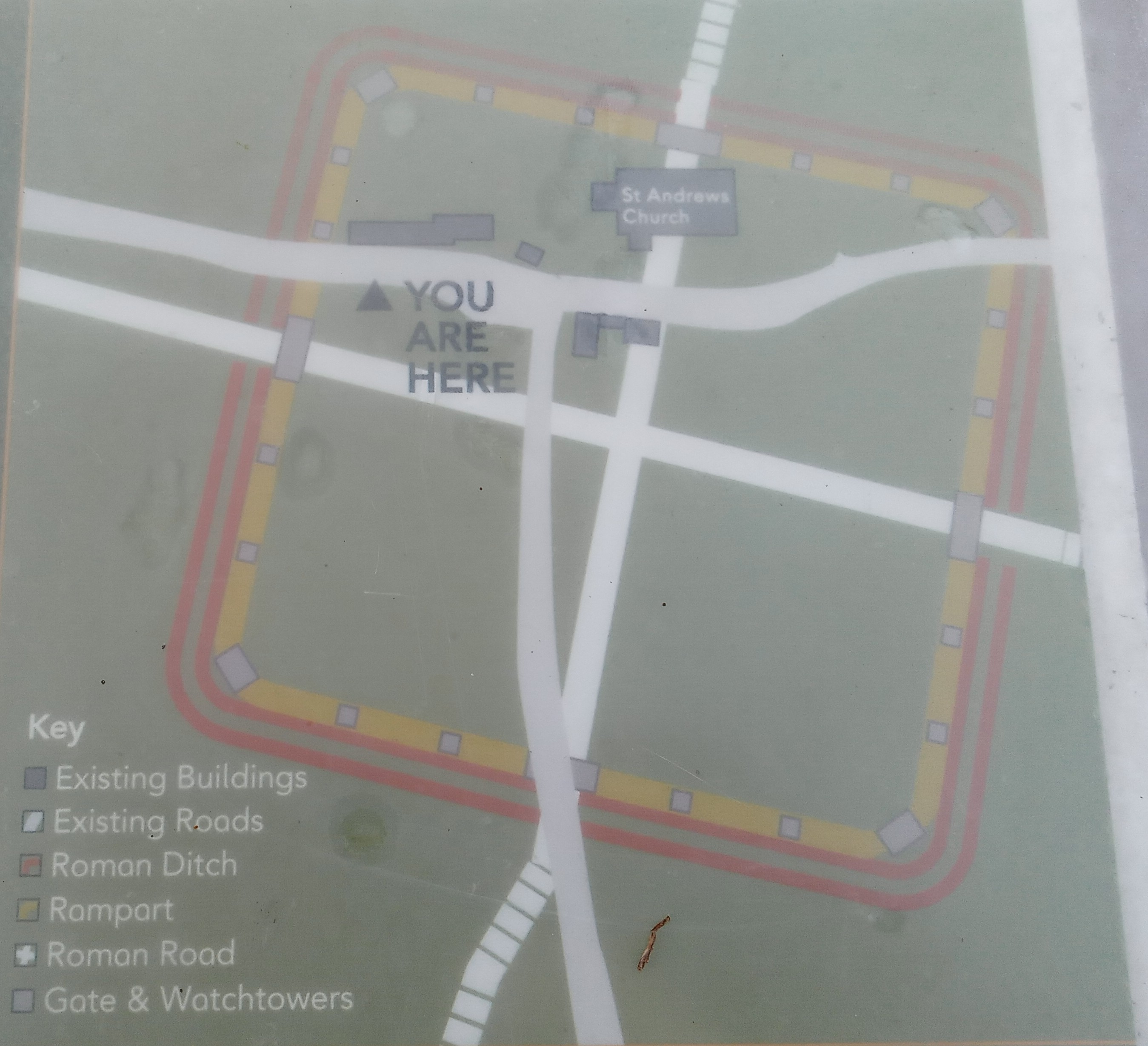
Map of the Roman Fort excavated at Calstock, Cornwall, UK (displayed on an interpretation board on the site)

Archaeological excavations and geophysical surveys on Church Hill, conducted between 2007 and 2011 by archaeologists from the University of Exeter, revealed evidences of a settled population in the Early Bronze Age (c. 2200-2000 BCE). During the Late Iron Age (500-350 BCE), the church hill was surrounded by an enclosure. It is possible that the Romans reused this Iron Age hill fort when they set up their own, albeit smaller, squared Roman fort measuring about 170 m × 160 m (560 ft × 520 ft). This fort, discovered during the same excavation, is only the third known in Cornwall, and the largest. The fort was likely established in about 50/55 CE, contemporaneously with a legionary fortress at Exeter. It is thought that up to 500 soldiers would have been based here. More recent excavations have revealed the presence of a Roman mine consisting of pits connected by a network of tunnels. There is also evidence of a Roman road in the vicinity. The fort was occupied for about thirty years: in 75 CE, the Legio II Augusta moved on to South Wales, leaving auxiliary units behind in Devon and Cornwall. The site was probably abandoned around 80/85 CE, buildings were disassembled and demolished and the ramparts and ditches levelled. Only from the 8th century CE onwards, was the hill again populated. Part of the Roman site is now occupied by St Andrew's Church and the cemeteries; an interpretation board at the entrance to the cemetery opposite the church gives more details.

In Saxon times, Calstock was in the Kingdom of Cornwall, which resisted the spread of Wessex from the east. In 838 CE, Wessex had spread as far as the Tamar, and a battle for independence was fought near Calstock. Following the Norman Conquest, Calstock manor was recorded in the Domesday Book, referred to as Callestock. The Saxon manor (held by Asgar) was taken over, and in the 14th century became part of the Duchy of Cornwall: one of the 17 Antiqua maneria. At the time of Domesday Book (1086), the manor was held by Reginald from Robert, Count of Mortain. There were two and a half hides of land and land for 12 ploughs. Reginald held one virgate of land with two ploughs and 12 serfs. Thirty villeins and 30 smallholders had the rest of the land with six ploughs. There were 100 acres of woodland, 3 square leagues of pasture and three pigs. The value of the manor was £3 sterling, though it had formerly been worth £6. The manor was sold by the Duchy to John Williams of Scorrier House circa 1807.

During the English Civil War, Calstock became a garrison of the Royalists in Cornwall, consisting of roughly 1,200 Cornishmen. The force was quartered at Cotehele and Harewood House. During the civil war, the Parliamentarians attacked Gunnislake New Bridge; it was defended by Sir Richard Grenville and Captain Southcote with men from their garrison at Calstock. At the cost of 240 men, the bridge was lost to the Parliamentarian forces, however they failed to advance further into Cornwall. Calstock and Cornwall were commended by King Charles I for their loyalty and the King's letter to the Cornish people is still displayed at St Andrew's Church, Calstock.

== Industries ==
=== Mining ===
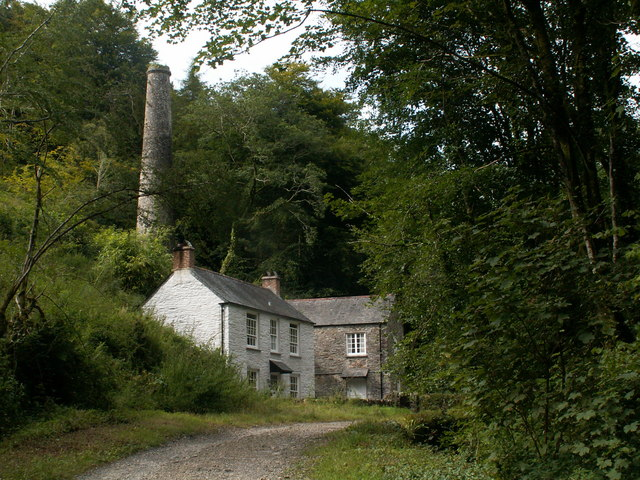
Cotehele Consols captain's house and wheel house, now holiday homes on the Cotehele Estate.

Mining was important in Calstock from Mediaeval times, with the Duchy mining silver. The industry was booming in the late 19th century, and the discovery of copper, coupled with nearby granite quarrying, made Calstock a busy port. The rapid population boom due to the growth of industry led, in 1849, to an outbreak of cholera. The industry declined in the early 20th century due to foreign competition, and now only the ruined pump houses that dot the landscape remain.

Calstock had much mining activity, principally;

- Cotehele Consol - copper and arsenic
- Calstock Consol - copper
- Okeltor Consol - copper, tin and arsenic, mined silver and copper up until 1877
- Wheal Trelawny - copper, very close to Okeltor Consols
- Danescombe Mines - copper, tin and arsenic
- Wheal Zion - copper
- Wheal Edward - copper and arsenic
- Wheal Arthur - copper and arsenic, directly east of Wheal Edward

=== Transport ===
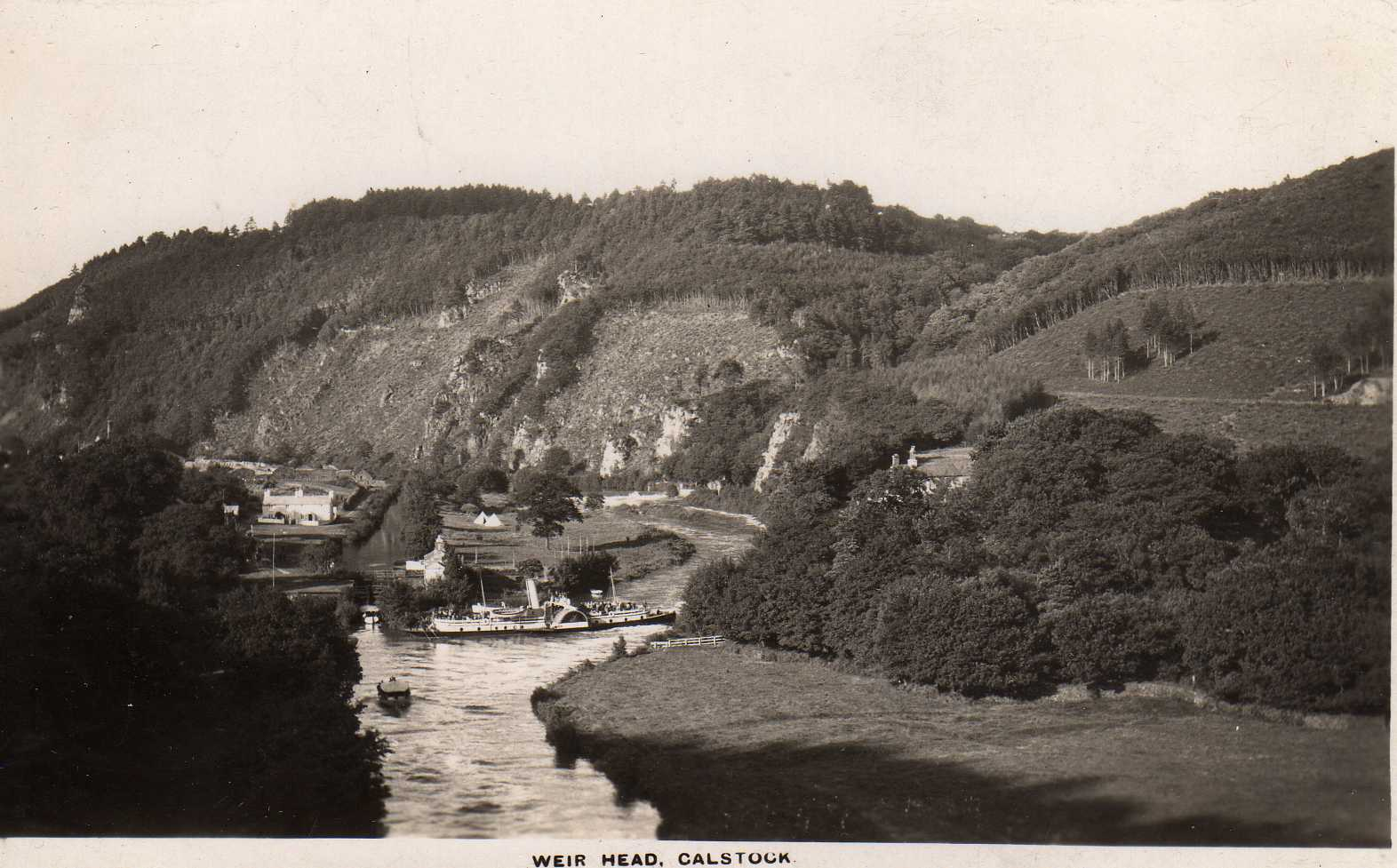
PS Alexandra at Weir Head, upstream of Calstock, in 1906

The Tamar is navigable to boats past Calstock some 3 miles (4.8 km) upstream to Morwellham Quay with some 10 feet (3.0 m) or even 20 feet (6.1 m) of water at extreme spring tides. Calstock Quay and Danescombe Quay were once important for transporting minerals from the various mines in the area. In the Victorian era when steamers brought tourists to the village, Calstock was visited by Queen Victoria and Prince Albert in 1846. Tourist boats still operate from Plymouth as far as Cotehele in the summer months. The importance of the river as a transport route declined with the construction of the 14 miles (23 km) Tamar Valley railway at the start of the 20th century. The village is still dominated by the railway's viaduct.

=== Boat building ===
The river has its own unique design of craft, The Tamar barge. Calstock had two main boat builders, Goss's Yard, which built the West Country Ketch Garlandstone, now at Morwellham Quay industrial museum, and May's Yard, in the Danescombe Valley. Garlandstone was, unusually, built as a speculative venture by James Goss to keep his men employed at a period of diminishing repair work following the run down and closure of Morwellham Quay. A surviving Tamar barge, Shamrock, is preserved by the National Trust and National Maritime Museum at Cotehele Quay. A second barge, Lynher, also built by James Goss, is privately owned at Cremyll

=== Lime production ===
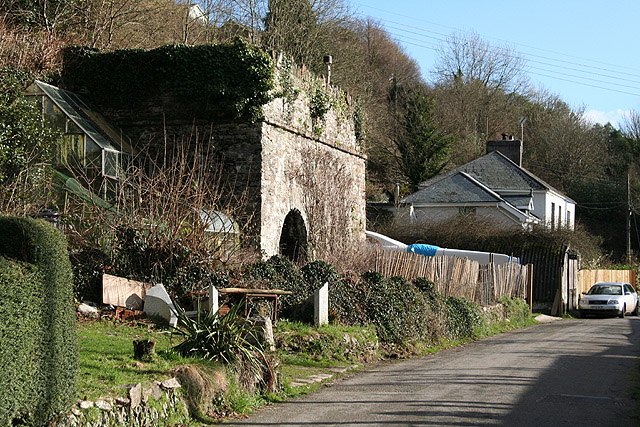
Calstock's Lower Kelly lime kiln, opposite Calstock boatyard

There are four sets of lime kilns at Calstock and more at Cotehele Quay. Further kilns were located at various points along the river. The burning of lime was a major industry in the area in the 19th century. The limestone was delivered to the kilns by boat but the resulting lime was shipped out to the various farms by horse and cart. It was used as a fertiliser, an ingredient in paint and as a mortar for bricklaying.

== Churches ==
=== Parish church of St Andrew ===
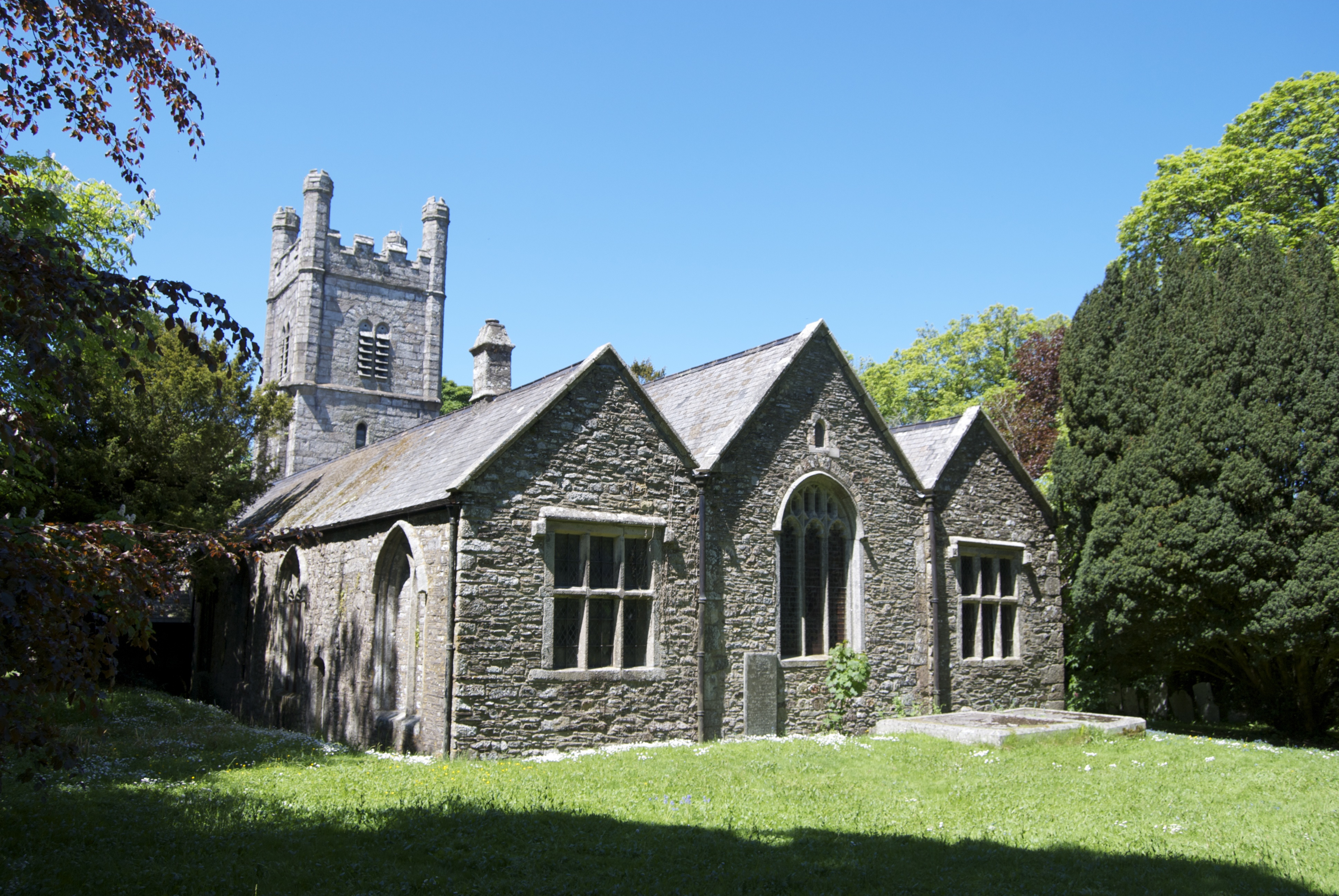
St Andrew's Church, after the grave stones were moved in 1967

The church is said to have been consecrated about 1290. Nothing obvious remains of this period, but the pillars and arches to the north of the centre aisle of the present building are early 14th century. About 1420 the south aisle was added, and the whole church re-roofed. In 1861, an architectural survey of the diocese of Exeter noted that the whole church was in a sad state. This resulted in the thorough restoration of 1867, the floor levels were altered, the existing tiles relaid, the chancel given its present roof, and the building furnished with plain pitched-pine benches. Although the restoration was severe, many of the interesting features of the church were preserved. In addition, three chapels-of-ease were built at Gunnislake, Harrowbarrow and Latchley; these chapels were needed because of the increase in population for the mines of the parish.

The arms of the Diocese of Truro, to which the Parish of Calstock belongs

=== St. Anne's, Gunnislake ===
The land was bought on 29 January 1879. The total cost of the building was £2,400 of which the Duke of Bedford gave £500 and the Church building society gave £200. The foundation stone of the church was laid by the Dowager Countess of Mount Edgcumbe, at 3pm on Tuesday, 30 September 1879. The building was designed by J. Piers St Aubyn and was consecrated by Edward Benson, the Bishop of Truro, in 1880. It was dedicated to St. Anne because of an ancient local holy well, close to the site of the church. The church seats up to 225 worshippers. In 1918 Gunnislake made an appeal to become its own separate parish but failed to raise the necessary funds.

=== All Saints, Harrowbarrow ===
In 1870, a parishioner presented the rector with a piece of land, near the Prince of Wales Mine. The church was designed by J. Piers St Aubyn; it was built as a school and a mission chapel for £700. The church seats up to 80 worshippers.

=== Albaston Chapel ===
The graveyard in front was consecrated in 1888. Outside the chapel, just inside the main gate, there is a large granite memorial cross commemorating 132 men who made the supreme sacrifice in war. The cross bears the following inscription;

Thanks be to God which giveth us the victory. In glorious memory of the men from the parish of Calstock who fell in the Great War 1914–1918. Greater Love hath no man than this that a man lay down his life for his friends.

=== St Michael and All Angels, Latchley Church ===
In 1879, the "foundation stone of our long wished for church was laid". Latchley church was designed by Piers St Aubyn, the same architect as Gunnislake. It was built three years later than Gunnislake at a cost of £1,147 as a chapel-of-ease dedicated to St Michael and All Angels. It was dedicated by the Bishop of Truro on 20 July 1883. After a bad attack of woodworm to the building in August 1968. it was closed to worshippers. In 1985, it was sold and used for a dwelling.

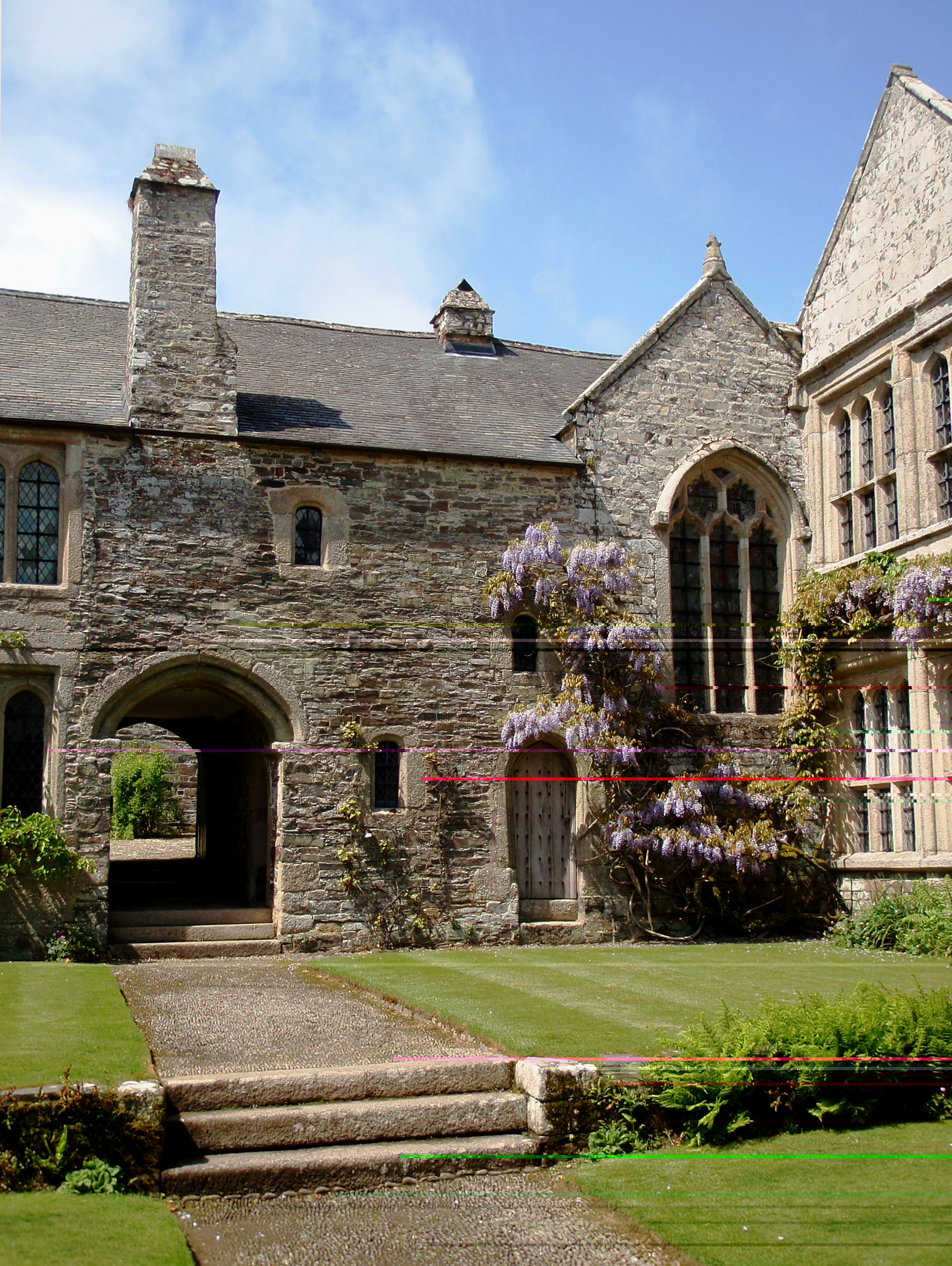
Chapel west window facing the courtyard

=== Cotehele's chapels ===
==== St. Katharine, House Chapel Cotehele ====
In Cotehele, on the west side of Hall Court is the vicarage and chapel. The chapel, dedicated to St. Katharine and St. Anne, is connected to the main building via a small passageway leading to the dining room. The chapel is one of the oldest rooms in the house, alongside the Great Hall. It still has the original clock, a rare example from the Tudor period, still in operation today.

==== St. Thomas Becket, Woodland Chapel Cotehele ====
In the grounds of Cotehele, directly East of the House close to the River Tamar, lies a chapel. Inside there are pews going around the walls, two minister's benches and a table. The patron saint of the chapel is St. Thomas Becket.

== Cornish wrestling ==
Cornish wrestling prize tournaments were held at the Bridge Inn in Calstock in the 1800s and 1900s. Tournaments were also held at St Ann's Chapel and Albaston

== Primary school ==
Calstock Community Primary School was built in 1901 and opened on 6 January 1902. At that time, the school consisted of just two main classrooms. It has since been extended with the addition of the infant suite which won an award for architectural design, in keeping with the remainder of the school. The centenary of the school was celebrated in the summer of 2002. In 2014, Stoke Climsland School federated with Calstock to pool resources. The vast majority of pupils continue their education at Callington Community College or Devonport High School for Boys / Girls.

== Railway ==
=== East Cornwall Mineral Railway ===
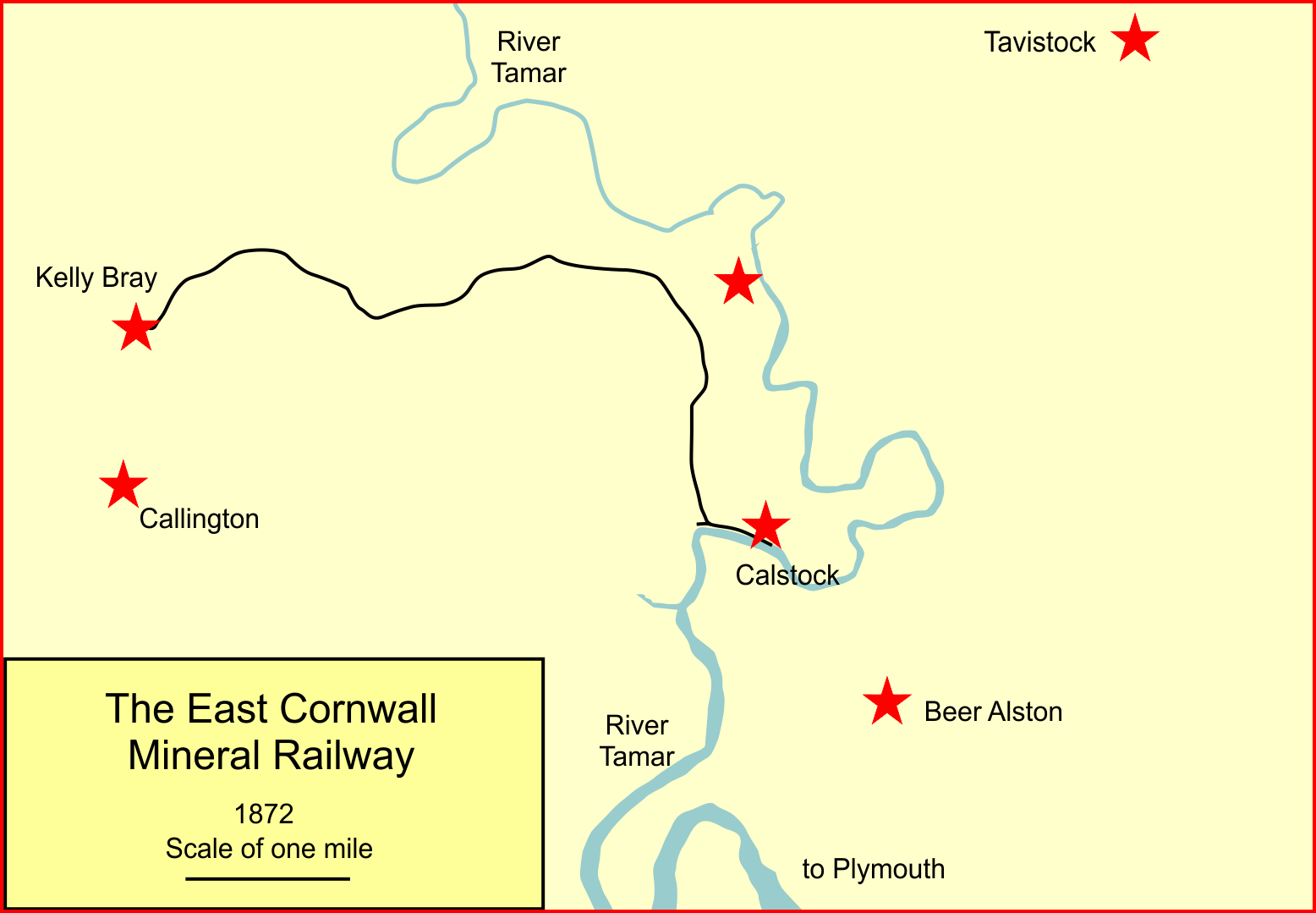
Map of the East Cornwall Mineral Railway

The East Cornwall Mineral Railway was a 1,067 mm (3 ft 6 in) gauge railway line, opened in 1872 to connect mines and quarries in the Callington and Gunnislake areas in east Cornwall with shipping at Calstock on the River Tamar. The line included a rope-worked incline to descend to the quay at Calstock. Wagons with goods from the mines around Gunnislake and Callington were brought down the hillside on a 0.4 miles (0.6 km) cable-worked incline with a gradient of 1 in 6 (17%).

Following the opening of the LSWR mainline railway at nearby Bere Alston, a connecting line from there to Calstock was opened, and the existing line converted to standard gauge, opening throughout as a passenger line in 1908. When rural lines in the area were closed in the 1960s under the Beeching Axe, a short section of the original ECMR line was retained to keep open a connection from Plymouth to Gunnislake, and that section remains open.

=== Calstock Viaduct ===
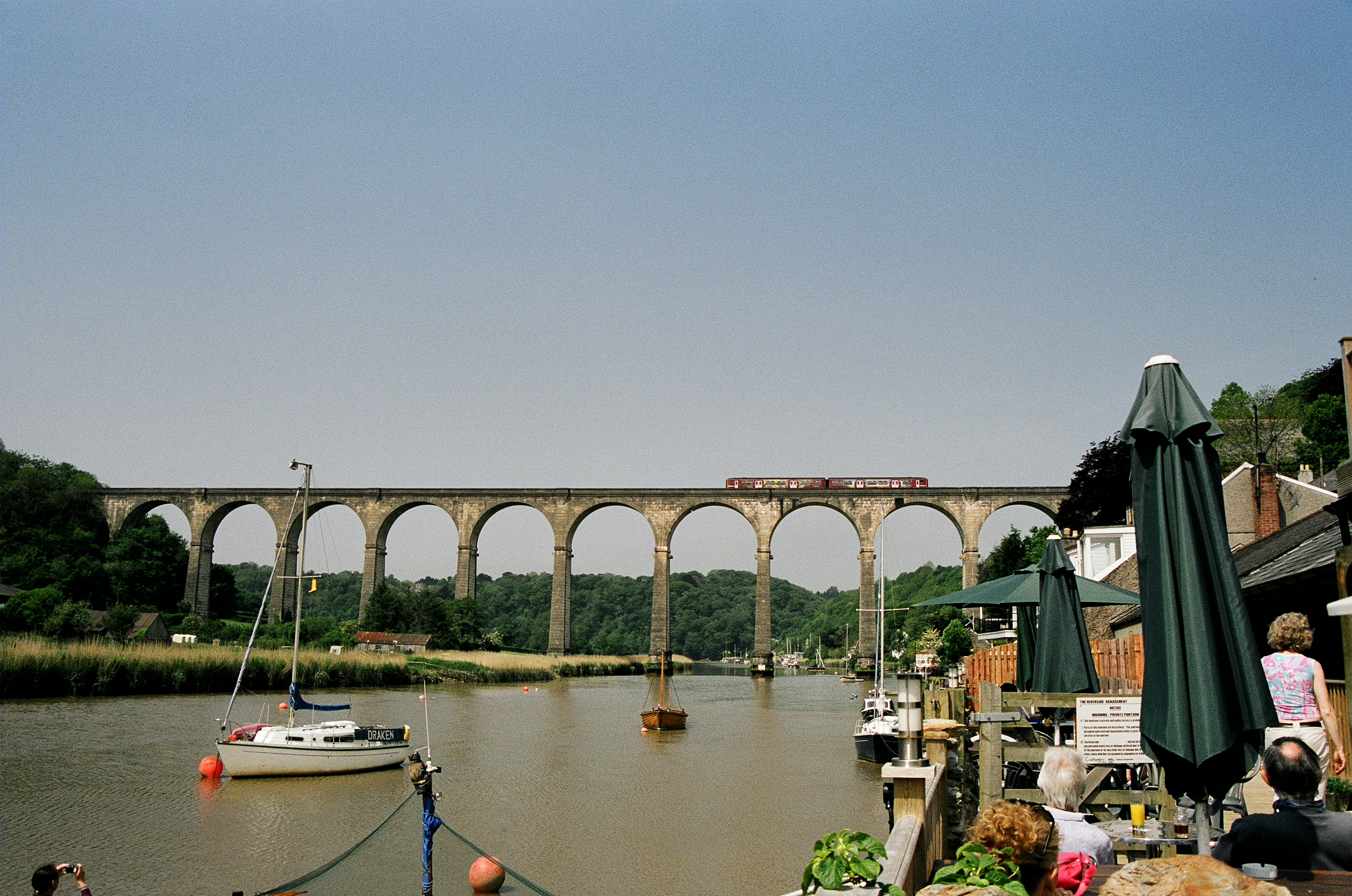
Calstock Viaduct

The viaduct is 120 feet (37 m) high with twelve 60 feet (18 m) wide arches, and a further small arch in the Calstock abutment. Three of the piers stand in the River Tamar, which is tidal at this point and has a minimum clearance at high tide of 110 feet (34 m).

It was built between 1904 and 1907 by John Lang of Liskeard using 11,148 concrete blocks. These were cast in a temporary yard on the Devon bank opposite the village. The engineers were Richard Church and W. R. Galbraith. The viaduct was first crossed by truck on 8 August 1907 and first used by passengers on 2 March 1908.

It is a Grade II* listed structure.

=== Services ===
Calstock is served by trains on the Tamar Valley Line from Gunnislake to Plymouth. Connections with main line services can be made at Plymouth, although a small number of Tamar Valley services continue to or from Exeter St Davids.

== Ferry ==
The Calstock Ferry operates between Calstock and Ferry Farm on the Devon side of the Tamar. The service resumed in May 2025 after a ten-year absence. The new ferry is entirely solar-powered. It can be used by walkers on the Tamara Coast to Coast Way to avoid a long detour via Bere Alston station.

== Literary associations ==
The poetry publisher Peterloo Poets, founded by Harry Chambers, was based in Calstock until it closed down in 2009. Peterloo Poets was formerly based at Liskeard. In 2010 Chambers was honoured for services to Poetry in the New Year Honours.

== Local establishments ==
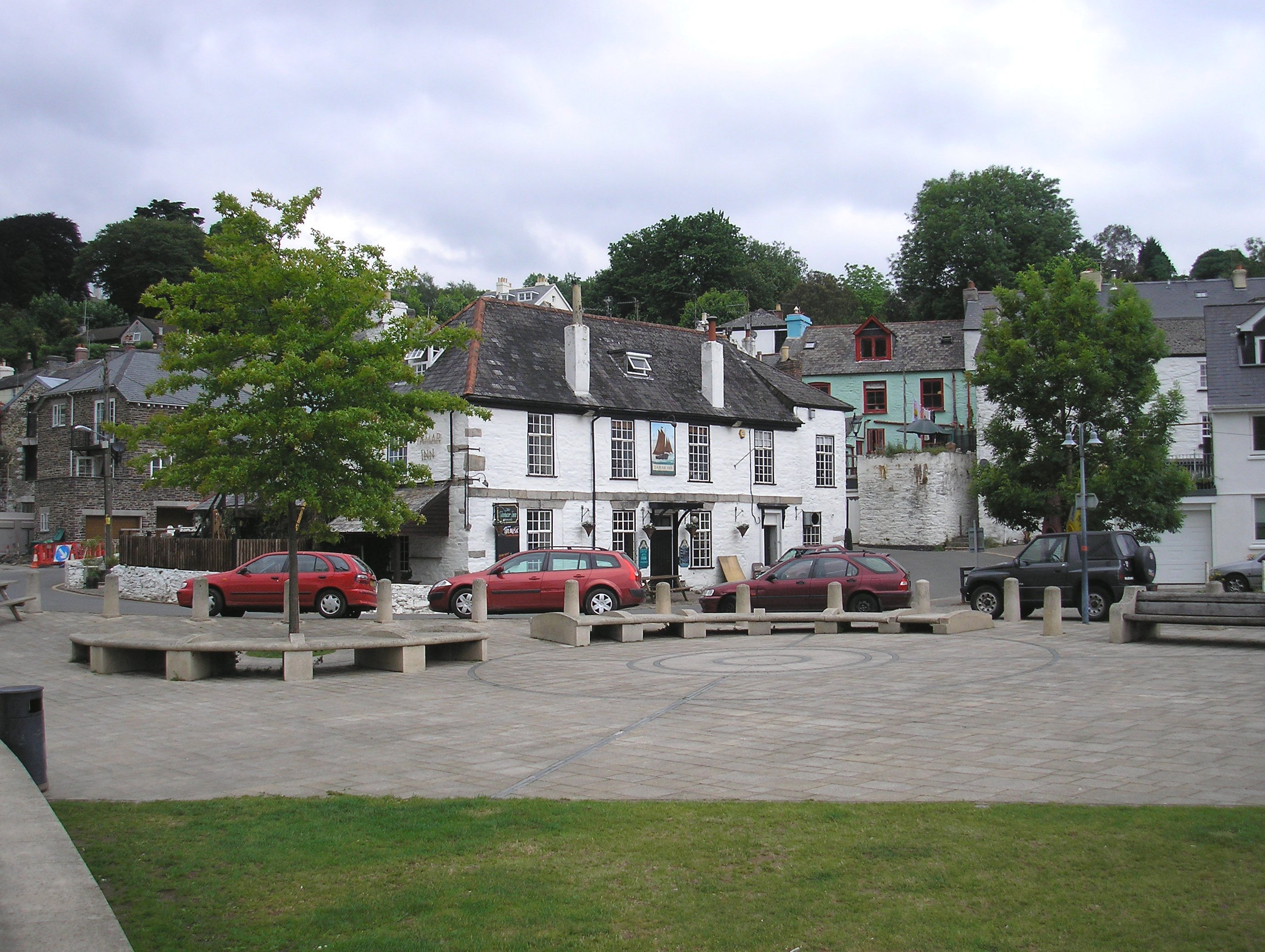
The Tamar Inn overlooking the quay at Calstock

During Victorian times, the parish had "13 churches and 13 taverns." Currently, the parish only has four churches and nine taverns. These include the Tamar Inn, on Calstock Quay, which dates from the 17th century and was rumoured to be the haunt of smugglers and highwaymen, and the Boot Inn, in the centre of the village, built in the year 1666.

Calstock Arts hosts a wide variety of art and music events and exhibitions in the Old Chapel.

Calstock has a non-league football club, playing in the second division of the Duchy League. Their home ground is on Calstock Quay by the banks of the River Tamar. The club's nickname, The Bees, and logo are derived from Cornwall's county colours of black and gold. The club is run by local volunteers and is sponsored by the Tamar Inn, also located on Calstock Quay.

== Governance ==
In 1894, the parish was made its own rural district, Calstock Rural District, at the time Calstock had a large population. In 1934, the rural district was abolished and amalgamated with Callington Urban District to form St Germans Rural District. Then in 1974, the St Germans Rural District was amalgamated with Liskeard Rural District to form Caradon. In 2009, Caradon was abolished so that the whole of Cornwall was governed by one unitary authority, Cornwall Council.

=== Parish Council ===
Calstock Parish Council forms the lowest tier of local government. The parish council was established in 1934, after Calstock Rural District was amalgamated the parish with the Rural District of St Germans.

Eighteen councillors are elected or co-opted from the five wards of the parish - Calstock, Chilsworthy, Delaware, Gunnislake and Harrowbarrow. The council meets at the Tamar Valley Centre in Drakewalls.

Coat of arms of Calstock Parish Council

Adopted
2016; 10 years ago
Escutcheon
Sable, Cross Argent, Calstock Viaduct Argent, Two Strawberries Gules, Daffodil Or, Engine House Argent and Picaxe Argent

=== Cornwall Council ===
For elections to Cornwall Council, Calstock is an electoral division represented by one member on the council. Dorothy Kirk of the Labour Party has been the councillor since 2021. Before 2021, Calstock was in the Gunnislake and Calstock electoral division.

== Freemasonry ==
Calstock has always had a strong masonic presence. Cotehele Lodge No. 2166 was Warranted in June 1886 and Consecrated in April 1887 at Cotehele House. It was founded by twelve local men and was greatly supported by the then Provincial Grand Master, the Earl of Mount Edgcumbe. In August 1900, Cotehele Lodge moved to the purpose built Calstock Masonic Hall, on Commercial Road, which was opened by Sir Philip Colville Smith. The Lodge has continued to meet there since its construction.

== Twin towns ==
- Saint-Thuriau, Brittany

== Places of interest ==
Key
	Abbey/Priory/Cathedral
Accessible open space	Accessible open space
	Amusement/Theme Park
	Castle
Country Park	Country Park
	English Heritage
	Forestry Commission
Heritage railway	Heritage railway
Historic house	Historic House
Places of Worship	Places of Worship
Museum (free) Museum	Museum (free/not free)
National Trust	National Trust
	Theatre
	Zoo

- Cotehele House
- Calstock Roman Fort
- Calstock Viaduct
- Danescombe Quay
- Tamar Valley Centre
- Calstock Parish Archives
- The Shamrock

== See also ==
- Calstock railway station
- East Cornwall Mineral Railway
- Tamar Valley Line
- Harewood House and Estate
- River Tamar
