= St Dominic, Cornwall =

Village in Cornwall, England

Coordinates: 50.489°N 4.257°W

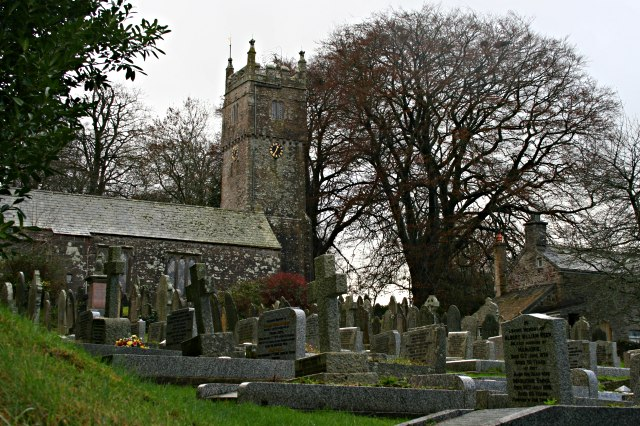
St Dominic Parish Church

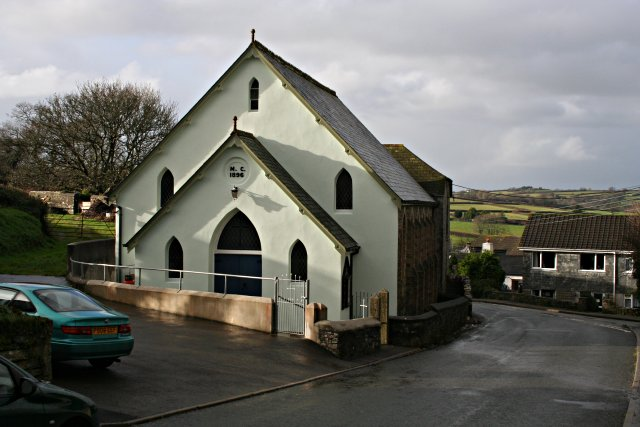
St Dominic Methodist Church

St Dominic (Cornish: Sen Domynek) is a civil parish and village in Cornwall, England, United Kingdom. The village is situated 2 1/2 miles (4.0 km) east of Callington and five miles (8 km) north of Saltash.

St Dominick is the historic spelling but this is gradually changing to drop the letter K. It is still spelt with the K on Ordnance Survey mapping, and in the name of an electoral division, St Dominick, Harrowbarrow and Kelly Bray, but Cornwall Council spells the parish name without the K.

St Dominic parish is bounded by Calstock parish to the north, by the River Tamar and border with Devon to the east, by St Mellion parish to the south and by Callington parish to the west. The ecclesiastical parish is named after a female saint, St Dominica, and is in the Deanery and Hundred of East. The parish is also in the Registration District of St Germans (however, historic birth and death registers are in Liskeard and marriage registers in St Germans). The population of the parish was 833 in the 2001 census. This included Bohetherick but had decreased slightly to 799 at the 2011 census.

The parish church is dedicated to St Dominica and has two aisles. The south aisle is the earlier of the two; the tower (of the 13th century) is of an unusual design. A dedication to St. Dominic was added in 1963 by the Bishop of Truro. St Dominic Parish Council has ten councillors and meets monthly in the village hall. The council members are sole trustees of the village hall

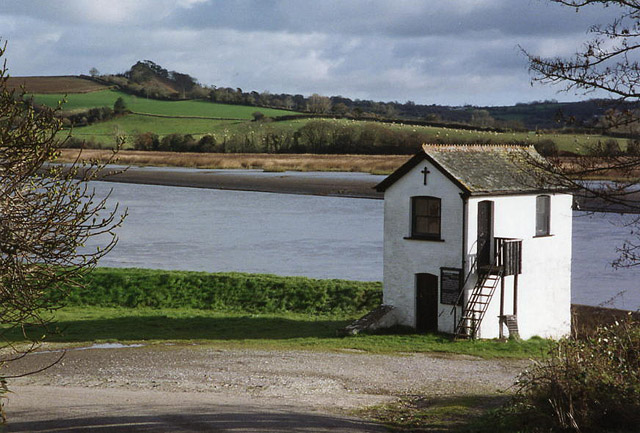
Halton Quay Chapel

As well as the churchtown the parish settlements include Burraton, Bohetheric (also known as Etheric), and Halton Quay where there is an Anglican chapel. A National Trust house, Cotehele, lies north of St Dominic. A history of St Dominic post office was published in 1988.

Charles Fitzgeoffrey (1576–1638), a poet, was vicar of St Dominic in the early 17th century.
