= Saint-Thuriau =

Saint-Thuriau Sant-Turiav
- Commune
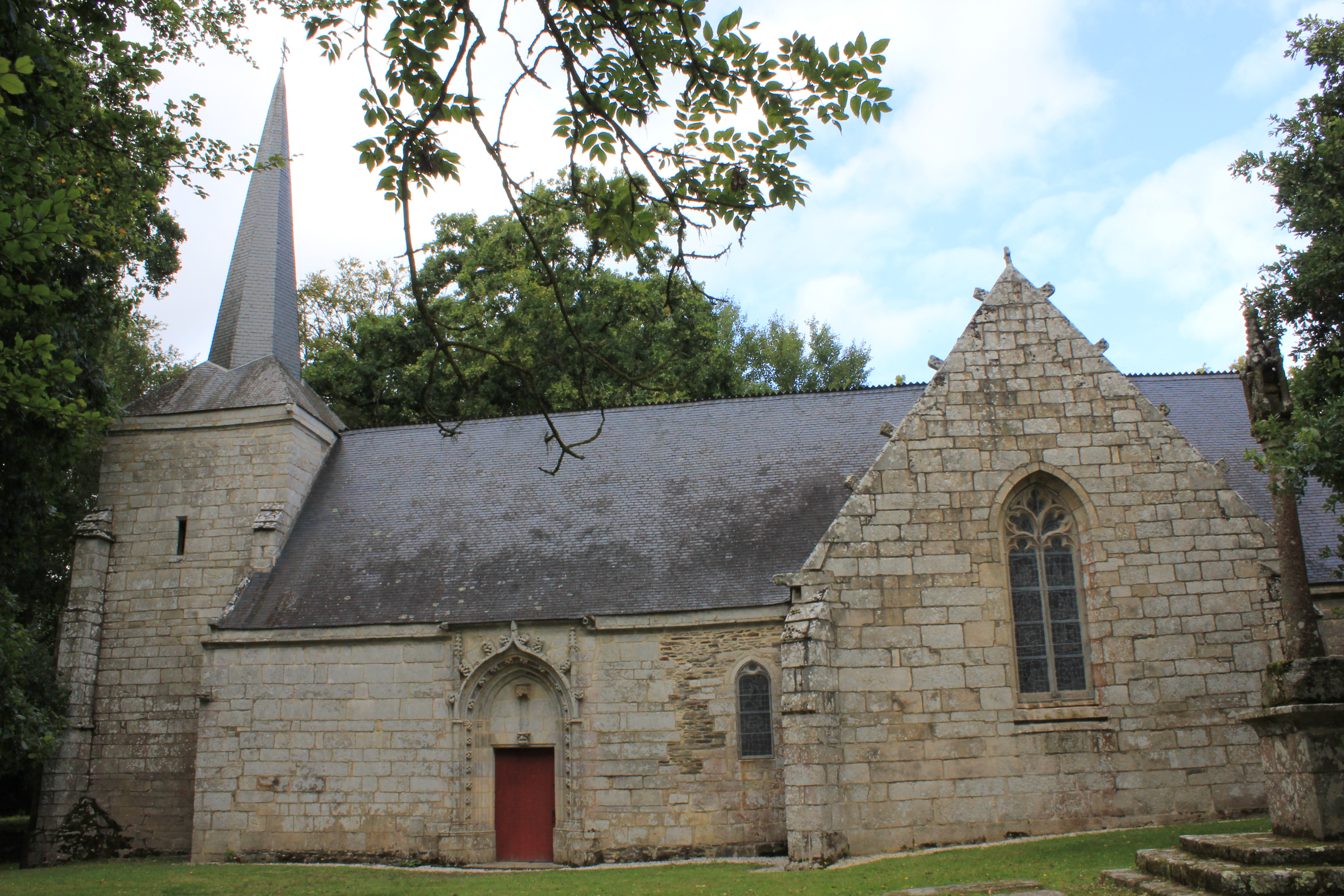
- The Chapel of Cohazé

- Coat of arms
- Location of Saint-Thuriau
- Location within France Location within Brittany
- Coordinates: 48°01′05″N 2°56′57″W
- Country: France
- Region: Brittany
- Department: Morbihan
- Arrondissement: Pontivy
- Canton: Pontivy
- Intercommunality: Pontivy Communauté

Government
  - Mayor (2026–32): Laurence Marivain
- Area^{1}: 21.47 km^{2} (8.29 sq mi)
- Highest elevation: 129 m (423 ft)
- Lowest elevation: 48 m (157 ft)
- Population (2023): 1,885
  - Density: 87.80/km^{2} (227.4/sq mi)
- Time zone: UTC+01:00 (CET)
  - Summer (DST): UTC+02:00 (CEST)
- INSEE/Postal code: 56237 /56300
- ^{1} French Land Register data, which excludes lakes, ponds, glaciers > 1 km^{2} (0.386 sq mi or 247 acres) and river estuaries.

Saint-Thuriau (French pronunciation: [sɛ̃ tyʁjo]; Breton: Sant-Turiav) is a commune in the Morbihan department of Brittany in north-western France. Inhabitants of Saint-Thuriau are called in French Thuriaviens or Thurialais.

It takes its name from Saint Turiaf of Dol, bishop of the ancient Diocese of Dol.

== Twinning ==
- (United Kingdom) Calstock, Cornwall, UK

== See also ==
- Communes of the Morbihan department
