= Rising Sun, Cornwall =

Coordinates: 50.512°N 4.262°W

Rising Sun
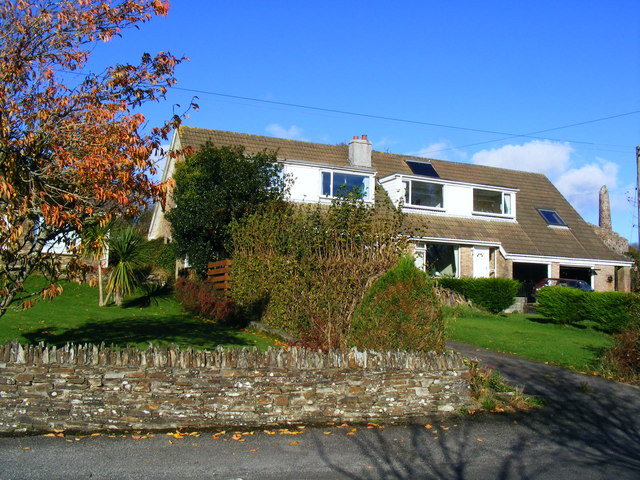
- Houses at Rising Sun

- Location within Cornwall
- OS grid reference: SX397705
- Unitary authority: Cornwall
- Ceremonial county: Cornwall
- Region: South West
- Country: England
- Sovereign state: United Kingdom

Rising Sun is a hamlet near Calstock in Cornwall, England.
