= Gunnislake Newbridge =

Bridge in Cornwall and Devon, England

Coordinates: 50.5286°N 4.21194°W

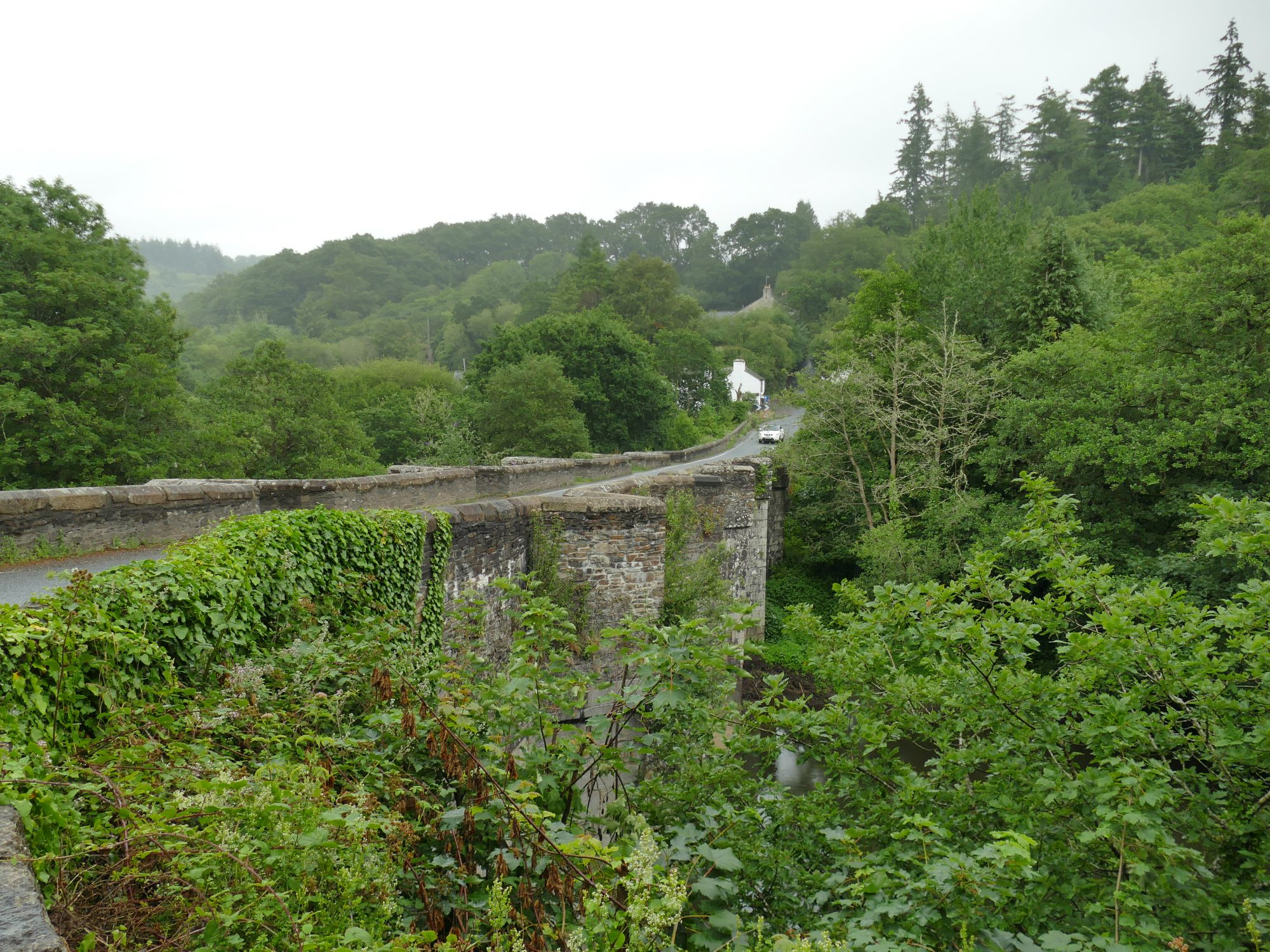
View in 2023 looking east from Cornwall towards Devon

Gunnislake Newbridge or New Bridge is a large stone arch bridge in the west of England, crossing the River Tamar between Gunnislake, Cornwall and Gulworthy, Devon. The bridge is located in a narrow river valley with woodland and high ground on either side. The bridge is single-track width for vehicles with refuges that protect pedestrians.

== History ==
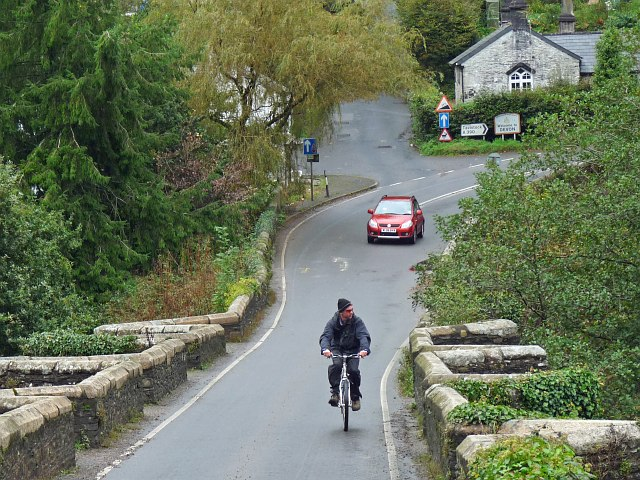
View of parapets

It was commissioned by local landowner Piers Edgecumbe, built around 1520, and rebuilt around 1773. It has six arches.

The name "Newbridge" may refer to it being built later than two medieval bridges upriver which are slightly less than a century older, Horsebridge and Greystone Bridge. Engineering historian Bill Harvey interprets the name as referring to the current structure having replaced an earlier one on the same site apart from one surviving pointed arch; Thomas interprets this arch (the first starting from the Devon bank) as the one remaining from Edgecumbe's original bridge, with the rest rebuilt in 1773.

The Battle of Gunnislake New Bridge took place at the bridge in 1644. It is currently grade I listed. A nineteenth-century toll house is located on the Devon side and is listed grade II separately.

== Current use ==
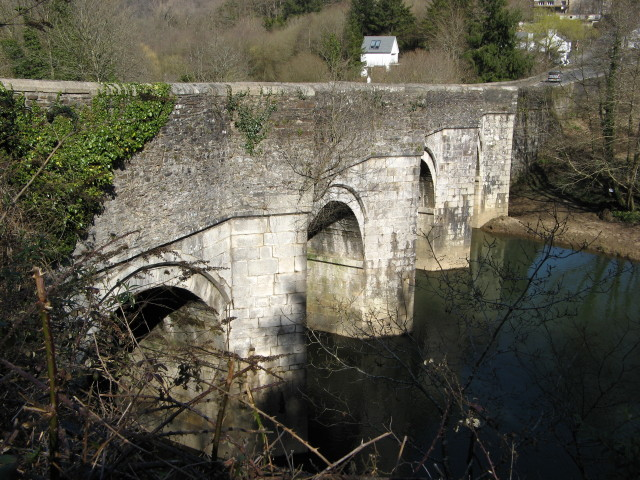
Winter view of the arches

The bridge continues to be used for road traffic and currently carries the A390 road. The crossing was formerly a relatively major route for road traffic into Cornwall bypassing Plymouth, as it was the lowest road bridge across the Tamar until the Tamar Bridge opened in the 1960s. Steel plates were added to the upstream cutwaters to shield from debris in 2024.

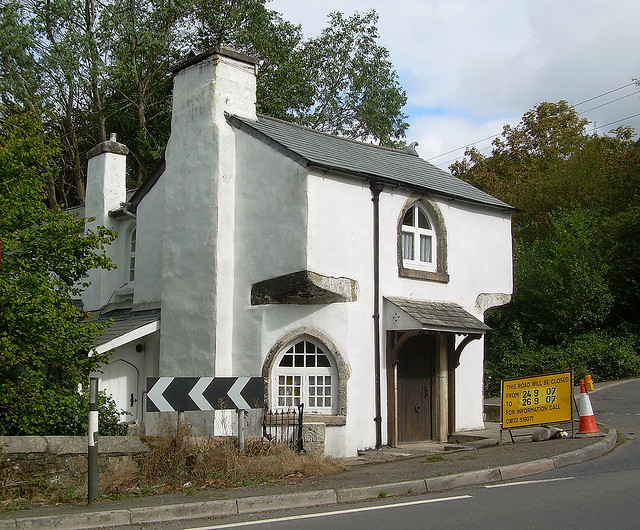
Former toll house on east bank
