= Chilsworthy, Cornwall =

Village in Cornwall, England

Coordinates: 50.528°N 4.240°W

Chilsworthy: Cornish: Karjyl
- Village
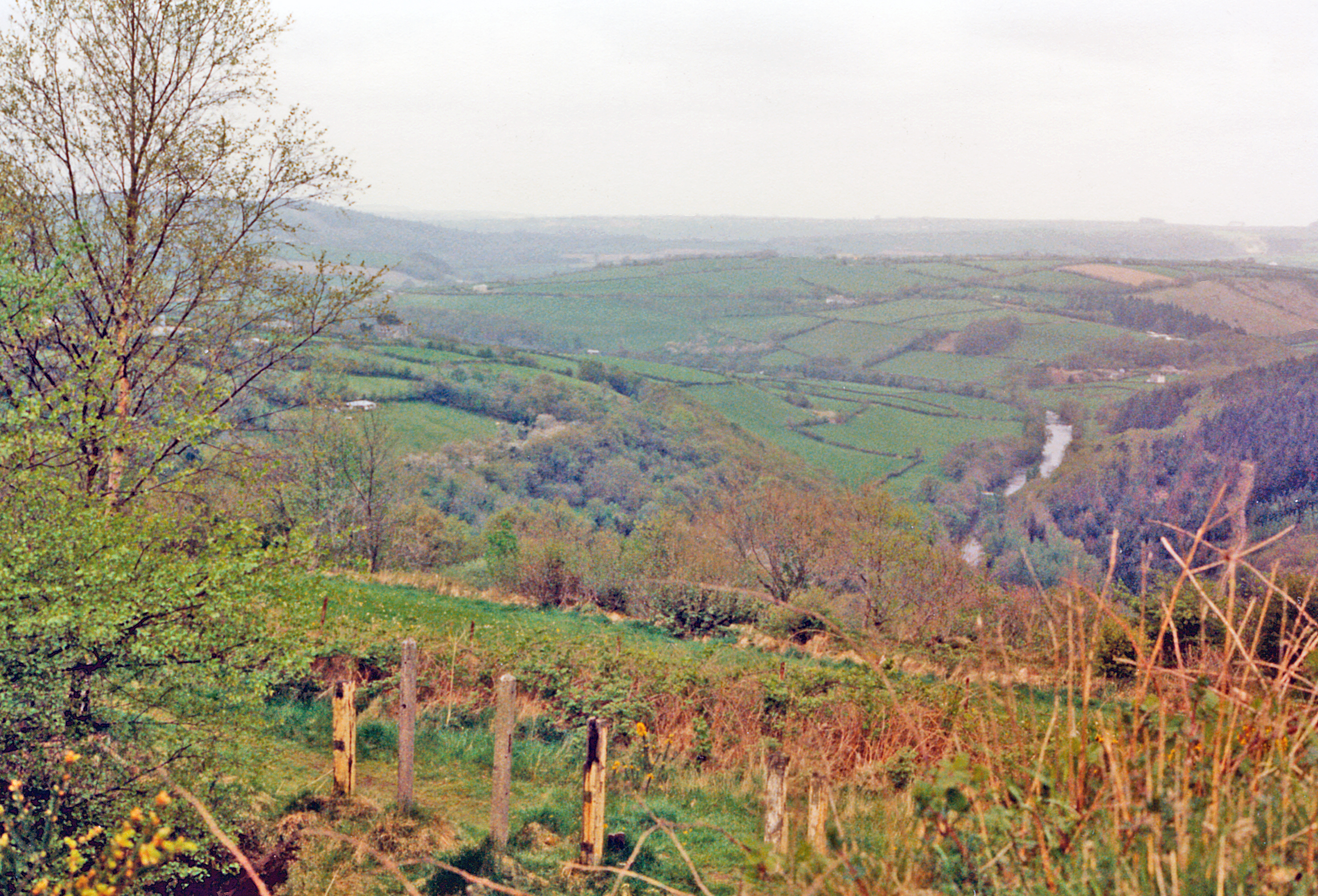
- Chilsworthy, looking over Tamar Valley towards Launceston

- Location within Cornwall
- OS grid reference: SX 4172
- Civil parish: Calstock
- Unitary authority: Cornwall
- Ceremonial county: Cornwall
- Region: South West
- Country: England
- Sovereign state: United Kingdom
- Post town: CALSTOCK
- Postcode district: PL18
- Police: Devon and Cornwall
- Fire: Cornwall
- Ambulance: South Western
- UK Parliament: South East Cornwall

Chilsworthy (Cornish: Karjyl) is a village in the civil parish of Calstock, in Cornwall, England. The village is 1-mile (1.6 km) west of Gunnislake, and used to have a railway station on the Callington Branch of the Plymouth, Devonport and South Western Junction Railway.

== History ==
Chilsworthy is a village located on the south bank of the River Tamar, and is part of the Parish of Calstock, in Cornwall, England. Historically it was a mining village in the Hundred of East Wivelshire. The name of the village derives from the Old English Ceol's Worthing, meaning Ceol's farm[stead], with Ceol being a personal name, a root it shares with the village of the same name, Chilsworthy, in Devon.

There is a pub in the village, the White Hart Inn, which featured in a BBC series called Saving Britain's Pubs. The village was served by a railway station on the Callington branch line between 1906 and 1966. Besides the passenger traffic, the railway had numerous freight sidings in the area including Chilsworthy Brick Kilns and Chimney which is now grade II listed.

Mining was undertaken in the area in the second-half of the 19th century, with tin and copper being produced at the Chilsworthy Mine (also known as the South Devon Mine even though it was in Cornwall). A tip from mining activity still exists in the area which contains traces of lead, arsenic, copper and tin.

== See also ==
- Chilsworthy, Devon
