= Latchley =

Village in Cornwall, England

Coordinates: 50.540°N 4.248°W

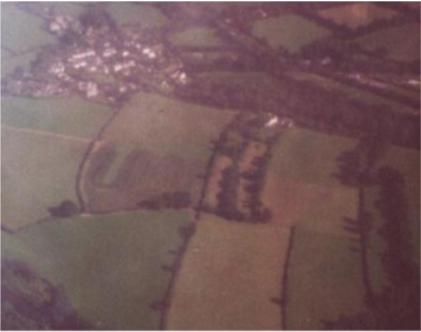
- Aerial view of Latchley village

- Location within Cornwall
- OS grid reference: SX408735
- Civil parish: Calstock
- Unitary authority: Cornwall
- Ceremonial county: Cornwall
- Region: South West
- Country: England
- Sovereign state: United Kingdom
- Post town: Gunnislake
- Postcode district: PL18

Latchley is a village in the Tamar Valley in Cornwall, England, UK. It is in the parish of Calstock (where the population of the 2011 census is included.).

== Latchley Church ==
In 1879, the "Foundation stone of our long wished for church was laid". Latchley Church was designed by Piers St Aubyn, the same architect as Gunnislake. It was built three years later than Gunnislake at a cost of £1,147 as a chapel-of-ease in the parish of Calstock dedicated to St Michael and All Angels. It was dedicated by the Bishop of Truro on 20 July 1883. After a bad attack of woodworm to the building in August 1968, it was closed to worshippers. In 1985, it was sold and used for a dwelling.
