= Tamara Coast to Coast Way =

87-mile footpath in Cornwall and Devon, England

The Tamara Coast to Coast Way is a 87-mile (140 km) walking route in England from Cremyll on the south coast of Cornwall to Morwenstow on its north coast. The route largely follows the River Tamar, which rises less than 4 miles (6.4 km) from the north coast, and is mostly in Cornwall with some sections in Devon. Tamara was the ancient goddess of the River Tamar.

By connecting with the South West Coast Path, the Tamara Way completes a 387-mile (623 km) circular walking route around the boundaries of Cornwall, known as Kylgh Kernow [The Circuit of Cornwall].

The route was officially opened in July 2023. It is waymarked with a logo showing a white bee on a green arrow on a blue roundel, with the name of the trail. It is marked and named on Ordnance Survey mapping.
