= Dimson =

Village in Cornwall, England

Coordinates: 50°31′26″N 4°13′23″W

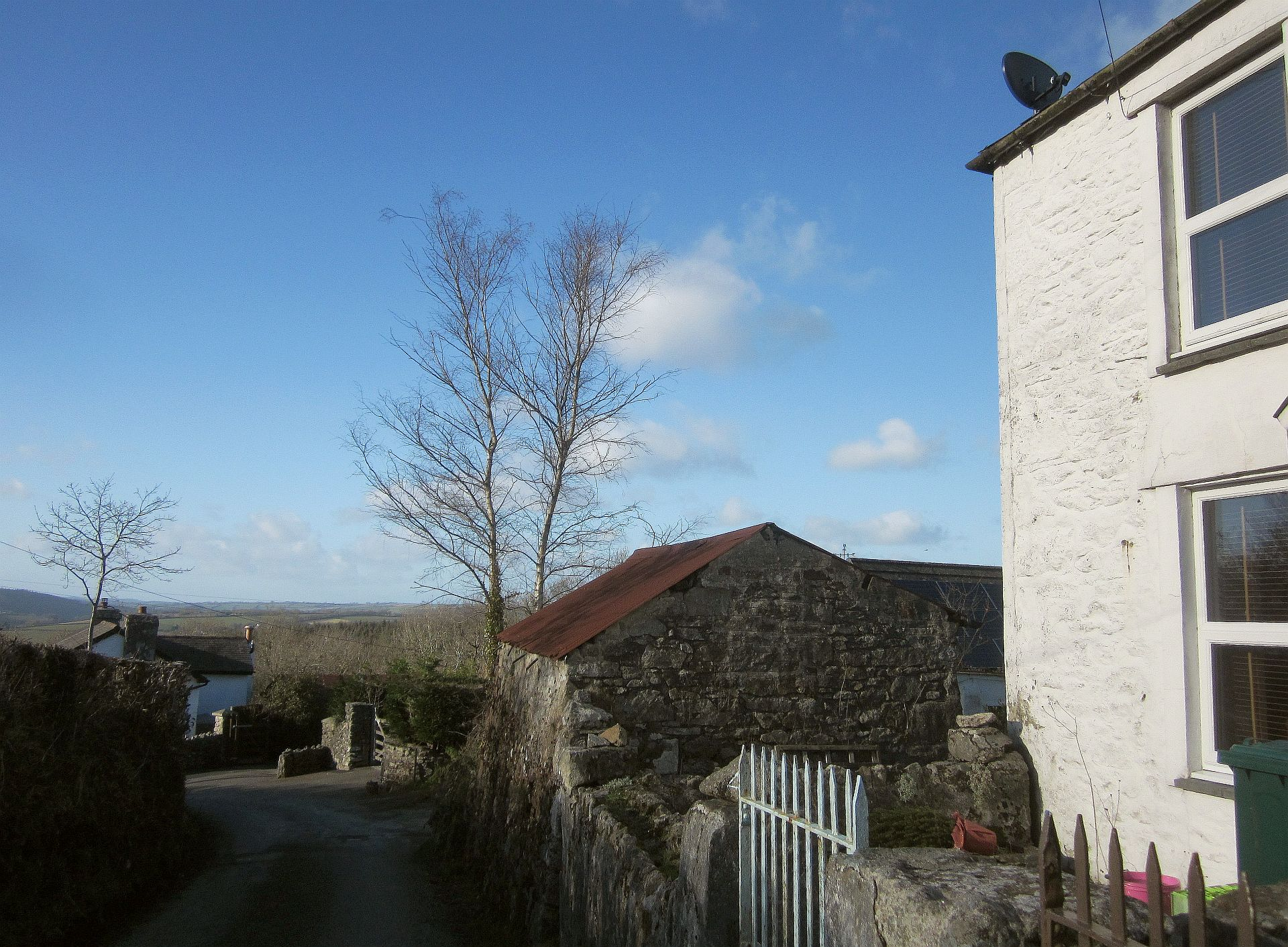
- Lane at North Dimson, Cornwall

- Location within Cornwall
- OS grid reference: SX425717
- Civil parish: Calstock
- Unitary authority: Cornwall
- Ceremonial county: Cornwall
- Region: South West
- Country: England
- Sovereign state: United Kingdom
- Post town: Gunnislake
- Postcode district: PL18 9
- Dialling code: 01822

Dimson is a small village in Cornwall, England. It is situated in the Tamar Valley approximately 10 1/2 miles (16.9 km) north of Plymouth and around two-thirds of a mile (1.1 km) north of Gunnislake. According to the Post Office, at the 2011 census population details were included in the civil parish of Calstock.
