= St Ann's Chapel, Cornwall =

Hamlet in Cornwall, England

Coordinates: 50°30′56″N 4°14′22″W

St Ann's Chapel is a village in the parish of Calstock, Cornwall, England, United Kingdom. It is west of Gunnislake on the A390 between Tavistock and Liskeard.

== Cornish wrestling ==
Cornish wrestling tournaments for prizes were held in the meadow adjacent to the Calstock Inn situated at St Ann's Chapel in the 1800s and 1900s.
