= Bohetherick =

Coordinates: 50.4854°N 4.2318°W

Bohetherick: Cornish: Boshydrek
- Location within Cornwall
- OS grid reference: SX4167
- Civil parish: St Dominic
- Shire county: Cornwall
- Region: South West
- Country: England
- Sovereign state: United Kingdom
- Post town: Saltash
- Postcode district: PL12
- Police: Devon and Cornwall
- Fire: Cornwall
- Ambulance: South Western

Bohetherick (Cornish: Boshydrek) is a village in the Tamar valley in east Cornwall, England, in the United Kingdom, approximately five miles (8 km) north of Saltash. It is in the civil parish of St Dominic.
