= Chilsworthy, Devon =

Village in south west England

Coordinates: 50°49′54″N 4°22′31″W

Chilsworthy
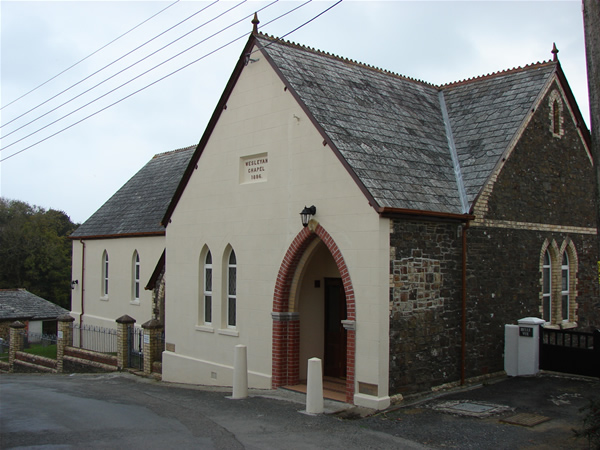
- Chilsworthy Chapel

- Location within Devon
- Civil parish: Holsworthy Hamlets
- District: Torridge
- Shire county: Devon
- Region: South West
- Country: England
- Sovereign state: United Kingdom
- Police: Devon and Cornwall
- Fire: Devon and Somerset
- Ambulance: South Western

Chilsworthy is a village in the civil parish of Holsworthy Hamlets, in the Torridge district, in the county of Devon, England. The village located about 3 km north west of Holsworthy, it is home to a late-19th century Methodist chapel.
