= Drakewalls =

Village in Cornwall, England

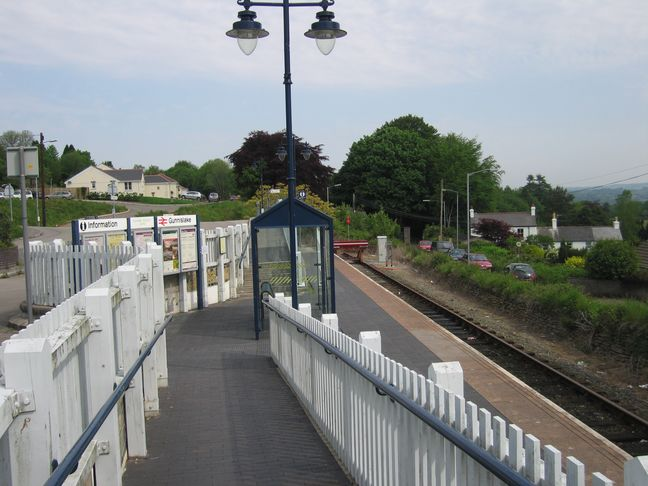
Gunnislake railway station is in Drakewalls

Drakewalls is a small village in southeast Cornwall, England, UK. It is in Calstock parish, adjacent to Gunnislake between Callington and Tavistock.

Primary education is provided by Delaware Community Primary School (formerly known as Delaware County Primary School) (at 50.515144°N 4.225962°W). It educates children from the ages of 4 to 11. The majority of pupils move onto Callington Community College after Year 6.

Gunnislake railway station on the Tamar Valley Line is located in the village.
