= Devonport High School for Girls =

Devonport High School For Girls

Location
- Lyndhurst Road; Peverell, Plymouth, Devon, PL2 3DL; England; 50.3927°N 4.1518°W

Information
- Type: Grammar School, Language academy
- Motto: Sine Labe Decus (Honour without Dishonour)
- Established: 1911
- Local authority: Plymouth City Council
- Department for Education URN: 136588 Tables
- Ofsted: Reports
- Head teacher: Lee Sargeant
- Gender: Girls
- Age: 11 to 18
- Enrolment: 826
- Website: www.devonportgirls.plymouth.sch.uk

Devonport High School for Girls is a selective girls' state grammar school with academy status (ages 11–18) in Plymouth, England.

== History ==
In September 1908 Devonport High School for Girls (DHSG) was recognised as a girls' secondary school. It was originally located at Paradise Road, Stoke in Plymouth, and known as Devonport Municipal Secondary School for Girls. It was established approximately 15 years after its sibling Devonport High School for Boys. The school moved to its current location which overlooks the Plymouth Argyle football ground, Home Park, on 10 September 1937. The school was divided into four houses- St. Joan, St. Margaret, St. Monica and St. Ursula, that were later changed to Falcon, Kestrel, Hawk and Eagle. The house system continues to exist but is now named Flete, Kitley, Hartland, Saltram and Edgcumbe after local houses.

During World War II the girls were evacuated to Tiverton Grammar School, whilst the DHSG building was initially used by the fire service who were drafted in from across England to fight fires created by the aerial bombardment. It was also used as a machine shop for the dockyard during this period. The building suffered bomb damage during the war. The tennis and netball courts added in 1952 can now be seen at a lower level than the playing field due to a crater left by an exploded mine.

Honour boards which hang at the back of the main hall were paid for by the money each of the pupils received to mark the Coronation of Queen Elizabeth II. In 1971 DHSG started to accept girls from all areas of Plymouth and by the 1980s girls were coming from outside Plymouth. In 2005 DHSG acquired Specialist Language College status bringing with it funding to provide better facilities, not just in building updating and expansion but in technology also. The new Learning Centre constructed in 2005 housed a modern library, new language laboratories and two fully equipped computer rooms.

== Academics ==
DHSG is a state school, catering to students at the top end of the academic ability range. These students are selected by means of the 11-plus entrance exam, which tests potential students' English comprehension and Mathematical skills.

DHSG is a specialist language school and in 2019 acquired Academy Trust Status.

As of September 2023 the school increased its PAN to 158 in year 7. The school has maintained its Specialist Language College status, and introduced Chinese into the curriculum in September 2006. Upon entering the school, students choose to study either French, German, Mandarin or Spanish. In Year 9 all students can choose a second language to study which includes Chinese, French, German, or Spanish. DHSG has achieved the full International School Award from the British Council in 2005, 2009, 2012 and 2015.

In the summer of 2013 the school achieved 100% five GCSE grades A*-C including English and Mathematics and the highest EBacc measure in the local area. The school has qualified for an Educational Outcomes Award by being in the top 20 per cent of schools nationally for progress made by pupils between their key stage 2 results and their GCSE results.

The school has continued to maintain high academic standards having achieved the highest Progress 8 and Attainment 8 score in the Greater Plymouth Area in 2017, 2018 and 2019.
