= Metherell, Cornwall =

Village in east Cornwall, England

Coordinates: 50.50417°N 4.24760°W

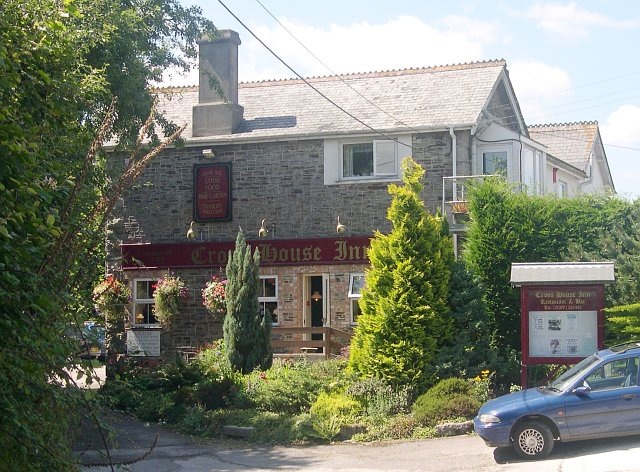
Cross House Inn, Metherell

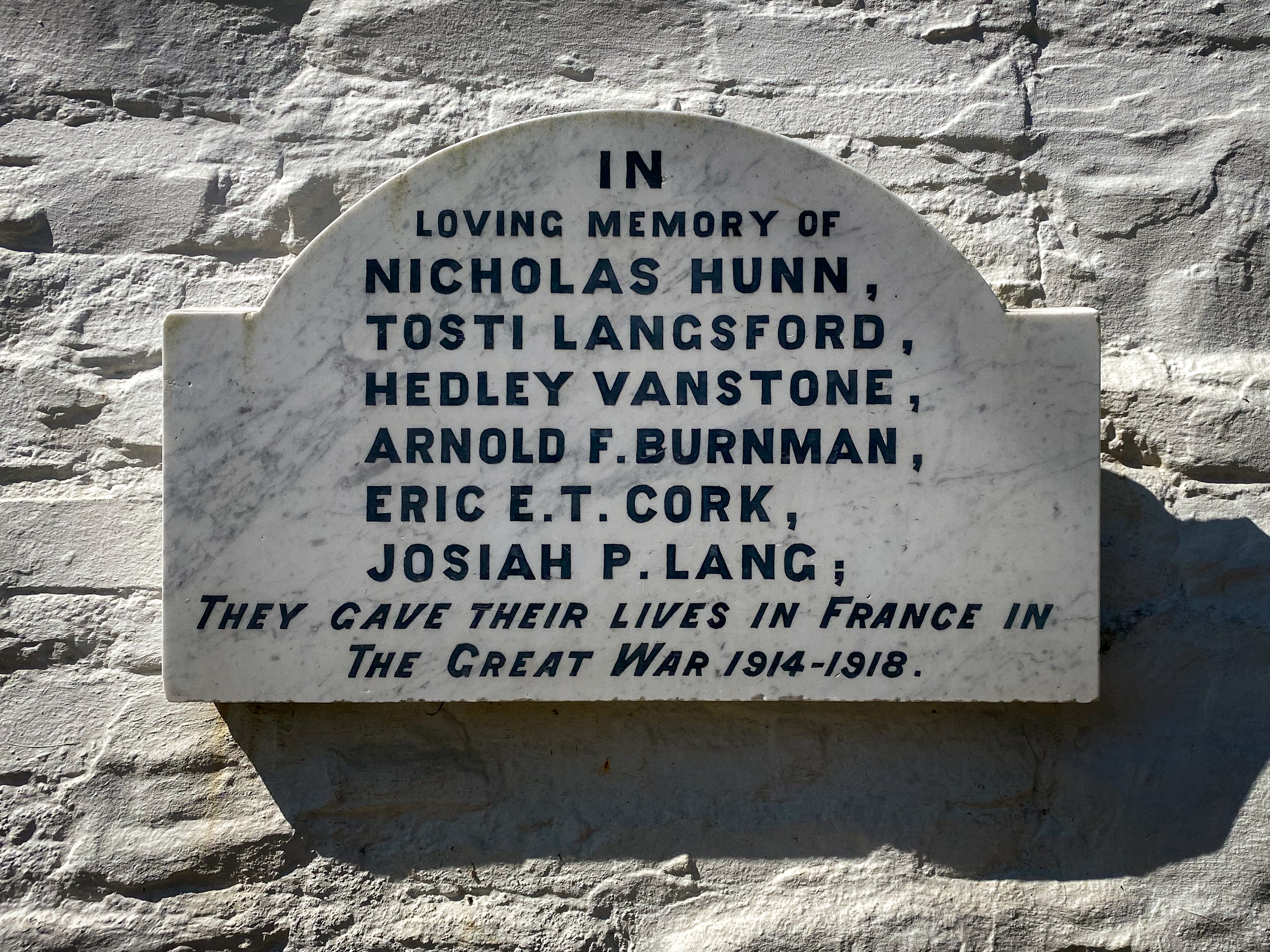
Lower Metherell World War I Memorial Tablet

Metherell is a village in east Cornwall, England, United Kingdom. It is situated three miles (5 km) east of Callington and two miles west of Calstock village in Calstock civil parish.
