= Harrowbarrow =

Village in Cornwall, England

Coordinates: 50.510°N 4.262°W

Harrowbarrow: Cornish: Kelliskovarnek
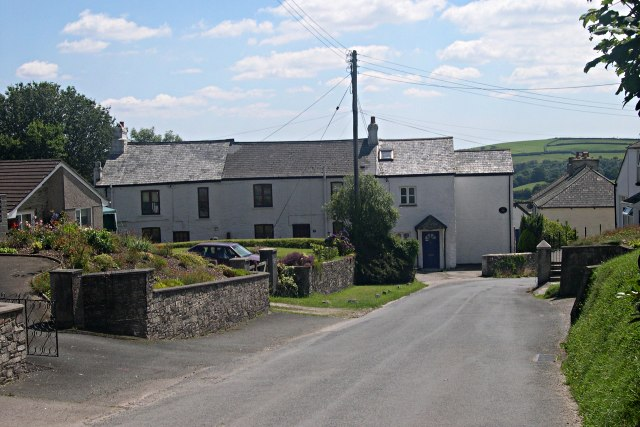
- Harrowbarrow

- Location within Cornwall
- OS grid reference: SX397702
- Civil parish: Calstock
- Unitary authority: Cornwall
- Ceremonial county: Cornwall
- Region: South West
- Country: England
- Sovereign state: United Kingdom
- Post town: Callington
- Postcode district: PLl7

Harrowbarrow (Cornish: Kelliskovarnek) is a village in the parish of Calstock in east Cornwall, England.

== All Saints, Harrowbarrow ==
In 1870 a parishioner presented the Rector with a piece of land, near the Prince of Wales Mine, and the church was designed by Mr J Piers St Aubyn and was built as a school and a mission chapel for £700. The church seats up to eighty worshippers.
