= Gunnislake =

Village in Cornwall, England

Coordinates: 50.5242°N 4.2133°W

Gunnislake: Cornish: Dowrgonna
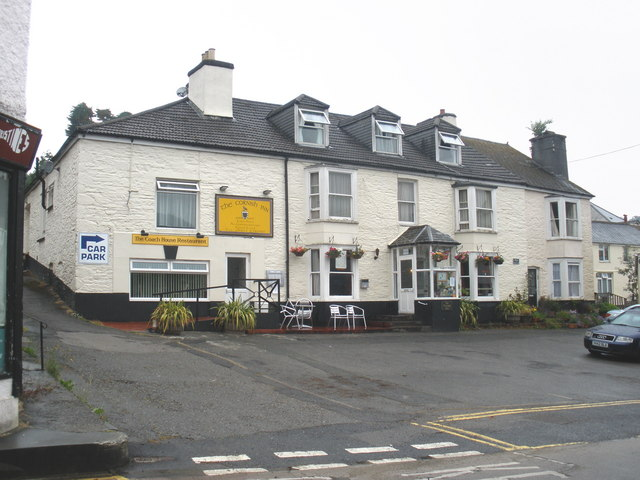
- The Cornish Inn

- Location within Cornwall
- OS grid reference: SX432717
- Civil parish: Calstock
- Shire county: Cornwall
- Region: South West
- Country: England
- Sovereign state: United Kingdom
- Post town: GUNNISLAKE
- Postcode district: PL18
- Dialling code: 01822
- Police: Devon and Cornwall
- Fire: Cornwall
- Ambulance: South Western
- UK Parliament: South East Cornwall

Gunnislake (Cornish: Dowrgonna) is a large village in east Cornwall, England, United Kingdom. It is situated in the Tamar Valley approximately ten miles (16 km) north of Plymouth The first woman cabinet minister in the British Empire, Mary Ellen Smith, was born here in 1863.

Gunnislake is in the civil parish of Calstock and is close to Cornwall's border with Devon which follows the course of the River Tamar. It has an electoral ward in its own name which includes much of Calstock and the surrounding area. The population at the 2011 census was 4,574. According to an OCSI report, of the total population, 562 (18.2%) are children, making up a larger proportion of the population than across Cornwall and Isles of Scilly (17.3%). 685 (22.2%) are people of pensionable age, making up a smaller proportion of the population than across Cornwall and Isles of Scilly (24.3%).

The village has a history of mining although this industry is no longer active in the area. During the mining boom in Victorian times more than 7000 people were employed in the mines of the Tamar Valley. During this period Gunnislake was held in equal standing amongst the richest mining areas in Europe.

== History ==
There has recently been discovered a significant Roman fort on the outskirts of Calstock, the largest known Roman site in Cornwall. Hingston Down is usually accepted as the place mentioned in an entry in the Anglo-Saxon Chronicle for 835 (corrected by scholars to 838) which says that Egbert king of the West Saxons defeated an alliance of Cornish Britons and Danish Vikings.

In 1644 the Battle of Gunnislake New Bridge was fought.

The famous painting by Turner Crossing the Brook exhibited in 1815 is in fact a view of Gunnislake Newbridge. Newbridge was built c. 1520: it is 182 feet long and has seven arches. It is built of large regular granite blocks and is considered by Sir Nikolaus Pevsner to be the best of the Cornish granite bridges.

Gunnislake's development was primarily due to the dramatic increase in mining and industrial activity in the nineteenth century. Mining provided around 7000 jobs at its peak in 1862. Most mining activity ceased in the late nineteenth century which has bequeathed interest for archaeologists and students of industrial heritage. As well as mining, other industry such as brickworks and quarries were present. Nearby, locations such as Kit Hill, Morwellham Quay, Cotehele and Calstock were mined and quarried and the Tamar was used for transporting the raw material obtained from the works. Arsenic was produced at Greenhill, Gunnislake until at least 1930.

A church dedicated to St. Anne was consecrated by Edward Benson, the Bishop of Truro in 1880.

== Geography ==
The area is mainly residential with a small handful of businesses ranging from pubs to garages and small shops. Gunnislake is located in the Tamar Valley designated Area of Outstanding Natural Beauty, though some recent industrial development has been attempted and achieved. Within early 2006 Hingston Down Quarry installed a new asphalt production tower which is easily noticeable as it is proud of the skyline of Gunnislake.

Since 2001, the village has annually hosted its own festival, encompassing a variety of events throughout a week-long celebration.

There is a King George's Field in memorial to King George V located in lower Gunnislake. It is also the home of Gunnislake Football Club.

== St. Annes, Gunnislake ==
The land was bought on 29 January 1879. The total cost of the building was £2,400 of which the Duke of Bedford gave £500 and the Church building society gave £200. The foundations stone of the church were laid by the Dowager Countess of Mount Edgcumbe, at 3pm on Tuesday, 30 September 1879. The building was designed by Mr J Piers St Aubyn and was consecrated by Edward Benson, the Bishop of Truro in 1880. It was dedicated to St. Anne because of an ancient local Holy Well, close by the site of the church. The Church seats up to 225 worshippers In 1918 Gunnislake appealed to become its own separate parish, but failed to raise the necessary funds.

== Sports and leisure ==
Gunnislake Football Club
- League: Duchy League
- Premier Division
Home colours	Away colours

=== Gunnislake Football Team ===
Gunnislake has a non-league football club, playing in the Duchy League, at the Premier Level of Cornish Football. Their home ground was at Gunnislake pitches, which is on the banks of the River Tamar, until the club moved to Butts Meadow near to Calstock. On the east boundary of pitch is the remains of the East Cornwall Mineral Railway.

=== Cornish wrestling ===
Cornish wrestling tournaments, for prizes, were held in Gunnislake, for example as part of the Gunnislake Fair and Cattle Show. Venues for matches included the Tavistock Inn.

W Littlejohn, originally from Gunnislake and weighing 220 lbs, known as 'tiny', was heavyweight champion of the Transvaal in 1910.

== Transport ==
Gunnislake railway station is the northern terminus of the Tamar Valley Line, which connects the villages of the Tamar valley with the city of Plymouth. (See also Plymouth, Devonport and South Western Junction Railway.) Gunnislake is now the terminus of the line but until 1966 it continued north to Callington. In 1994 the station was resited to remove a low road bridge.

Contentiously debated in the local press, the future of Gunnislake's rail-link with Plymouth has, in recent years, come under threat by the proposed re-establishment of a disused railway line between Tavistock and Plymouth.

== Gallery ==
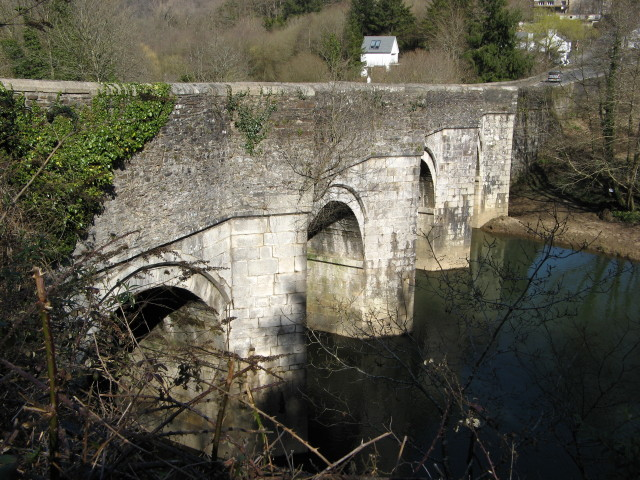
Newbridge

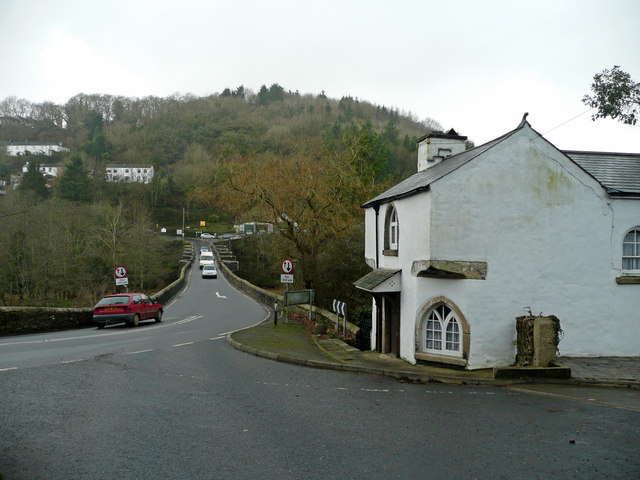
New Tamar Bridge and Toll House

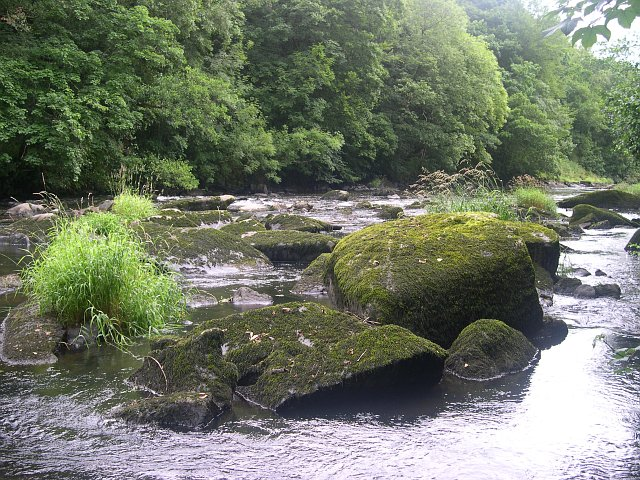
River Tamar

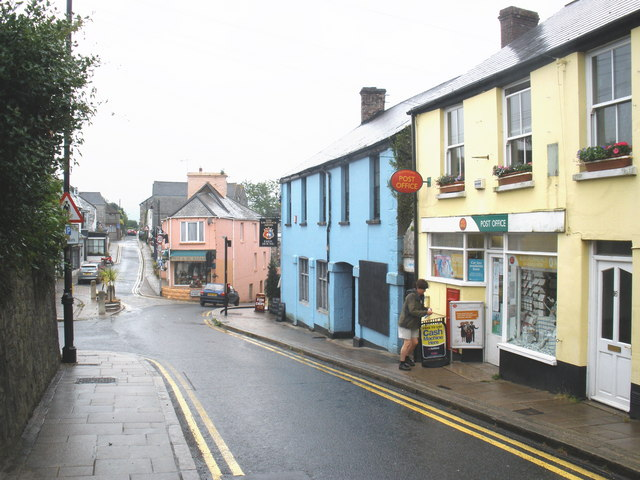
Fore Street

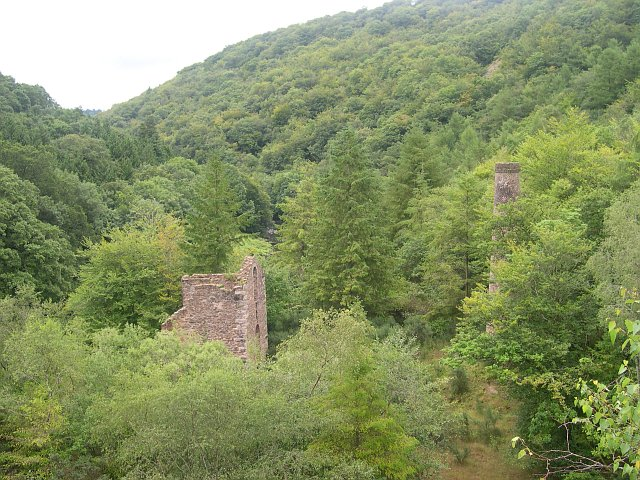
Gunnislake Clitters Engine House

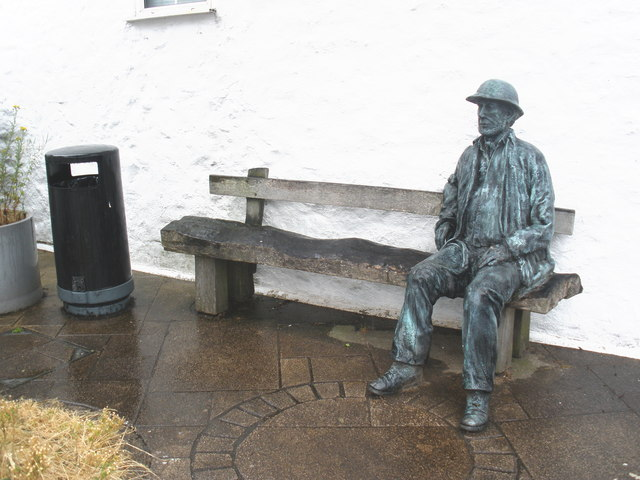
Sculpture of a typical Gunnislake miner

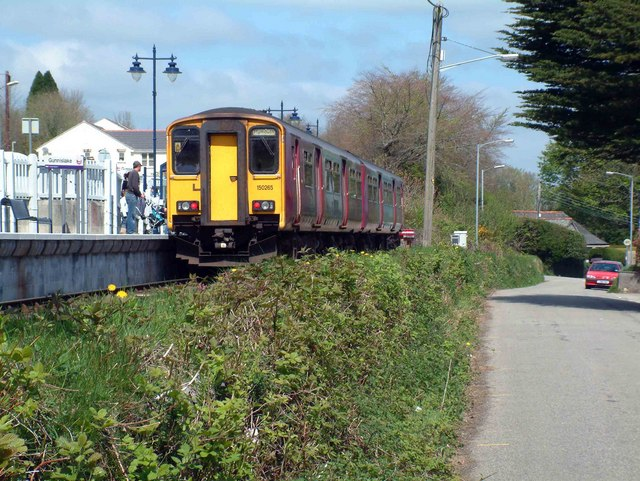
Gunnislake railway station
