= Lynher (electoral division) =

Electoral division of Cornwall in the UK

- ward Cornwall Council
- Boundary of Lynher in Cornwall from 2021.
- County: Cornwall

Current ward
- Created: 2021
- Councillor: Sharon Daw (Conservative)
- Number of councillors: One
- Created from: Lynher; Menheniot; St Dominick, Harrowbarrow and Kelly Bray; St Germans and Landulph

2013–2021
- Number of councillors: One
- Replaced by: Lynher
- Created from: St Ive

Lynher is an electoral division of Cornwall in the United Kingdom and returns one member to sit on Cornwall Council. The current Councillor is Sharon Daw, a Conservative.

== Councillors ==
=== 2013-2021 ===
Election	Member	Party
2013	Stephanie McWilliam	UKIP
2017	Sharon Daw	Conservative
2021	Seat abolished	

=== 2021-present ===
Election	Member	Party
2021	Sharon Daw	Conservative

== Extent ==
2013-2021 division boundaries shown within Cornwall

=== 2013-2021 ===
Between 2013 and 2021, Lynher represented the villages of Linkinhorne, Golberdon, St Ive, Pensilva, Minions, and Rilla Mill, and the hamlets of Mornick, Trewoodloe, Maders, Trevigro, St Ive Cross, Parkfield, Caradon Town, Downgate, Plushabridge, Rillaton, Upton Cross, North Darley, Darleyford, Henwood, Sharptor and South Hill. The village of Bray Shop was also partly covered by the division (being shared with the Stokeclimsland division). The division covered 6894 hectares.

=== 2021-present ===
Since 2021, Lynher has represented the villages of Linkinhorne, Golberdon, St Ive, Pensilva, Minions, Rilla Mill, Quethiock, Pillaton and St Mellion, and the hamlets of Mornick, Trewoodloe, Maders, Trevigro, St Ive Cross, Parkfield, Caradon Town, Downgate, Plushabridge, Rillaton, Upton Cross, North Darley, Darleyford, Henwood, Sharptor, South Hill, Trehunist and Blunts. The village of Bray Shop is also partly covered by the division (being shared with the Altarnun and Stoke Climsland division).

== Election results ==
=== 2021 election ===
2021 election: Lynher
Party	Candidate	Votes	%	±%
Conservative	Sharon Daw	929	46.0	
Liberal Democrats	Adam Sturtridge	645	32.0	
Green	Martin Corney	224	11.1	
Labour	Barry Adams	203	10.1	
Majority		284	14.1	
Rejected ballots		17	0.8	
Turnout		2018	43.0	
Registered electors		4695		
Conservative win (new seat)				

=== 2017 election ===
2017 election: Lynher
Party	Candidate	Votes	%	±%
Conservative	Sharon Daw	614	38.7	
UKIP	Stephanie McWilliam	361	22.7	
Labour	Ruth Wilson	233	14.7	
Liberal Democrats	Christine Hordley	224	14.1	
Green	Martin Corney	142	8.9	
Majority		253	15.9	
Rejected ballots		13	0.8	
Turnout		1587	45.0	
Conservative gain from UKIP		Swing		

=== 2013 election ===
2013 election: Lynher
Party	Candidate	Votes	%	±%
UKIP	Stephanie McWilliam	469	34.8	
Conservative	Finbar Heely	391	29.0	
Liberal Democrats	Christine Hordley	388	28.8	
Independent	Alan Neal	91	6.8	
Majority		78	5.8	
Rejected ballots		8	0.6	
Turnout		1347	38.1	
UKIP win (new seat)				
