= Darley =

Darley or Darly may refer to:

== Places ==
=== Australia ===
- Darley, Victoria, a suburb of Bacchus Marsh, Victoria

=== England ===
- Darley Abbey, a village in Derbyshire
- Darley Bridge, a bridge in Derbyshire
- Darley Dale, a town in Derbyshire (Darley Bridge is a suburb)
- Darley Moor Airfield, a motor racing circuit on a former RAF airfield in Derbyshire
- Darley, North Yorkshire, a village in Nidderdale, North Yorkshire, England (includes Darley Head)
- Darleyford, Cornwall, also known as Darley
- North Darley, Cornwall
- South Darley, Derbyshire

== People ==
- Darley (surname)
- Lise Darly
- Matthias Darly
- Darley George Boucicault, apparently an alias of Dion Boucicault
- Francesca Maria Steele (1848–1931), an English writer who used the pseudonym Darley Dale for her fiction.
- Darlie Routier, a woman on Texas death row
- Darley, goalkeeper for Feyenoord

== Other ==
- the Darley Arabian, a horse named after Thomas Darley
- Darley Oaks Farm, a farm involved in animal rights campaigning
- Darley House, a historic house in Clayton, Delaware, USA
- Darley Stud, the global breeding operation owned by Sheikh Mohammed bin Rashid Al Maktoum
- Darley Racing, Thoroughbred horse racing stable
  - sponsors of the Darley Alcibiades Stakes, a horse race
- Darlie, a brand of toothpaste
