= Stara Woods =

Private woodland in Cornwall, England

Coordinates: 50.54196°N 4.41524°W

Stara Woods is a privately owned woodland in East Cornwall, England, UK, of local interest after being bought by a local resident in 2004 and repurposed as a community woodland. The woods are in the Lynher Valley and south-southeast of North Hill.

== Location and natural features ==
Stara Woods is a woodland of circa 19 hectares (47 acres) located 0.45 miles (0.72 km) west of Rillaton and south of Bathpool in east Cornwall. The name derives from Stara Bridge, a medieval clapper bridge located at the south of the woods. It is made up of three discrete woods: Colquite Wood and Treovis Wood, deciduous woodlands dating back at least to the 17th century; and Broad Wood, a conifer plantation dating to the 1980s, and in process of being replanted with oak, beech and hazel.

Treovis and Broad Woods lie on the southern and western oxbow valley of the River Lynher, facing north and east, whilst Colquite Wood is to the east of the river facing west and south; all at elevations from 82 metres (269 ft) to circa 130 metres (430 ft) above sea level. A tributary of the Lynher, Shales Brook, forms the northern boundary of Treovis Wood, and a leat which once supplied mills at Rilla Mill runs through all three woods. A 2013 suspension bridge crosses the Lynher linking Colquite and Broad Woods.

Fauna in the woods include otters, brown long-eared bats and dormice.

== History ==
The Friends of Stara Wood assert that the woodlands can be traced back to Manor of Carneddon, owned by Edward, the Black Prince in the 14th century.

More recently, the woods were part of the Duchy of Cornwall estate of Botternell, until bought in 2004 by Anne Hughes, a local resident who remortgaged her house to cover the costs. Hughes has opened up permissive footpaths through the wood, and is working with volunteers to effect ecological and sustainable management of Stara Woods to provide an arts, environmental, educational and recreational resource for the area, whilst preserving its essential beauty and tranquillity.
