= Stara Bridge =

Road bridge in Cornwall, England

Coordinates: 50.53905°N 4.41526°W

Stara Bridge is a clapper bridge across the River Lynher in east Cornwall, England, dating to the Late Middle Ages and now scheduled under the Ancient Monuments and Archaeological Areas Act 1979 as a rare surviving example of such bridge types. The surrounding area is known as Starabridge.

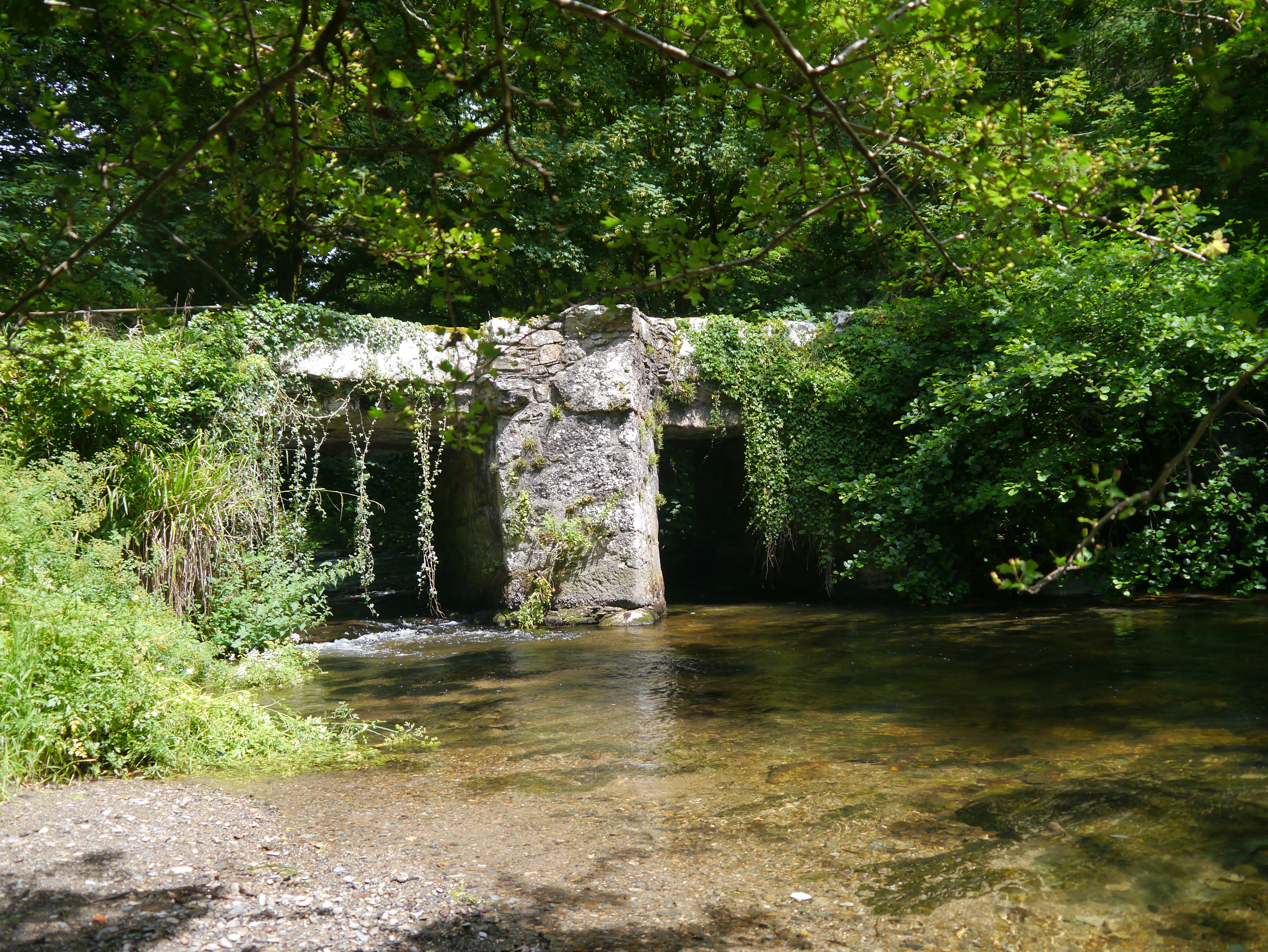
Stara Bridge with The River Lynher flowing beneath it, taken in 2020

== Location and structure ==
Stara Bridge is located 0.43 miles (0.69 km) west of the hamlet of Rillaton, in the parish of Linkinhorne in east Cornwall, 6.8 miles (10.9 km) east of the Devon border, and on the southern perimeter of Stara Woods. The east–west three-span bridge, part of a minor road, carries road traffic across the River Lynher.

The bridge retains much of its original form and structure. It comprises three spans made of massive granite slabs termed 'clappers', supported at each end by the bridge abutments and above the river by two piers, with causeways linking the road to the bridge at either end. The western pier is 2 metres (6 ft 7 in) to 2.1 metres (6 ft 11 in) in width, whilst the eastern pier is 2.7 metres (8 ft 10 in) to 2.85 metres (9 ft 4 in) wide. Both have pointed cutwaters, much eroded on the east pier downstream, and are faced with large granite blocks, rough and weathered on the west pier, dressed and squared on the east pier. The three openings beneath the bridge vary from 2.3 metres (7 ft 7 in) to 2.45 metres (8 ft 0 in) wide and are roughly square in section. The abutments and causeways have masonry walls of roughly dressed granite and rubble. The bridge has a contemporary mettled road surface, between low parapets of granite block construction.

The bridge, between abutments, is 12 metres (39 ft) in length, and together with the 11.6 metres (38 ft) western causeway and the 8 metres (26 ft) length eastern causeway spans 31.6 metres (104 ft). At its centre the roadway is 2.8 metres (9 ft 2 in) in width between parapets, and at the east end of the parapets, 3.8 metres (12 ft) wide. The eastern causeway incorporates an 18th-century flood-water tunnel 13.5 metres (44 ft) long, 0.95 metres (3 ft 1 in) wide and 1.2 metres (3 ft 11 in) high, with a granite slab roof and rubble masonry walls, draining a small floodplain situated to the north of the causeway.

== History ==
The date of construction of the bridge is uncertain; Historic England suggest the late Middle Ages, a span of 200 years from 1301 to 1500. Stara Bridge was one of two clapper bridges serving the Manor of Rillaton, the head manor of the Rillaton Hundred, one of the Hundreds of Cornwall noted in the Domesday Book. The second bridge, possibly dating to 1155 or before, was downstream at Rilla Mill, but was demolished in the 1890s. Historic England argues that Stara Bridge must have been constructed at a time when Rillaton - now a hamlet of few houses - was still sufficiently locally important and wealthy enough to afford its construction; and the decline in the manorial system at the end of the Middle Ages points to a date prior to 1500.

Historic England note also that the bridge stands as testament to the survival of medieval road patterns in the landscape, despite the utility of the bridge being greatly diminished by the bridge at Rilla Mill which forms the contemporary east–west route in the locality.
