= Lynher =

Lynher may refer to:

- River Lynher in Cornwall
- Lynher (electoral division), an electoral division of Cornwall
- Lynher, Tamar Barge
- Lynher, one of the Torpoint Ferries
