= Bathpool =

Bathpool may refer to two places in the United Kingdom:

- Bathpool, Cornwall, a village
- Bathpool, Somerset, a hamlet

== See also ==
- Bathpool Park
