= Rilla =

Rilla may refer to:

- Rilla Askew (born 1951), American writer
- Walter Rilla (1894–1980), German actor
- Wolf Rilla (1920–2005), German film director

== See also ==
- Rilla of Ingleside, a 1921 novel in the Anne of Green Gables series
- Rilla Mill, a village in Cornwall, England
