= Pensilva =

Village in east Cornwall, England

Coordinates: 50°30′11″N 4°24′40″W

Pensilva: Cornish: Pennsilva
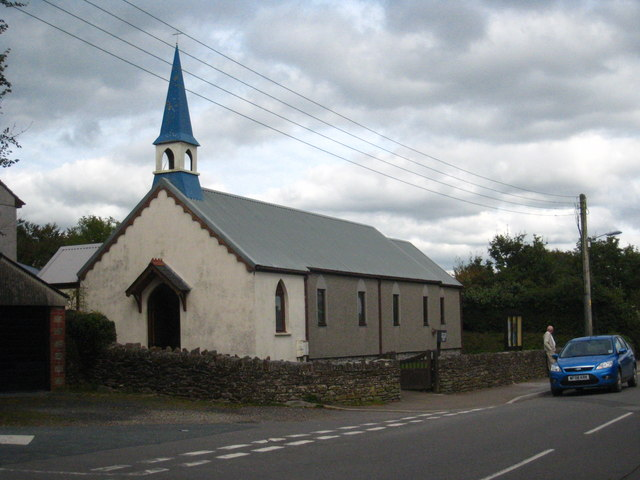
- St John's chapel-of-ease

- Location within Cornwall
- OS grid reference: SW291697
- Civil parish: St Cleer
- Unitary authority: Cornwall
- Ceremonial county: Cornwall
- Region: South West
- Country: England
- Sovereign state: United Kingdom

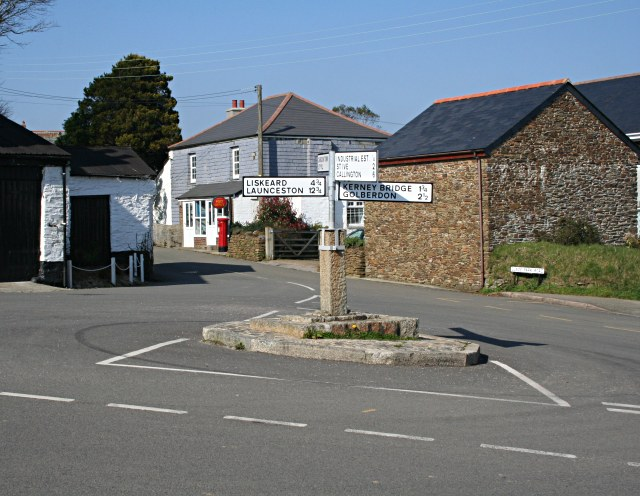
Crossroads in Pensilva village

Pensilva (Cornish: Pennsilva) is a village in the civil parish of St Ive and Pensilva, in east Cornwall, England, United Kingdom. It is at OS grid ref SX291697 about four miles (6 km) northeast of Liskeard. Nearby settlements include Charaton Cross and Middlehill.

The original small settlement grew quickly during the nineteenth century in response to industrial activity on the moorland north and west of the village. There is a Church of England chapel of St John (a chapel-of-ease to St Ive).

The village centre is about a mile from the edge of Bodmin Moor. At Caradon Hill, there is a large mast for the transmission for TV signals to the area. Caradon Hill is heavy with ancient mineshafts and engine houses dating from the 1900s. The hill was once famous for its copper mines but these are now closed. The South Caradon Copper Mine, 1 km to the south-west of the transmitter, was the biggest copper mine in the UK in the second half of the 19th century. From the top of the hill, you can see Plymouth and the Tamar estuary.

Pensilva is not generally considered a destination for tourists although nearby Minions has better-known historical attractions in the form of the Cheesewring—a natural granite tor at the edge of a disused quarry—and The Hurlers, three stone circles.

The local pub in Minions—The Cheesewring—burnt down on Christmas Eve 2021. Other nearby pubs are The Wheal Tor, and The Crows Nest in Darite. As of 26 December 2022, the Victoria Inn, the village pub, closed permanently. There is one general-grocery shop in the middle of the village.

The Millennium House in Pensilva is a community owned social centre built in 1999. Over the years it has waxed and waned in popularity and the incumbent small bar has changed from a club to a pub in that time. It is the location of the part-time Post Office and a volunteer-run café is open during PO hours.
