= Trewoodloe =

Trewoodloe is a hamlet near Golberdon in the parish of South Hill, Cornwall, England, United Kingdom.
