= St Ive and Pensilva =

Civil parish in Cornwall, England

Coordinates: 50.480°N 4.382°W

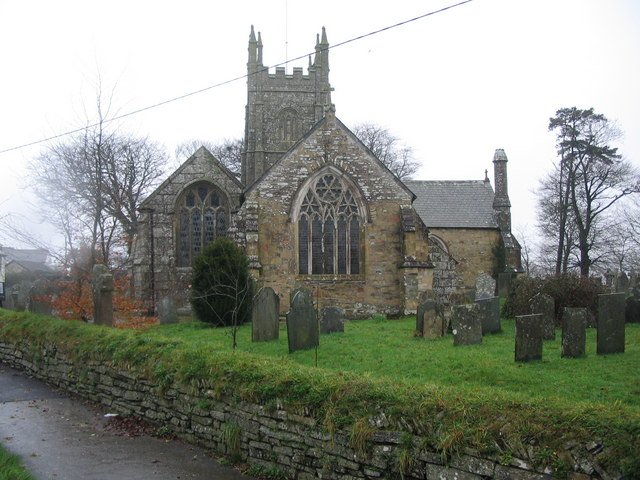
- The parish church in St Ive

- Location within Cornwall
- Population: 2,300 (United Kingdom Census 2011)
- OS grid reference: SX311672
- Civil parish: St Ive and Pensilva
- Unitary authority: Cornwall
- Ceremonial county: Cornwall
- Region: South West
- Country: England
- Sovereign state: United Kingdom
- Postcode district: PL14
- Dialling code: 01579
- Police: Devon and Cornwall
- Fire: Cornwall
- Ambulance: South Western

St Ive and Pensilva, formerly St Ive is a civil parish in Cornwall, England, United Kingdom. The parish has 4,246 residents and an area of 6,894 acres.

The parish is centred on the village of St Ive and also contains Gang, Middlehill, Parkfield, Pensilva, St Ive Cross and Woolston.

== History ==
The parish was renamed from "St Ive" to "St Ive and Pensilva" on 1 April 2021.
