= Downgate, Cornwall =

Hamlet in England

Coordinates: 50.513°N 4.427°W

Downgate: Cornish: Porth an Woon
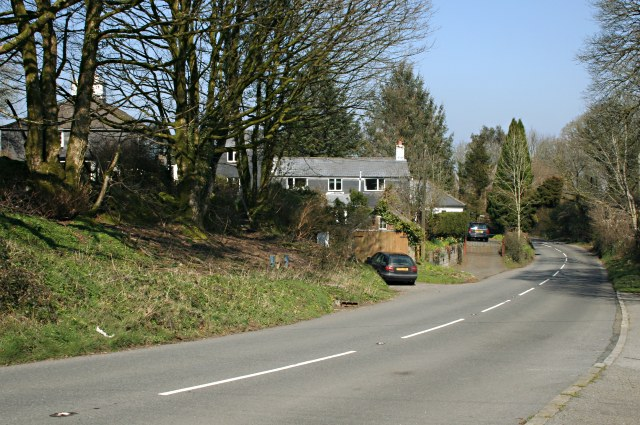
- Downgate

- Location within Cornwall
- OS grid reference: SX280710
- Civil parish: Linkinhorne
- Unitary authority: Cornwall
- Ceremonial county: Cornwall
- Region: South West
- Country: England
- Sovereign state: United Kingdom
- Post town: Liskeard
- Postcode district: PL14 5

Downgate (Cornish: Porth an Woon, meaning gate of the moor) is a hamlet in east Cornwall, England. It is between Pensilva and Upton Cross. According to the Post Office the 2011 census population was included in the civil parish of Linkinhorne.
