= Upton Cross =

Hamlet in Cornwall, England

Coordinates: 50.526°N 4.429°W

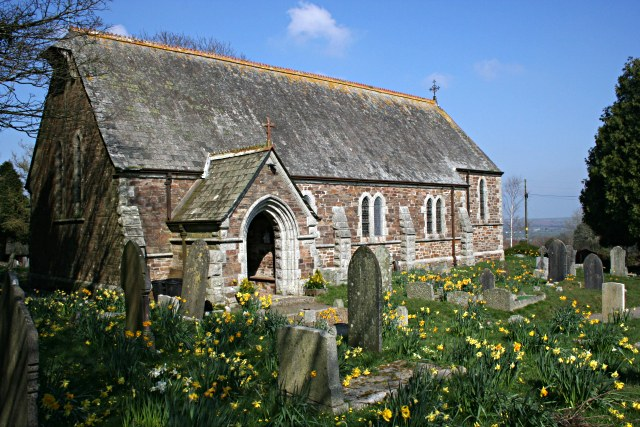
St Paul's Church, Upton Cross

Upton Cross (Cornish: Krows Trewartha) and Upton are hamlets a quarter of a mile apart in east Cornwall, England, United Kingdom. Upton is situated at grid reference SX 279 724 north of Upton Cross 5 miles (8 kilometres) northwest of Callington. They are on the northeast side of Caradon Hill on the B3254 Liskeard to Launceston road. St Paul's Church at Upton Cross is a mission church built in this corner of the parish of Linkinhorne in 1887 to serve the needs of the local mining community.

The area is served by Upton Cross Academy, a primary school and pre-school. The school is part of Kernow Learning, a multi-academy trust of schools in Cornwall.

A little further north are the hamlets of Darleyford and North Darley below Notter Tor and a remarkable tree, the Darley Oak.

At Netherton Farm Yarg cheese was produced from 1984 to 2006 by Lynher Dairies. Cornish Blue, a cheese made by the Cornish Cheese Company at Upton Cross, was the winning cheese in the World Food Awards in December 2010.

The Hurlers are a group of three stone circles approximately 2 miles to the west, near the neighbouring village of Minions.
