= Notter, Cornwall =

Hamlet in Cornwall, England

Coordinates: 50.424°N 4.274°W

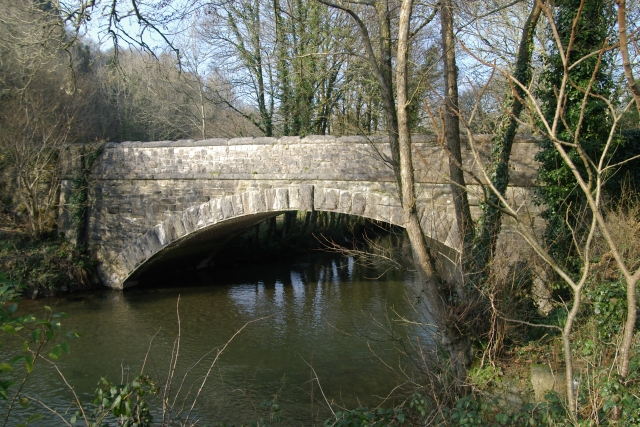
The River Lynher at Notter Bridge

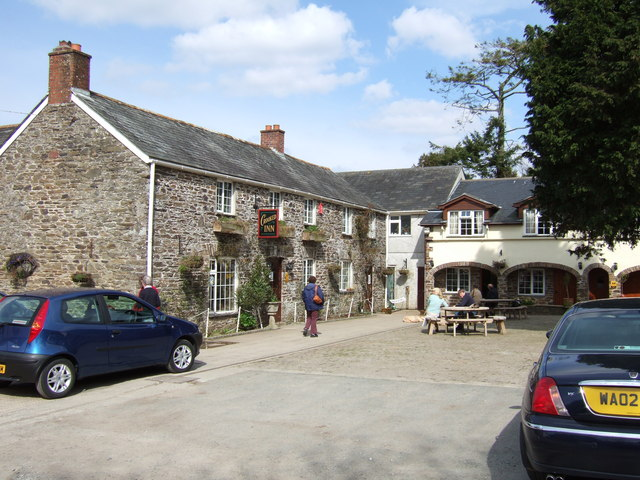
The Crooked Inn, Stoketon

Notter and Notter Bridge are adjoining hamlets in southeast Cornwall, England, United Kingdom. They are situated in the civil parish of St Stephens-by-Saltash approximately three miles (5 km) northwest of Saltash. The A38 trunk road crosses the River Lynher at Notter Bridge.

== History ==
Stoketon House was built in about 1770, and was the seat of Admiral De Courcy. By the 1860s it was in the possession of the Edwards family.

Stoketon Cross along the A38 road has been the scene of numerous automobile accidents. In November 2017 a collision between two cars and a motorcycle occurred here. In 2014 it was announced that £4.5m in private sector funding had been raised for an improvement at the junction.

== Landmarks ==
The public houses in the area are the Notter Bridge Riverside Inn and The Crooked Inn. A local cider maker, Kerensa Aval, which means "Apple friendship” in Cornish, is situated at Broadwater Farm. Crylla Valley Cottages and Notter Bridge Caravan Park cater for tourists.
