= Mornick =

Hamlet in Cornwall, England

Coordinates: 50°31′41″N 4°22′08″W

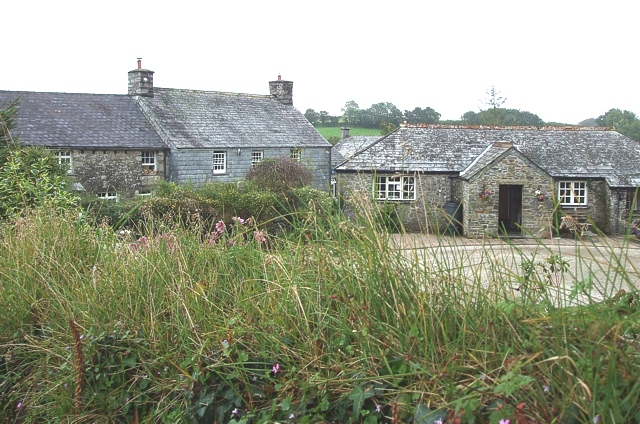
Mornick

Mornick is a hamlet in the parish of South Hill, Cornwall, England.
