= Theophilus Wodenote =

Church of England clergyman

The Reverend Samuel Woodford
- Vicar of Linkinhorne
- Province: Canterbury
- Diocese: Exeter
- Appointed: 1619

Personal details
- Baptised: 1588
- Died: 1662
- Denomination: Anglican
- Spouse: Mary Spicer (m. 1615)
- Children: Theophilus Wodenote
- Education: King's College, Cambridge

Theophilus Wodenote (bapt. 1588 – 1662) was a Church of England clergyman and Royalist divine.

== Life ==
Theophilus Wodenote, born at Linkinhorne, near Launceston, Cornwall, was son of Thomas Wodenote, MA, fellow of King's College, Cambridge, and vicar of that parish, who was descended from the Wodenoths or Woodnoths of Cheshire. His mother was Francisca, daughter of Henry Clifford of Boscombe, Wiltshire. He was educated at Eton school, and was elected in 1606 to King's College, Cambridge, where he obtained a fellowship. He proceeded MA in due course, and was incorporated in that degree at Oxford on 13 July 1619. He graduated BD at Cambridge in 1623, and was created D.D. in 1630. He was vicar of Linkinhorne from 1619 to 1651, when he was sequestered from his benefice on account of his adherence to the Royalist cause. He was restored to his vicarage in 1660, and was buried at Linkinhorne on 1 October 1662.

He married at Linkinhorne, in 1615, Mary, daughter of James Spicer of St. Gorran, "who came out of the East Countrey". His son Theophilus (born 1625) was matriculated at Exeter College, Oxford, in 1652, and, like his father, furnished John Aubrey with notes for his Brief Lives.

== Works ==
His principal works were:

1. Hermes Theologus: or a Divine Mercurie dispatcht with a grave Message of New Descants upon Old Records, London, 1649, 12mo, edited with a preface by the Rev. Edward Simmons. There is a portrait of Wodenote in the engraved title-page.
2. Good Thoughts in Bad Times, London, c. 1652. Wood says this manual was written at Broad Chalk, Wiltshire, while the author "absconded in the house of a near relation of his (vicar of that place), being then obnoxious to arrests".
3. Eremicus Theologus; or a Sequestred Divine his Aphorisms or Breviats of Speculations, London, 1654, 8vo.

== Bibliography ==
- Cooper, Thompson (1900). "Wodenote, Theophilus" . In Lee, Sidney (ed.). Dictionary of National Biography. Vol. 62. London: Smith, Elder & Co. pp. 277–278.
- "Theophilus Wodenote", National Portrait Gallery. Accessed 26 February 2022.
