= Rillaton =

Hamlet in Cornwall, England

Coordinates: 50.53870°N 4.40227°W

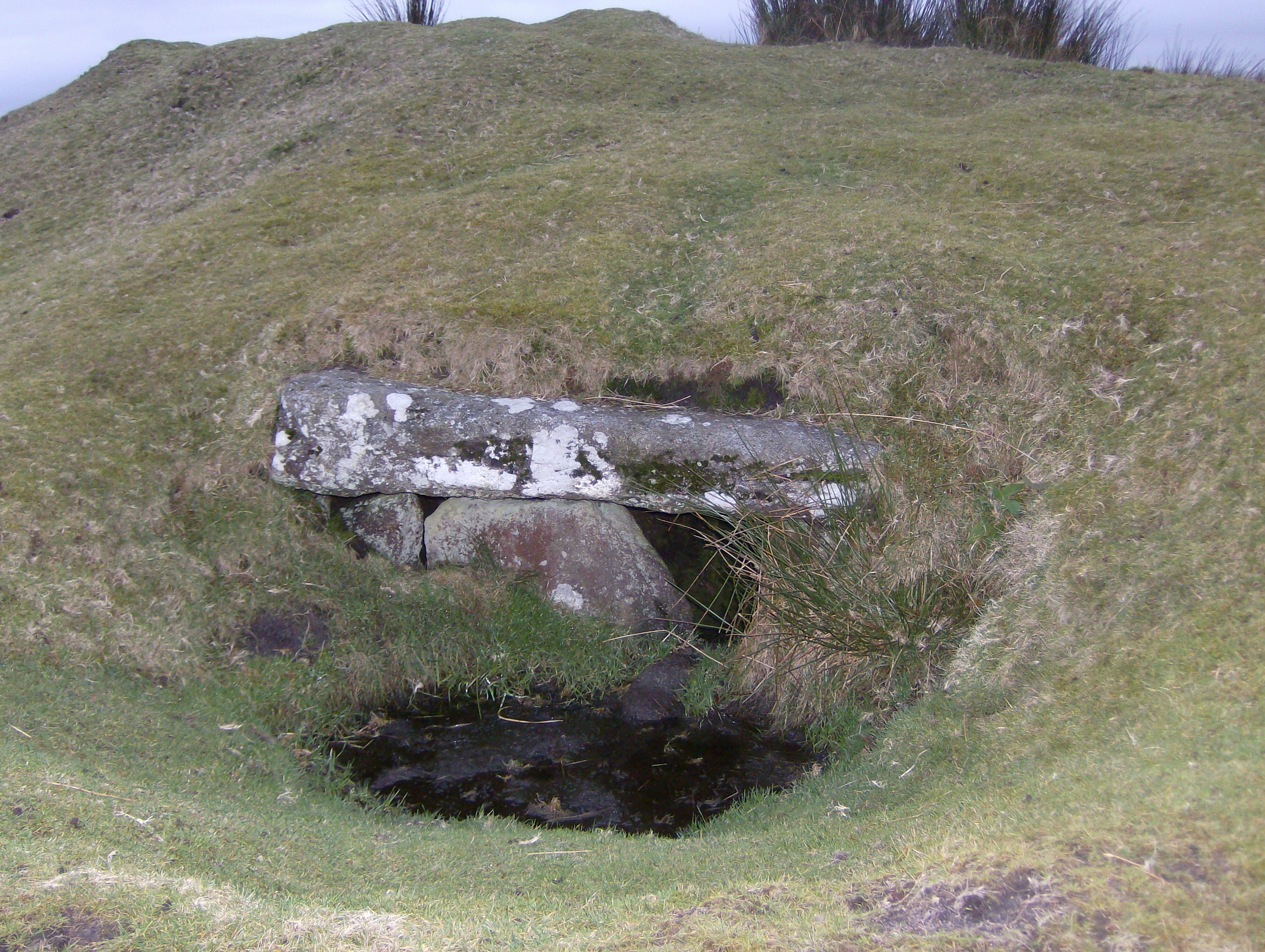
Rillaton Barrow

Rillaton (Cornish: Reslegh) is a hamlet in the parish of Linkinhorne in Cornwall, England. Nearby is the Bronze Age round barrow where the Rillaton Gold Cup was found in 1837.

Rillaton was the head manor of the hundred of East Wivelshire and one of the Antiqua maneria, the original 17 manors belonging to the Earldom of Cornwall. Stara Bridge, a surviving clapper bridge, provides evidence of the economic importance of Rillaton in the Late Middle Ages.

== See also ==
- Stara Woods
