= Darly =

Darly is a surname. Notable people with the surname include:

- Hélène Darly (1900–1994), French actress
- Lise Darly (born 1981), French singer
- Mary Darly (fl. 1756–1779) and Matthew Darly (fl. 1741–1778), English printsellers and caricaturists

== See also ==
- Darley (surname)
