= Bathpool, Cornwall =

Village in Cornwall, England

Coordinates: 50.5472°N 4.4225°W

Bathpool: Cornish: Pollbath
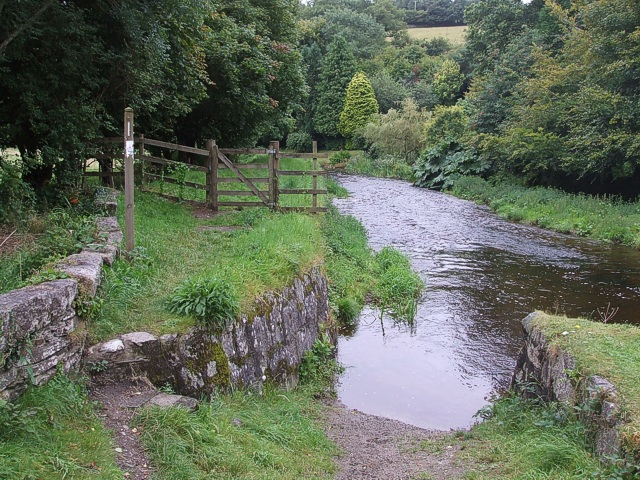
- The River Lynher at Bathpool

- Location within Cornwall
- OS grid reference: SX284748
- Civil parish: North Hill
- Unitary authority: Cornwall
- Ceremonial county: Cornwall
- Region: South West
- Country: England
- Sovereign state: United Kingdom
- Post town: LAUNCESTON
- Postcode district: PL15
- Dialling code: 01579
- Police: Devon and Cornwall
- Fire: Cornwall
- Ambulance: South Western
- UK Parliament: North Cornwall

Bathpool (Cornish: Pollbath) is a small village in the civil parish of North Hill in east Cornwall, England, United Kingdom. It is situated in the River Lynher valley on the southeast fringe of Bodmin Moor, about five miles (8 kilometres) northwest of Callington.

== See also ==
- Stara Woods
