= Darley Oak =

Ancient tree in Cornwall, England

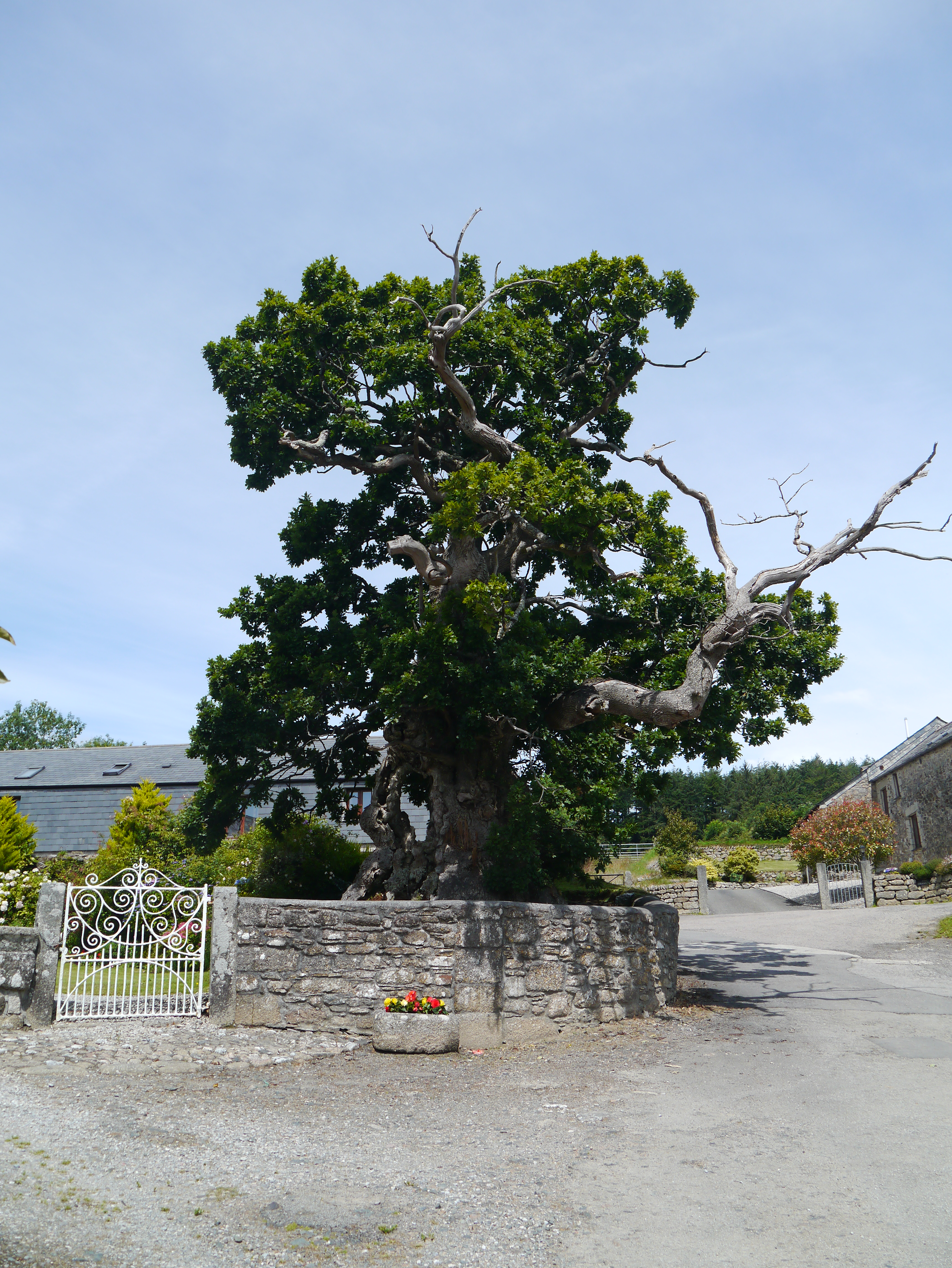
- Image showing the Darley Oak, taken in 2020
- Interactive map of Darley Oak
- Species: English oak (Quercus robur)
- Location: Darleyford, near Linkinhorne, Cornwall, Great Britain
- Coordinates: 50°32′02″N 4°26′02″W
- Date seeded: Original - pre-1030 AD
- Custodian: Private ownership

The Darley Oak is a pedunculate oak tree (Quercus robur) which grows near Darleyford in the parish of Linkinhorne on the edge of Bodmin Moor, Cornwall, England, UK. This ancient tree is thought to be at least 1,000 years old, and a considerable number of legends take it as their core. Folk tradition attributes healing properties to the tree, and it is said that any wish made to it will eventually come true. Its acorns are also used as amulets, and were once used by pregnant women during pregnancy, to bring them luck. It was chosen one of the 50 Great British Trees by The Tree Council in 2002.

== See also ==
- List of Great British Trees
- List of individual trees
