= Botternell =

Hamlet in east Cornwall, England

Coordinates: 50.5455°N 4.4312°W

Botternell is a hamlet in the parish of North Hill, east Cornwall in the United Kingdom. The name means "Dornel's dwelling". Boturnell, also in Cornwall, has the same meaning.

The earliest date for the village of Botternell is around the year.1160. By 1650, it consisted of two separate villages - higher and lower Bourtnell, (spelling varies).

By 1840, Botternel was no longer classified as a village. Today, Botternel consists of a farm of the same name and a small hamlet of five houses on the site. There is a bus stop in the hamlet.

== See also ==
- Stara Woods
