= Maders =

Hamlet in east Cornwall, England

Coordinates: 50°31′09″N 4°20′14″W

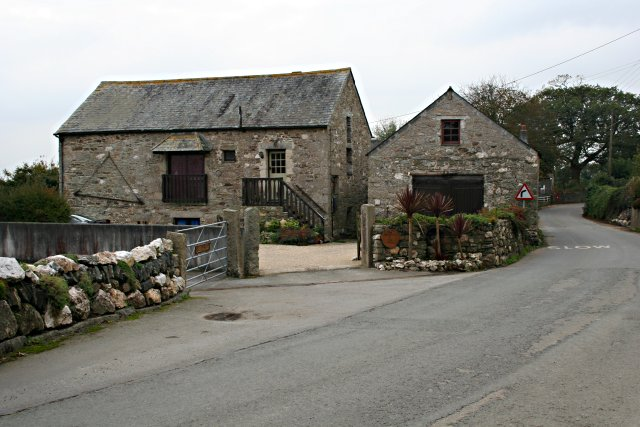
Converted farm buildings at Maders

Maders is a hamlet west of Kelly Bray in the parish of South Hill (where the population of the 2011 census was included) in east Cornwall, England.
