= Netherton, Cornwall =

Coordinates: 50.530°N 4.417°W

Netherton
- Location within Cornwall
- OS grid reference: SX288728
- Civil parish: Linkinhorne
- Unitary authority: Cornwall
- Ceremonial county: Cornwall
- Region: South West
- Country: England
- Sovereign state: United Kingdom

Netherton is a hamlet in the parish of Linkinhorne, Cornwall, England.
