= Gang, Cornwall =

Hamlet in east Cornwall, England

Coordinates: 50.49°N 4.387°W

Gang: Cornish: Eylatal
- Hamlet
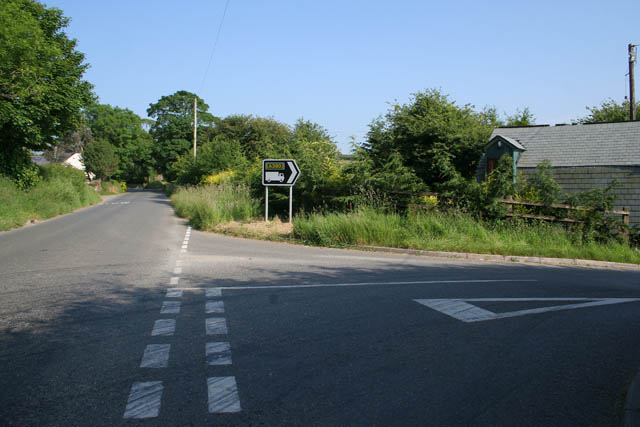

- Location within Cornwall
- Unitary authority: Cornwall
- Region: South West
- Country: England
- Sovereign state: United Kingdom
- Police: Devon and Cornwall
- Fire: Cornwall
- Ambulance: South Western

Gang (Cornish: Eylatal, meaning secondary mining waste) is a hamlet in the parish of St Ive and Pensilva in east Cornwall, England, UK.
