= St Germans and Landulph (electoral division) =

Former electoral division of Cornwall in the UK

- Former ward Cornwall Council
- Boundary of St Germans and Landulph in Cornwall from 2013-2021.
- County: Cornwall

2013–2021
- Number of councillors: One
- Replaced by: Lynher; Saltash Trematon and Landrake; Rame Peninsula and St Germans
- Created from: Constantine
- Number of councillors: One

St Germans and Landulph (Cornish: Lannaled ha Lanndhylyk) was an electoral division of Cornwall in the United Kingdom which returned one member to sit on Cornwall Council between 2013 and 2021. It was abolished at the 2021 local elections, being succeeded by Lynher, Saltash Trematon and Landrake and Rame Peninsula and St Germans.

== Councillors ==
Election	Member	Party
2013	Daniel Pugh	Conservative
2017	Jesse Foot	Liberal Democrat
2021	Seat abolished	

== Extent ==
St Germans and Landulph represented the villages of Trerulefoot, Polbathic, St Germans, Tideford, Landrake, Pillaton, Botusfleming, and the hamlets of Bethany, Budge's Shop, Markwell, St Erney, Hatt, Landulph, Landulph Cross and Cargreen. The division covered 6,128 hectares in total.

== Election results ==
=== 2017 election ===
2017 election: St Germans and Landulph
Party	Candidate	Votes	%	±%
Liberal Democrats	Jesse Foot	633	37.2	
Conservative	Daniel Pugh	628	36.9	
Independent	Chris Wilton	258	15.2	
Independent	Mervyn Ellis	178	10.5	
Majority		5	0.3	
Rejected ballots		5	0.3	
Turnout		1702	49.1	
Liberal Democrats gain from Conservative		Swing		

=== 2013 election ===
2013 election: St Germans and Landulph
Party	Candidate	Votes	%	±%
Conservative	Daniel Pugh	425	31.4	
UKIP	Joseph Cummins	384	28.4	
Liberal Democrats	Jesse Foot	370	27.3	
Independent	Mervyn Ellis	171	12.6	
Majority		41	3.0	
Rejected ballots		4	0.3	
Turnout		1354	39.1	
Conservative win (new seat)				
