= Darley (surname) =

Darley is a surname, and may refer to:

- Arthur Warren Darley (1873–1929), Irish violinist and folksong collector
- F. O. C. Darley (1822–1888), American illustrator
- Frederick Darley (architect) (1798–1872), Irish architect
- Frederick Matthew Darley (1830–1910), barrister and judge in New South Wales
- George Darley (1795–1846), Irish poet and author
- Harry Darley (born 2004), English cricketer
- Hugh Darley (1701–1771), Irish stonecutter and architect
- Jamie Lee Darley (born 1986), American model
- John Darley (bishop) (1799–1884), Irish Anglican bishop
- John Darley (politician) (born 1937), Australian politician
- John M. Darley (1938–2018), American social psychologist
- Julian Darley, British filmmaker and environmentalist
- Kevin Darley (born 1960), English jockey
- Mark Darley (1926–1991), Irish equestrian
- Oliver Darley, British singer and actor
- Paul Darley (born 1974), English rugby league footballer
- Peter Darley (born 1944), Australian rules footballer
- Sam Darley (born 1993), Australian rules footballer
- Thomas Darley (born 1664) English diplomat and thoroughbred breeder
- Victor Darley-Usmar (born 1956), British biologist and biochemist
- Ward Darley (1903–1979), American physician, educator and college head

== See also ==
- Darly
