= Henwood, Cornwall =

Hamlet in Cornwall, England

Coordinates: 50°32′03″N 4°26′44″W

Henwood
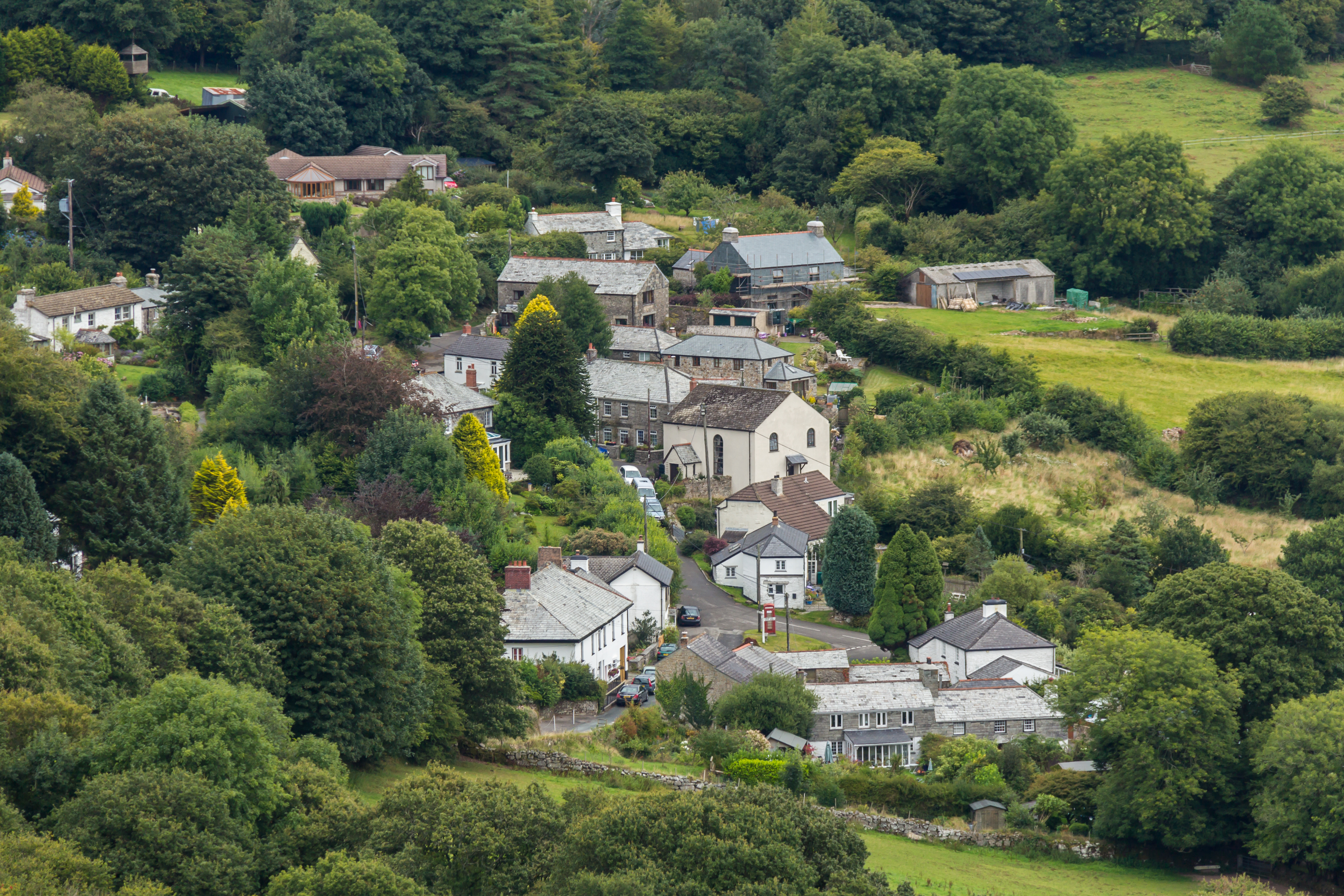
- Henwood from Stowe Hill

- Location within Cornwall
- Civil parish: Linkinhorne
- Unitary authority: Cornwall
- Ceremonial county: Cornwall
- Region: South West
- Country: England
- Sovereign state: United Kingdom
- Police: Devon and Cornwall
- Fire: Cornwall
- Ambulance: South Western

Henwood is a hamlet in the civil parish of Linkinhorne in east Cornwall, England.

== Location ==
Henwood is on the edge of Bodmin Moor and situated between Stowe's Hill (southwest) and Notter Tor (northeast).
