= North Darley =

Coordinates: 50.536°N 4.430°W

North Darley: Cornish: Dowr Legh
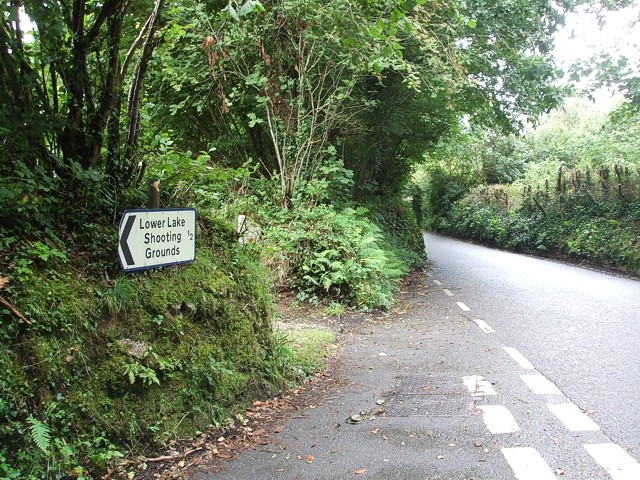
- Road junction at North Darley

- Location within Cornwall
- OS grid reference: SX279735
- Civil parish: Linkinhorne
- Unitary authority: Cornwall
- Ceremonial county: Cornwall
- Region: South West
- Country: England
- Sovereign state: United Kingdom

North Darley (Cornish: Dowr Legh, meaning rock slab river) is a hamlet in Cornwall, England. It is two miles south of North Hill on the B3254 road from Launceston to Liskeard.
