= Golberdon =

Coordinates: 50.517°N 4.358°W

Golberdon: Cornish: Goonwolber
- Location within Cornwall
- OS grid reference: SX329712
- Civil parish: South Hill
- Unitary authority: Cornwall
- Ceremonial county: Cornwall
- Region: South West
- Country: England
- Sovereign state: United Kingdom
- Post town: CALLINGTON
- Postcode district: PL17
- Dialling code: 01579
- Police: Devon and Cornwall
- Fire: Cornwall
- Ambulance: South Western
- UK Parliament: South East Cornwall

Golberdon (Cornish: Goonwolber) is a village in Cornwall, England situated 6 miles (9.7 km) north-east of Liskeard. Golberdon is in the civil parish of South Hill (where the 2011 census population was included).

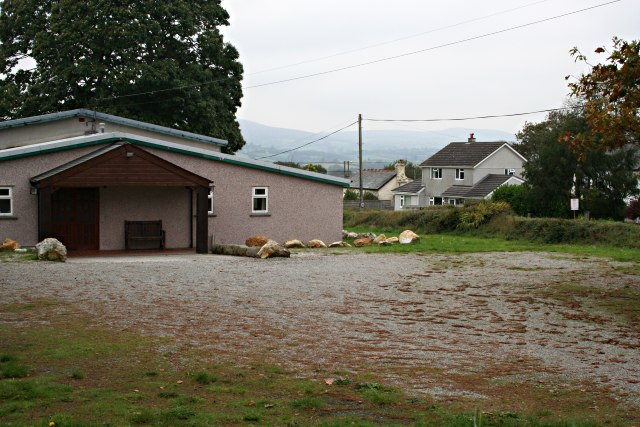
Golberdon Village Hall

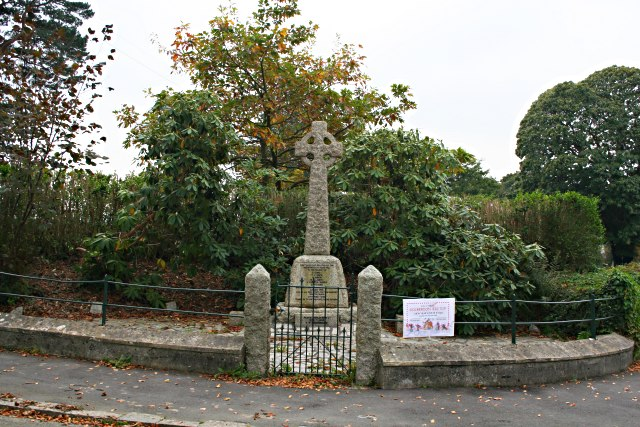
South Hill War Memorial
