= Ward Darley =

American physician and ex-president of the University of Colorado

Ward Darley, Jr., M.D. (1903–1979) was an American educator and physician who served as president of the University of Colorado and dean of its medical school.

He received his A.B. degree in 1926 and his M.D. in 1929, both from the University of Colorado. As an undergraduate, he was a charter member of Psi chapter of Phi Kappa Tau fraternity.

Upon completion of his medical degree, he worked for thirteen years in private practice in Denver. Darley joined the Colorado College of Medicine as professor in 1946 and served in that role until 1956, in addition to his administrative duties. He became dean of the Colorado College of Medicine in 1945 and became vice president for health sciences in 1949. Under his leadership the school made great strides, and a medical clinic established at Denver's General Hospital became a widely recognized educational experiment in comprehensive medical care, a special focus of Darley's career.

Darley was appointed President of the University of Colorado from 1953 to 1956.

Darley was active in the Association of American Medical Colleges throughout his career, serving as its president in 1952 and assuming the role as its administrative head in 1956.

He was awarded honorary degrees from more than twelve universities. In 1964 he received the Association of American Medical Colleges' Abraham Flexner Award for Distinguished Service to Medical Education, its highest honor. In 1971, he became a Master of the American College of Physicians.

He donated his papers to the National Library of Medicine in 1968.
