= Trevigro =

Coordinates: 50°30′14″N 4°20′35″W

Trevigro is a hamlet in Cornwall, England, United Kingdom. It is about two miles west of Callington.
