= Cheesewring =

Granite tor on Bodmin Moor in Cornwall, England

Coordinates: 50°31′31.28″N 4°27′33.46″W

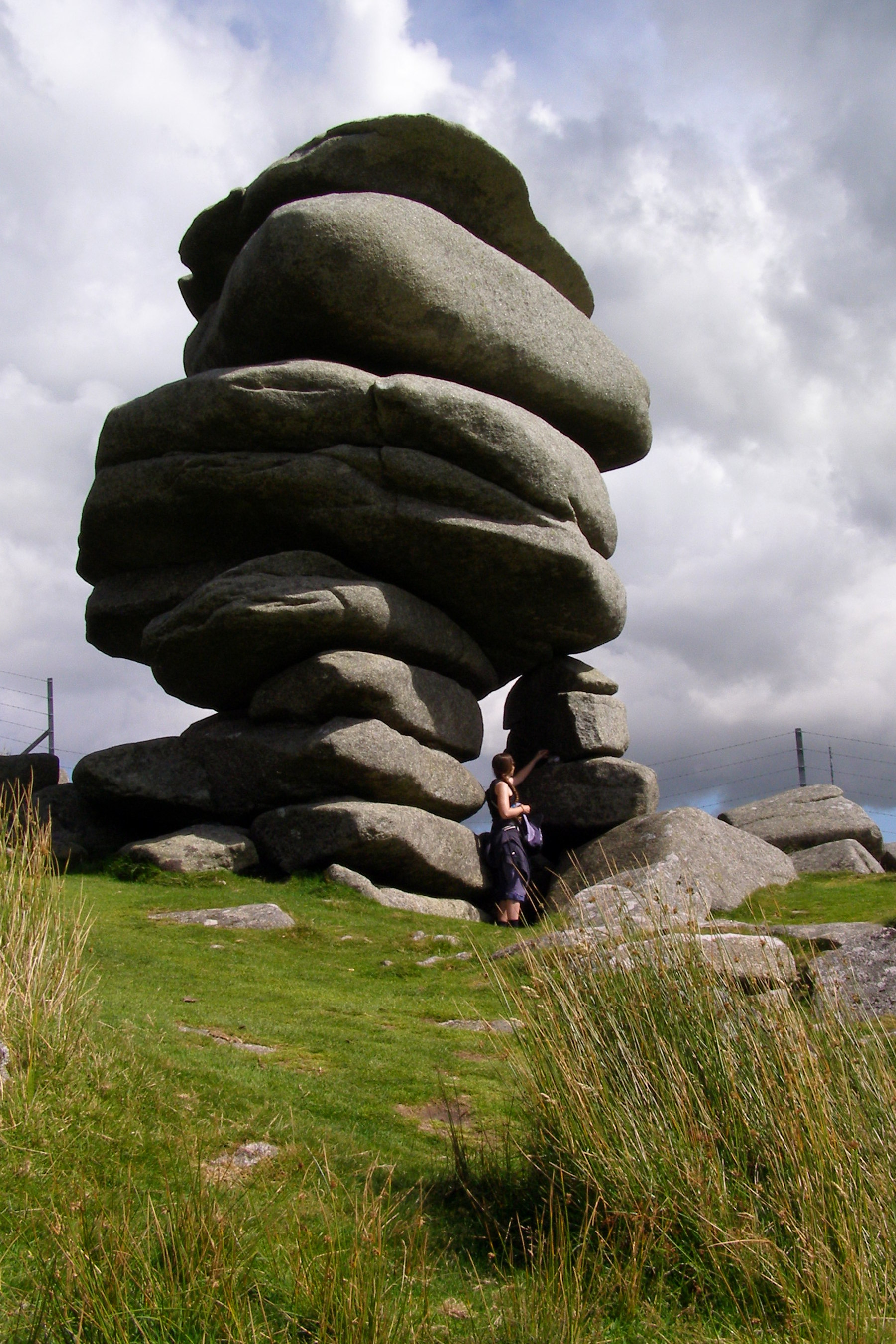
The Cheesewring, with an adult visitor for scale

The Cheesewring (Cornish: Keuswask) is a granite tor in Cornwall, England, situated on the eastern flank of Bodmin Moor on Stowe's Hill in the parish of Linkinhorne approximately one mile northwest of the village of Minions and four miles (6 km) north of Liskeard. It is a natural geological formation, a rock outcrop of granite slabs formed by weathering. The name derives from the resemblance of the piled slabs to a stack of "cheeses" in a traditional cider press.

Wilkie Collins described the Cheesewring in 1861 in his book Rambles Beyond Railways:

If a man dreams of a great pile of stones in a nightmare, he would dream of such a pile as the Cheesewring. All the heaviest and largest of the seven thick slabs of which it is composed are at the top; all the lightest and smallest at the bottom. It rises perpendicularly to a height of thirty-two feet, without lateral support of any kind. The fifth and sixth rocks are of immense size and thickness, and overhang fearfully all round the four lower rocks which support them. All are perfectly irregular; the projections of one do not fit into the interstices of another; they are heaped up loosely in their extraordinary top-heavy form on slanting ground, half way down a steep hill.

Located adjacent to the Cheesewring Quarry (which supplied the granite cladding for the structure of Tower Bridge, London) and surrounded by other granite formations, this landmark was threatened with destruction in the late nineteenth century by the proximity of blasting operations, but was saved as a result of local activism.

== Legend ==
A local legend says that the Cheesewring is the result of a contest between a man and a giant. When Christianity had just been introduced to Britain, the giants who lived at the top of the mountains were not happy about it. The saints had invaded their land and were declaring their wells as sacred. One of the larger giants, Uther, was given the task of ridding their land of the saints. He confronted the frail Saint Tue, who proposed a rock throwing contest. If Uther won, the saints would leave Cornwall. If Saint Tue won, then the giants would convert to Christianity. Uther took his turn first and easily threw a small rock to the top of nearby Stowe's Hill. Tue prayed for assistance, and picking up a huge slab found it was very light. One after the other, they threw their rocks, stacking them up in perfect piles. When the score was twelve stones each, Uther threw a thirteenth stone, but it rolled down the hill. Tue picked up this fallen stone, and as he lifted it, an angel appeared to carry it to the top of the pile of rocks. Seeing this, Uther conceded, and most of the giants decided to follow Christianity after that.

== Notable residents ==
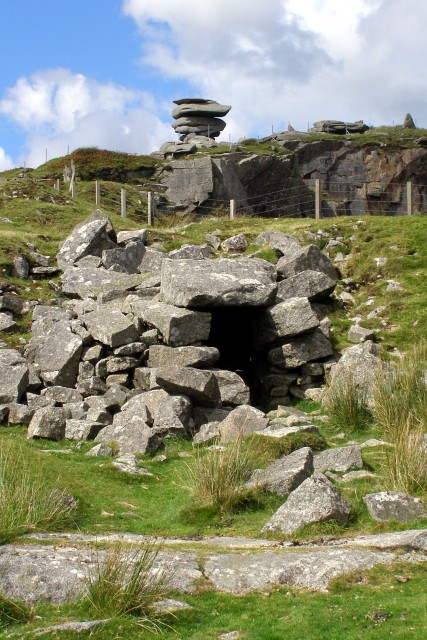
Partial reassembled remnant of Daniel Gumb's Cave - original location quarried away

- Daniel Gumb (d. 1776), stonemason, lived in a cave on the moor with his family, to avoid paying taxes; several gravestones in Linkinhorne churchyard were carved by him.
