= Parkfield, Cornwall =

Hamlet in Cornwall, England

Coordinates: 50.481°N 4.376°W

Parkfield
- Location within Cornwall
- OS grid reference: SX315673
- Civil parish: St Ive and Pensilva
- Unitary authority: Cornwall
- Ceremonial county: Cornwall
- Region: South West
- Country: England
- Sovereign state: United Kingdom

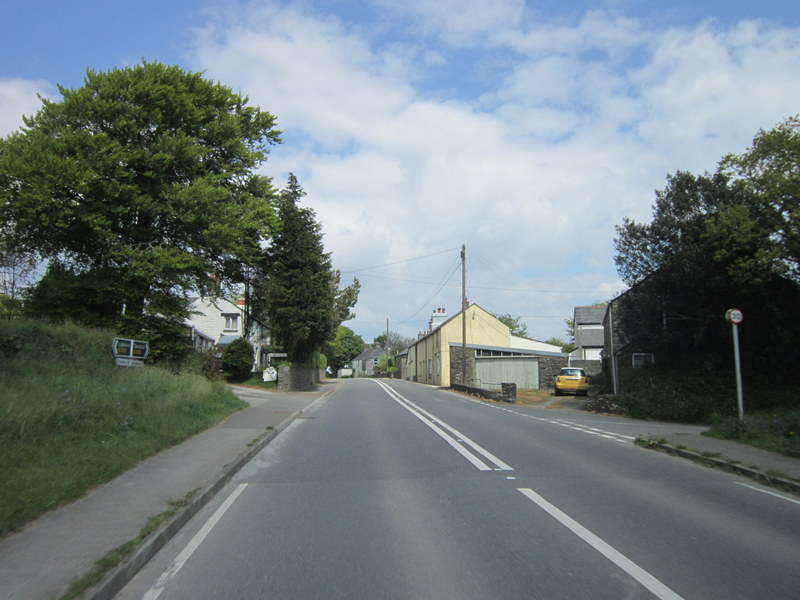
The A390 at St Ive Parkfield

Parkfield is a hamlet in the parish of St Ive and Pensilva, Cornwall, England.
