= Plushabridge =

Coordinates: 50.527°N 4.397°W

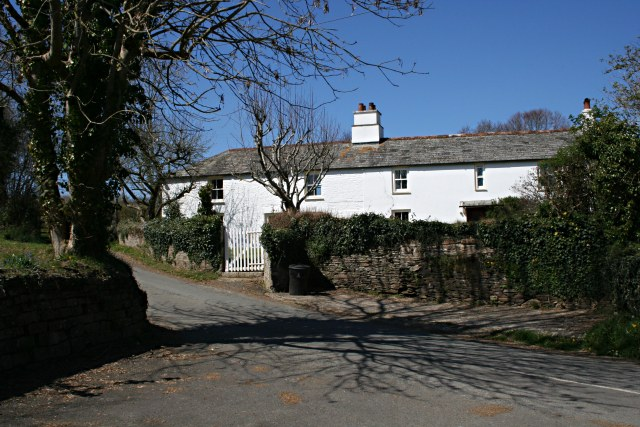
- Houses at Plushabridge

- Location within Cornwall
- OS grid reference: SX302724
- Civil parish: Linkinhorne
- Unitary authority: Cornwall
- Ceremonial county: Cornwall
- Region: South West
- Country: England
- Sovereign state: United Kingdom

Plushabridge is a hamlet in the parish of Linkinhorne in east Cornwall, England.
