= Middlehill, Cornwall =

Hamlet in Cornwall, England

Coordinates: 50°29′N 4°24′W

Middlehill is a hamlet in the parish of St Ive and Pensilva, Cornwall, England.
