= Francesca Maria Steele =

English novelist, historian, and biographer

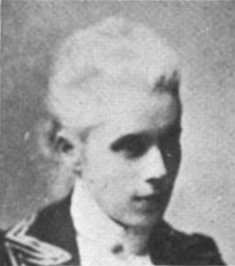
- Born: Fanny Maria Steele; 21 April 1848; Dalston, Hackney, London, England
- Died: 16 August 1931 (aged 83); Stroud, Gloucestershire, England
- Other names: Darley Dale
- Occupations: Novelist and biographer
- Years active: 1878–1925
- Known for: Biographies of saints
- Notable work: The convents of Great Britain and Ireland

Francesca Maria Steele (21 April 1848 – 10 August 1931) was an English novelist, historian, and biographer, who began writing to support her family. She began her writing career with juvenile fiction; she later moved into adult fiction, using the pseudonym Darley Dale for her fiction writing. Intensely religious, she converted to Roman Catholicism in 1887 and later wrote several books on religious topics.

== Early life ==
Steele was born in London on 21 April 1848. (Note: The index of births shows that Steele was born in the second quarter of 1848. However, she was baptised in St Peter's Church, West Hackney on 26 May 1848) Her parents were Robert Peter Steele (1816 – 10 May 1884), the secretary of the Royal Assurance Company and Frances Mary Francis (8 February 1818 – 3 October 1902).

Steele was educated at Bedford College, London, the first higher education college for women in the United Kingdom. Steele lived in Jersey from 1874 to 1884. She began writing in Jersey, with The Jersey Boys in 1878. Her father died on 10 May 1884, and his pension died with him. He had lost everything else in a bank collapse, so Steele's mother was now dependent on what Steele could earn from her writing.

Steele moved to Gloucestershire with her mother and sisters. Steele and her sister Alice Mary (1856 – c. 1935) converted to Roman Catholicism in 1877. Alice went on to become a nun and was the sister in charge at Tyburn Convent at 6 Hyde Park Place, in London at the time of the 1911 census. Alice was still in charge there twenty years later when Steele died.

Steele had already moved to Loretto House at Stroud in Gloucestershire when her mother died there on 3 October 1902. She was still there nearly thirty years later when she died. Even after her mother died, Steele was still supporting her youngest sister, Emma Caroline, when she applied to the Royal Literary Fund in 1914.

== Name variants ==
Steele was registered at birth and baptised as Fanny Maria Steele, and she used this name up until the 1891 census. By the 1901 census she was using the name Florence Steel, but soon changed to Francesca Maria Steele. She used this name for the publication of The Convents of Great Britain in 1902. In the 1911 Census, she used that form of her name also, and continued to do so. For her writing, she used the pseudonym Darley Dale for all of her fiction, but used her real name for her writing on religious topics.

== Works ==
Steele's work can be divided into three types:

- Juvenile fiction. Indicated by juv. in the table below. Steele wrote about 20 books for children. (Note: It is not always clear what category Steele's books fit into, and the list in Who Was Who does not indicate the category for all of her books, and it is possible that there are volumes that are not listed here.) Children's books were usually illustrated and printed in a single volume.
- Adult fiction. Indicated by adt. in the table below. Steele wrote over a dozen adult novels. The earlier adult novels were published in as three-volume novels volumes. This was the norm at the time, as such a format had an appeal to circulating libraries.
- Religious topics. Indicated by rel. in the table below. Steele wrote biographies of saints and of important figures in church history, as well as her survey of convents and monasteries. She contributed 21 articles to the Catholic Encyclopedia.

The sources for the table are:

- The Jisc Library Hub Discover Database, that collates catalogues from 161 academic and specialist libraries across the UK and Ireland.
- The list in the Who Was Who article for Steele.
- The author page for Steele on the At the Circulating Library: A Database of Victorian Fiction, 1837-1901

There seem to be no works by Steele at Project Gutenberg, so the table indicated those cases where online versions of the texts are available.

Books by Steele
No	Year	Title	Illustrator	Type	Publisher	Pages	Notes
1	1878	The Jersey Boys		juv.	RTS, London		(Note: Title from Who Was Who.)
2	1879	Helen Leslie; or, "A Little Leaven"		juv.	Frederick Warne & Co, London	192 pages, (8º)	(Note: A book in Warne's Home Circle Library.)
3	1880	A Tearful Victory. A story for children		juv.	SPCK, London	128 pages, (8º)	
4	1881	The black donkey; or, The Guernsey boys		juv.	SPCK, London	cm.16	
5	1882	Little Bricks		juv.	James Nisbet & Co, London	231 pages, (8º)	(Note: On-line at the Internet Archive.)
6	1882	The Family Failing		juv.	Blackie & Son, London	221 pages, (8º)	(Note: Year of publication from Who Was Who. On-line at the Internet Archive and at The British Library.)
7	1882	Cissy's Troubles		juv.	James Nisbet & Co, London	233 pages, (8º)	(Note: Year of publication from Who Was Who.)
8	1883	Spoilt Guy		juv.	James Nisbet & Co, London	cm.18	
9	1884	Seven sons; or, The story of Malcolm and his brothers		juv.	James Nisbet & Co, London	cm.18	
10	1885	Fanny's king: and other stories		juv.	Blackie & Son, London	64 p., [1] leaf of plates, ill., 15.2 cm.	
11	1885	The wild marsh-marigolds		juv.	London	cm.15	
12	1885	The great auk's eggs	Charles Whymper	juv.	RTS, London	158,[2]p., [1] leaf of plates, ill., 18 cm.	
13	1886	Oughts and Crosses: or, Mr. Holland's conquest		juv.	J. Nisbet & Co, London	269 pages, (8º)	
14	1886	Fair Katherine		adt.	Hurst & Blackett, London	3 volumes, (8º)	
15	1886	Swallow-tails and skippers	Lucy Francis	juv.	RTS, London	158 p., 1 col. ill., 19 cm.	(Note: Year of publication from Who Was Who. On-line at the Internet Archive.)
16	1887	The glory of the sea		juv.	RTS, London	cm.18	
17	1887	The Shepherd's Fairy: a pastorale		juv.	RTS, London	208 pages, (8º)	
18	1889	Mr. Mygale's Hobby: a story about spiders	Charles Whymper	juv.	RTS, London	192 pages, (8º)	
19	1890	Noah's ark: a tale of the Norfolk Broads	Paul Hardy	juv.	Frederick Warne and Co, London	280, [8] p., ill., 20 cm.	
20	1892	The little doctor: or, The magic of nature	Alexander Monro	juv.	Wells Gardner, Darton & Co, London	209, [7] p., ill., 20 cm.	
21	1892	The Village Blacksmith		adt.	Hutchinson & Co, London	3 volumes, (8º)	(Note: On-line at The British Library.)
22	1893	Lottie's wooing, by Darley Dale		adt.	Hutchinson & Co, London	3 vols. cm.19	
23	1894	The Game of Life. A novel		adt.	Hutchinson & Co, London	3 volumes, (8º)	
24	1896	Willy's Flower.		juv.	Blackie & Son, London	16 pages, (16º)	(Note: Extracted from Fanny's King, and other stories.)
25	1896	A Modern Comedy of Errors		adt.			(Note: Title from Who Was Who, Serialised in London Society.)
26	1897	Stella's story: a Venetian tale	Paul Woodroffe	juv.	J. S. Virtue and Co, London	248 p., 8 ill., 20 cm.	
27	1897	Chloe		adt.	Bliss, Sands & Co, London	352 pages, (8º)	
28	1898	Cupid's Crooked Ways		adt.			(Note: Title from Who Was Who, Ran as a serial in the Glasgow Weekly Herald.)
29	1899	Justice Meadows: or the Golden Tree of Knowledge		adt.			(Note: Title from Who Was Who, ran as a serial in The Englishwoman.)
30	1902	The convents of Great Britain		rel.	Sands & Co, London	xxv, 320 pages, 25 leaves of plates, portraits (black and white), 19 cm	
31	1902	The Daughters of Job		adt.	R. A. Everett & Co, London	390 pages, (8º)	
32	1902	Monasteries and Religious House of Great Britain and Ireland. With an appendix on the religious houses in America		rel.	R. & T. Washbourne, London	xv, 267 pages, (8º)	
33	1903	The House that Jack built		adt.	R. A. Everett & Co, London	313 pages, (8º)	
34	1903	Anchoresses of the West		rel.	Sands & Co, London	xxii, 261 pages, (8º)	
35	1903	The Flighty Duchess		adt.			(Note: Title from Who Was Who. No other information found on this title.)
36	1904	Brother Francis. A novel		adt.	R. A. Everett & Co, London	316 pages, (8º)	
37	1905	The Mirror of St. Edmund. Done into modern English.		rel.	Burns & Oates, London	x, 80 pages, (16º)	
38	1907	Naomi's transgression		adt.	Frederick Warne and Co, London	vi, 306, [6] p., [6] l. of plates, ill., 20 cm.	(Note: Who Was Who lists this as an adult novel, but the presence of six illustrations may suggest that it is juvenile fiction.)
39	1908	The story of the English Pope		rel.	Macdonald and Evans, London	177 p, col. ill, 17 cm.	(Note: Part of the publisher's St. Nicholas series.)
40	1909	St. Bridget of Sweden		rel.	R. & T. Washbourne, London	xxviii, 140 p., frontis., 8º.	
41	1910	The story of the Bridgettines		rel.	R. & T. Washbourne, London	19 cm.	
42	1910	The Beautiful Queen, Joanna I. of Naples		rel.	Hutchinson & Co, London	vii, 347 pages, (8º)	
43	1914	The life and visions of St. Hildegarde		rel.	Heath Cranton, London	xiv, 246 p., frontis., 19 cm.	
44	1921	The Life of Saint Walburga		rel.	Heath Cranton, London	189 pages, (8º)	
45	1922	Old Mrs. Graham		adt.	Hutchinson & Co, London	286 p., 8º.	
46	1923	The Master of the House		adt.	Heath Cranton, London	290 p., C	
47	1925	The convents of Great Britain and Ireland		rel.	London	8º.	
48	1928	The Little Widow, 2nd edition		adt.			

=== Example of illustration of one of Steele's books ===
The following four illustrations by AFB were produced for The Family Failing (1883) by Steele (courtesy of The British Library) Typically, at the time, when it came to novels, only juvenile fiction was illustrated, although serial stories were often illustrated, even if they were for adults.

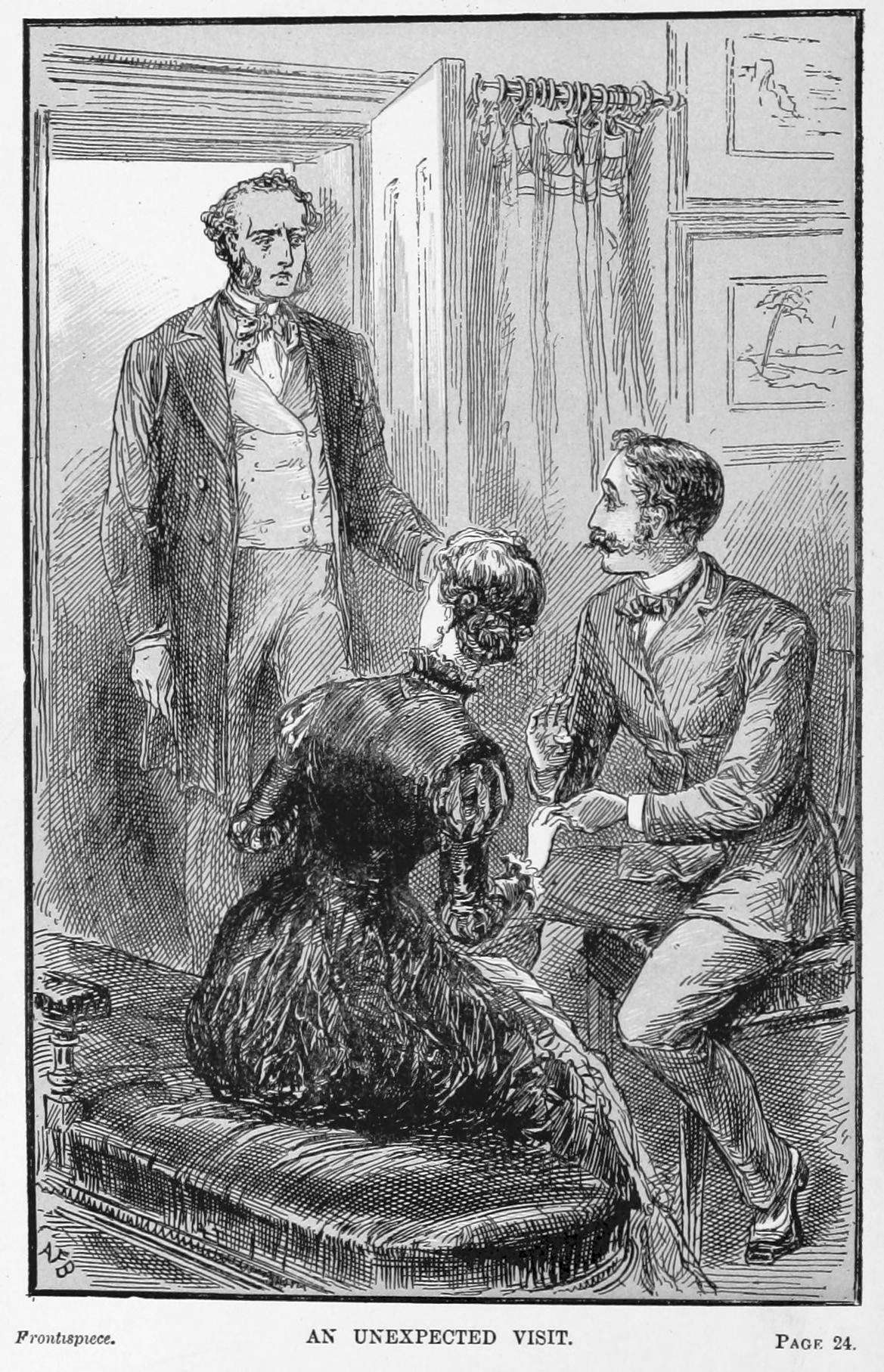
An unexpected visitor

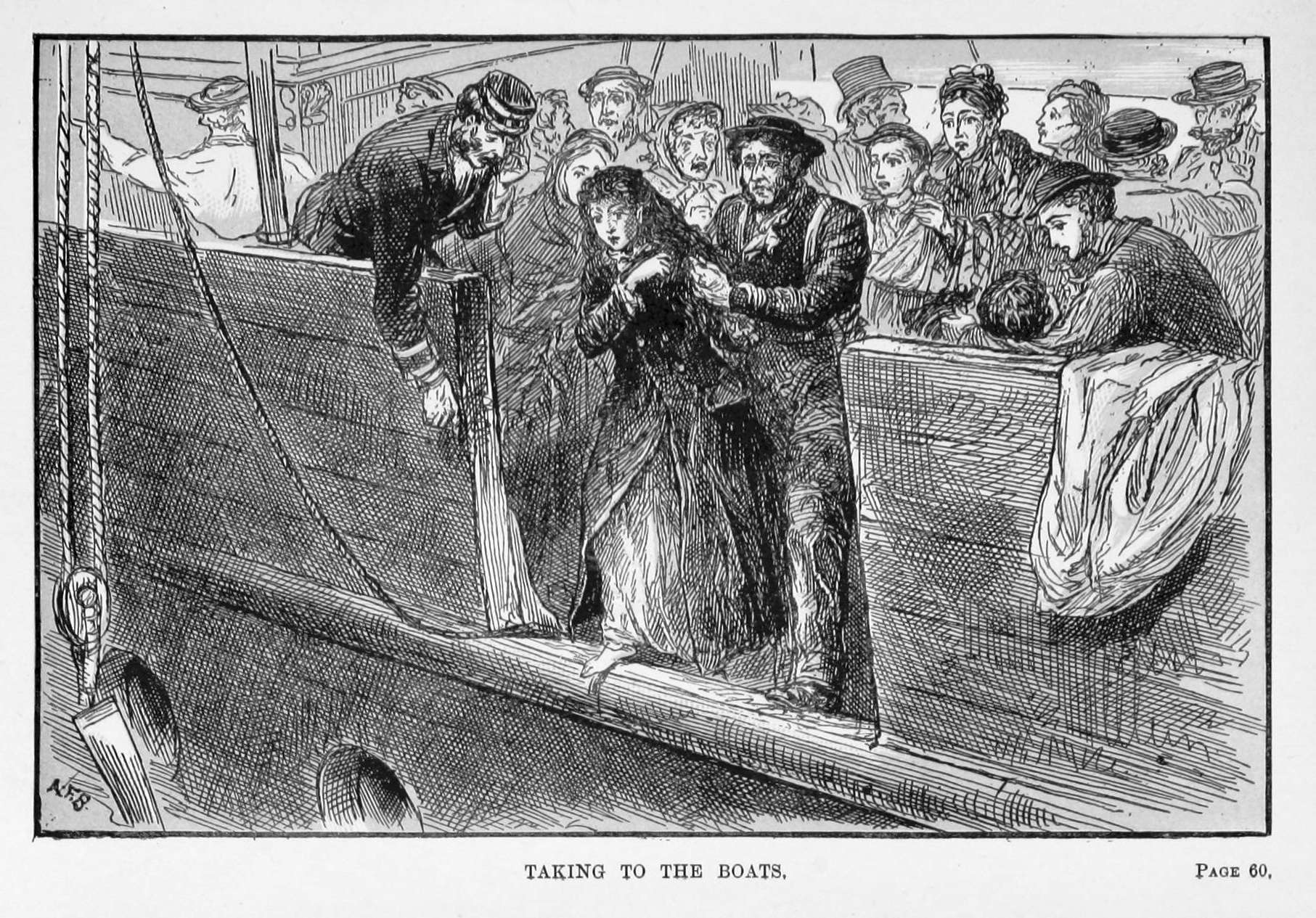
Taking to the boats

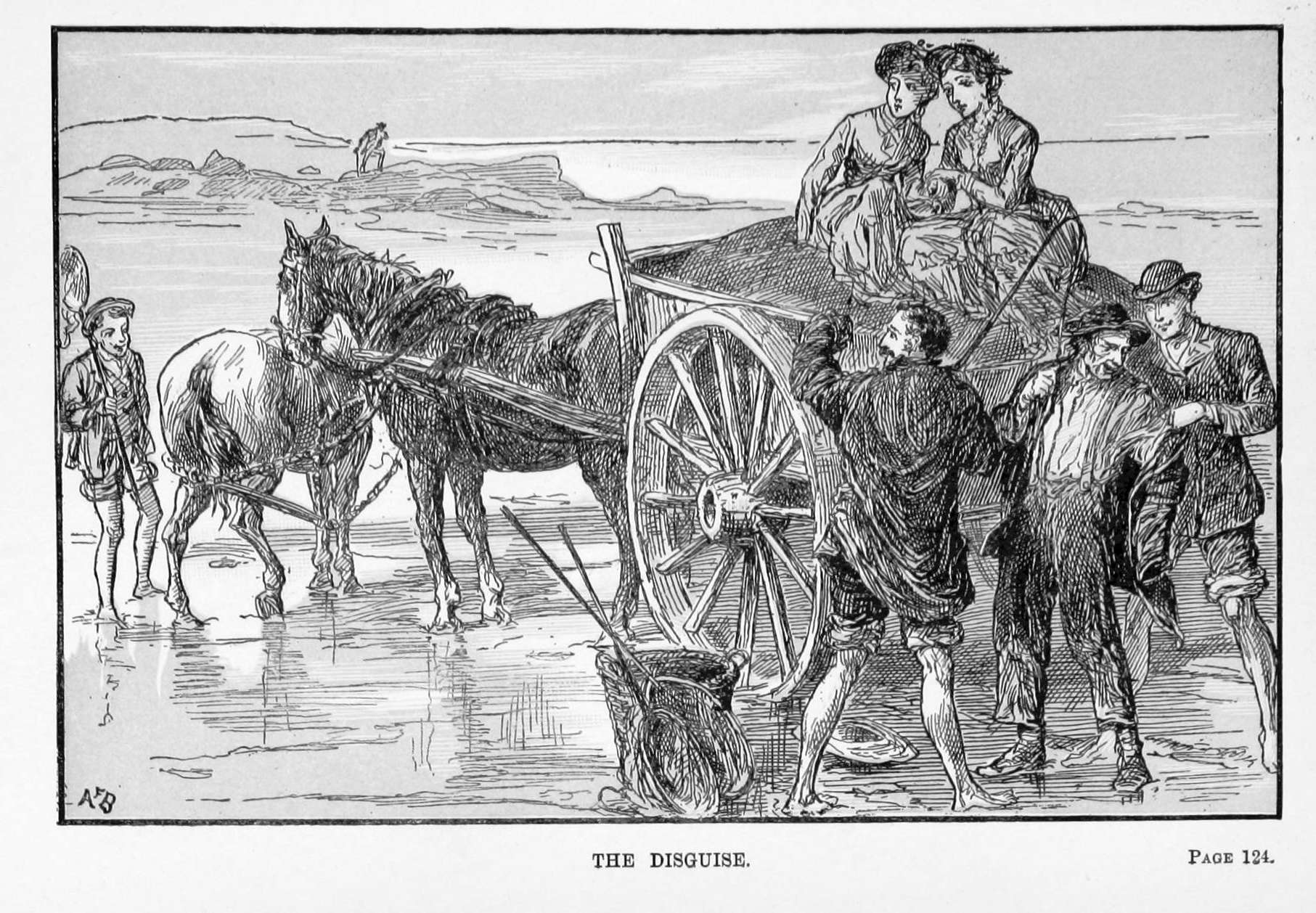
A disguise

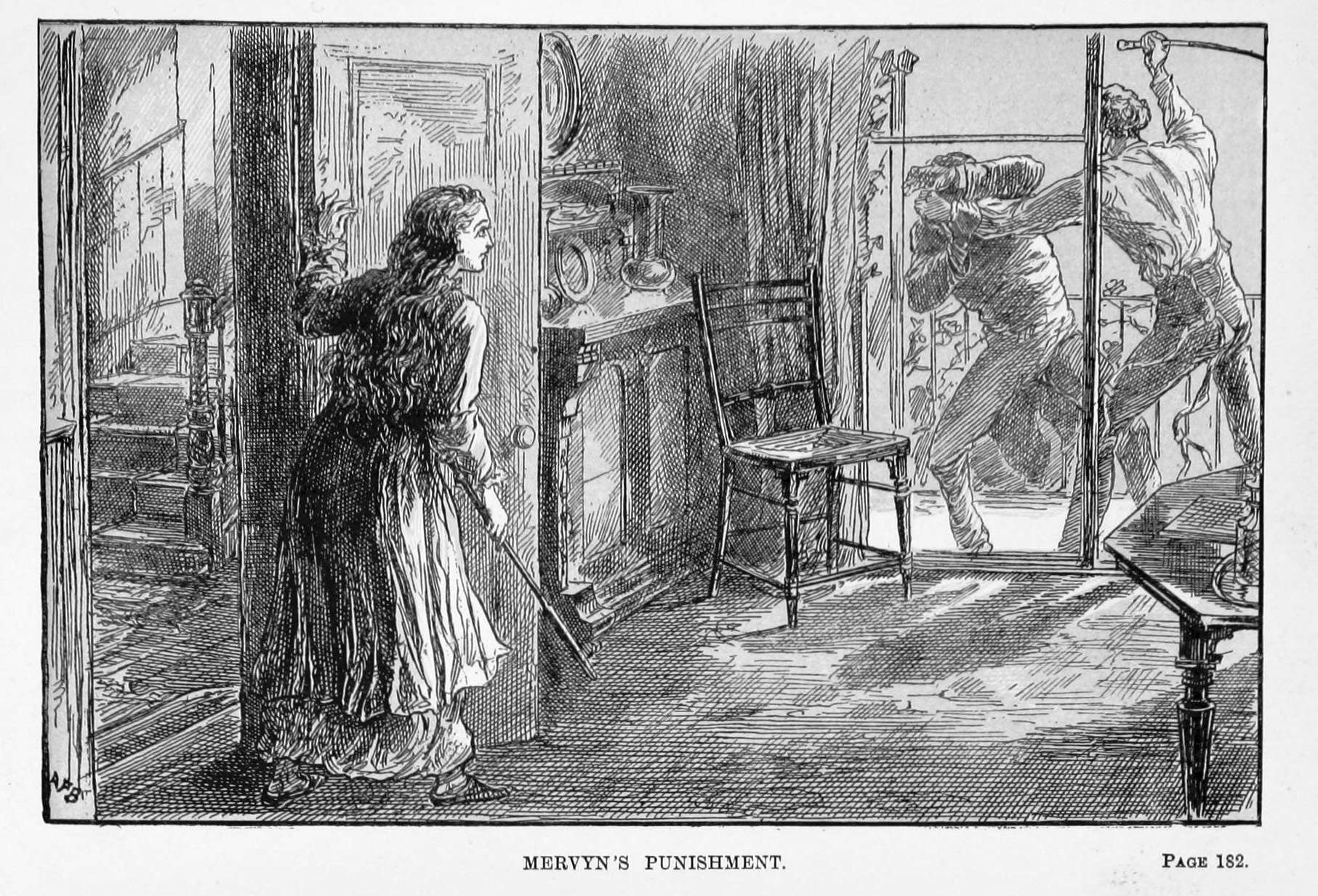
Meryvn's punishment

== Later life ==
At the time of the 1911 Census, Steele was living with her sister Emma Caroline at Loretto House in Stroud. Whatever income she had from her writing, it was obviously not enough as she applied for assistance from the Royal Literary Fund in 1914. In her later years, Steele was an invalid. She died on 16 August 1931, leaving a relatively modest estate of less than £400. Her sister Emma Caroline was her executor, and only survived her sister by four years, dying on 9 December 1935.
