= Bray Shop =

Coordinates: 50.5463°N 4.3575°W

Bray Shop: Cornish: Shoppa Bre
- Location within Cornwall
- OS grid reference: SX331745
- Civil parish: Linkinhorne, Stoke Climsland and South Hill
- Shire county: Cornwall
- Region: South West
- Country: England
- Sovereign state: United Kingdom
- Post town: CALLINGTON
- Postcode district: PL17
- Dialling code: 01579
- Police: Devon and Cornwall
- Fire: Cornwall
- Ambulance: South Western
- UK Parliament: South East Cornwall

Bray Shop (Cornish: Shoppa Bre) is a village in east Cornwall, England, United Kingdom, in the civil parish of Linkinhorne, Stoke Climsland and South Hill. It is located on the B3257 approximately three miles north-northwest of Callington. It is in the civil parish of Linkinhorne, Stoke Climsland and South Hill.
