= St Ive Cross =

Hamlet in Cornwall, England

St Ive Cross is a hamlet east of St Ive in east Cornwall, England, United Kingdom.
