= Linkinhorne =

Civil parish and village in south-east Cornwall, England

Coordinates: 50.538°N 4.373°W

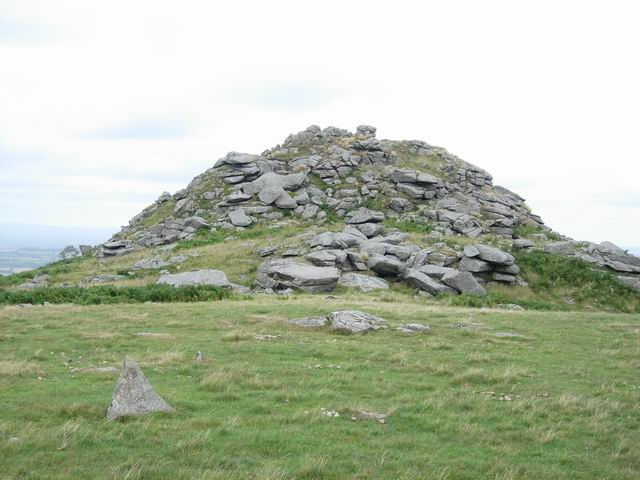
Sharp Tor

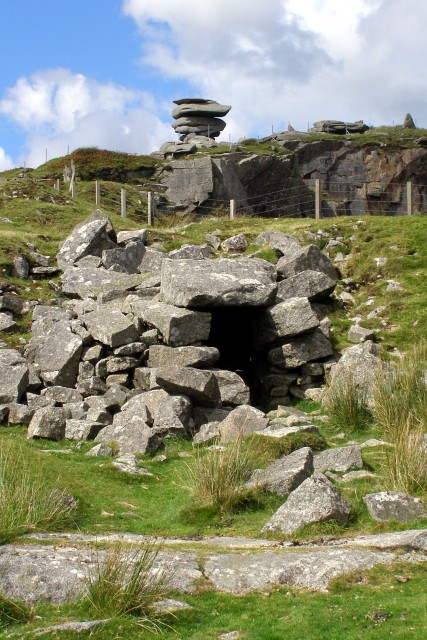
Remnant of Daniel Gumb's cave, with the Cheesewring on the skyline behind

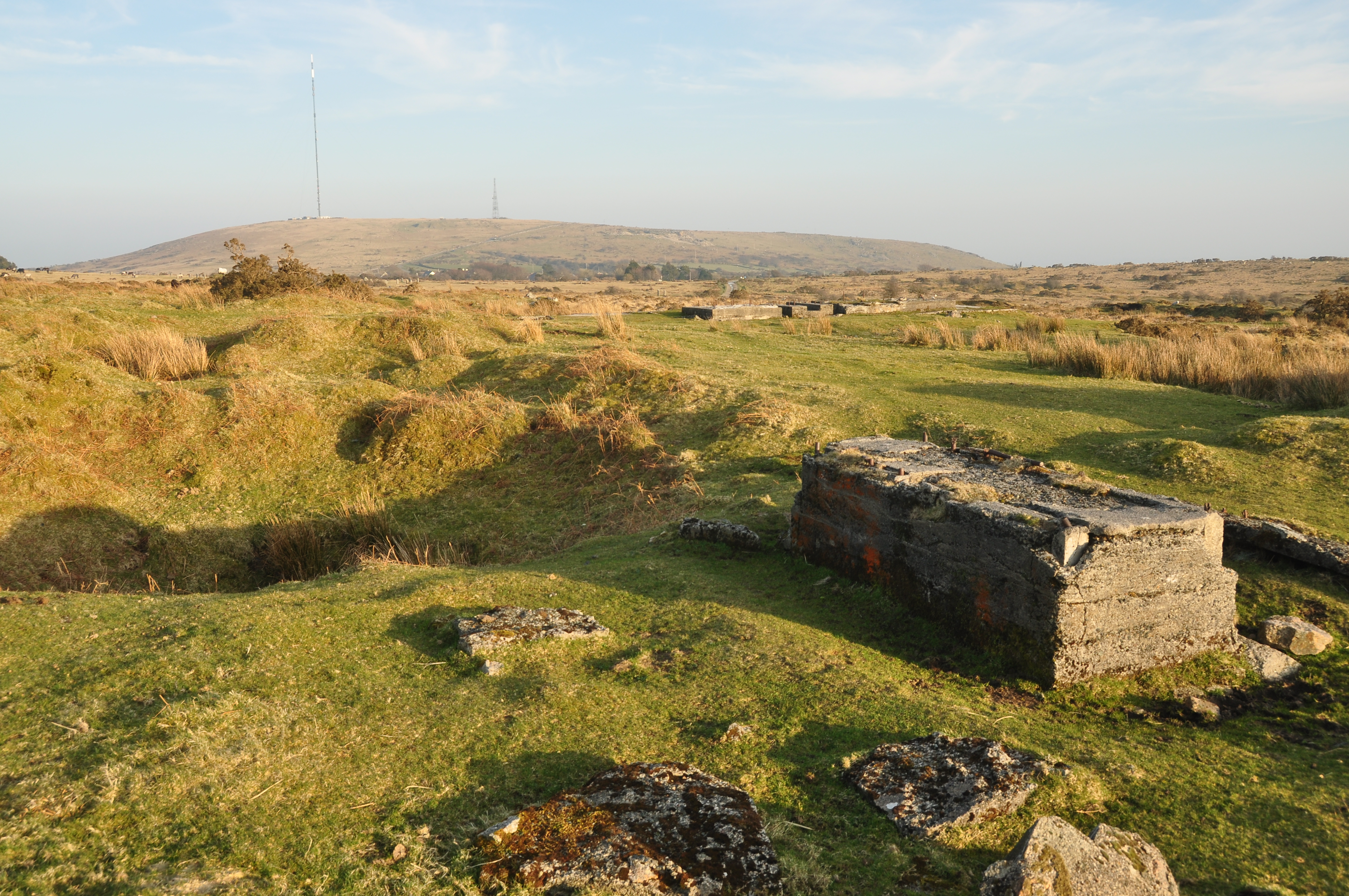
Mine workings near Caradon Hill

Linkinhorne (Cornish: Lanngenhorn) is a civil parish and village in southeast Cornwall, England, United Kingdom. The village itself is situated at grid reference SX 320 736 and is approximately four miles (6.4 km) northwest of Callington and seven miles (11 km) south of Launceston. The parish population at the 2011 census including Downgate was 1,541

== Geography ==
As well as Linkinhorne village, other settlements in the parish include (in alphabetical order) Bray Shop, Caradon Town, Downgate, Henwood, Ley Mill, Minions, Netherton, Plushabridge, Rilla Mill, Sharptor and Upton Cross. The area is bordered by the River Inny in the north-east and Bodmin Moor to the west. The valley of the River Lynher runs through the parish.

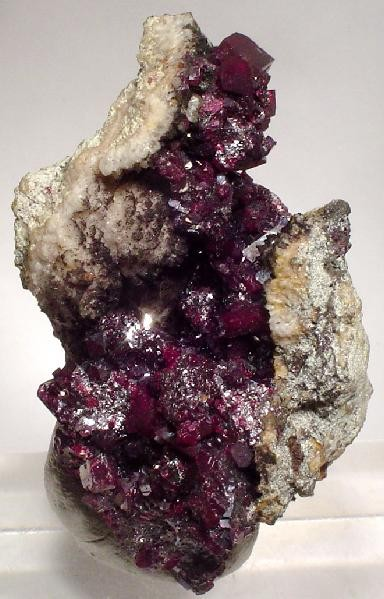
Old specimen of dark cherry-red cuprite crystals to 6 mm from the Wheal Phoenix mine

== History ==
Linkinhorne parish is within the Deanery and Hundred of East and is bounded on the north by North Hill and Lezant, on the east by Stoke Climsland and South Hill, on the south and west by St Ive and St Cleer. The name Linkinhorne means church site (Lann) of Kenhoarn. In the Domesday Book of 1086, the manor is referred to as Resleston (town by the ford) (Rillaton).

The parish is largely rural, although west of the B3254 road from Launceston to Liskeard, the parish includes part of Caradon Hill, once an industrialised mining area.

The parish church of St Melor is built of granite and dates from the 15th century. The tower is 120 ft high and the features of the church include a medieval altar slab, a 13th-century font and 15th-century wall paintings. The north aisle and lofty tower are said to have been built at the expense of Henry Trecarrel. The church is a Grade I listed building. Daniel Gumb (d. 1776), a stonemason, lived in a cottage near the Cheesewring; several gravestones in Linkinhorne churchyard were carved by him.

In medieval times there were chapels at Trefrize and Caradon. Arthur Langdon (1896) records a Cornish cross and a cross base at North Coombe; and another cross base at Sturt's Corner. Andrew Langdon (1996) records the cross at Northcoombe (it was set up on a stone in 1908).

Also in the parish are the Holy Well of St Melor; a 15th-century bridge over the Lynher at Plushabridge; and near Minions the Rillaton round barrow (in which Bronze Age grave goods, including a gold beaker, were discovered in 1837). The Hurlers are a group of three stone circles near Upton Cross.

The manor of Rillaton was the head manor of the Hundred of East and one of the 17 Antiqua maneria of the Duchy of Cornwall.

== Cornish wrestling ==
William Pollard from Linkinhorne, won many tournaments from the mid to late 1800s. He became champion of England. He was 6 feet 2 inches high and weighed 220 pounds. He was champion of Cornwall for seven years to 1869.

John Blydh (1854–?) was born in Linkinhorne and emigrated to the US. He beat the famous American wrestler Tom Carkeek in a celebrated match in 1878.

James Gerry (1858–?) was also born in Linkinhorne and emigrated to the US. He beat the best men of America including Tom Carkeek. He also had some success in Cornwall, drawing a match with Sam Rundle.

== Notable people ==
- The Church of England priest Theophilus Wodenote was vicar of Linkinhorne from 1619 to 1651, when he was sequestered from his benefice on account of his adherence to the Royalist cause. He was restored to his vicarage in 1660, and was buried at Linkinhorne on 1 October 1662.
