= Rilla Mill =

Village in Cornwall, England

Coordinates: 50.53291°N 4.40657°W

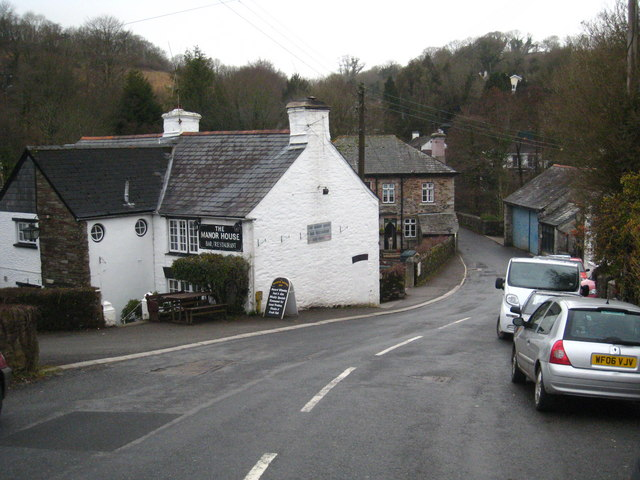
The Manor House Inn, Rilla Mill

Rilla Mill (Cornish: Melin Reslegh) is a small settlement in Cornwall, England, part of the civil parish of Linkinhorne, some 1 1/2 miles to the west of Linkinhorne village.

The New Bridge over the River Lynher at Rilla Mill replaced a medieval clapper bridge, which was demolished in the 1890s to make way for it.
