= Clapper bridge =

Bridge formed by large flat slabs of stone

Clapper Bridge
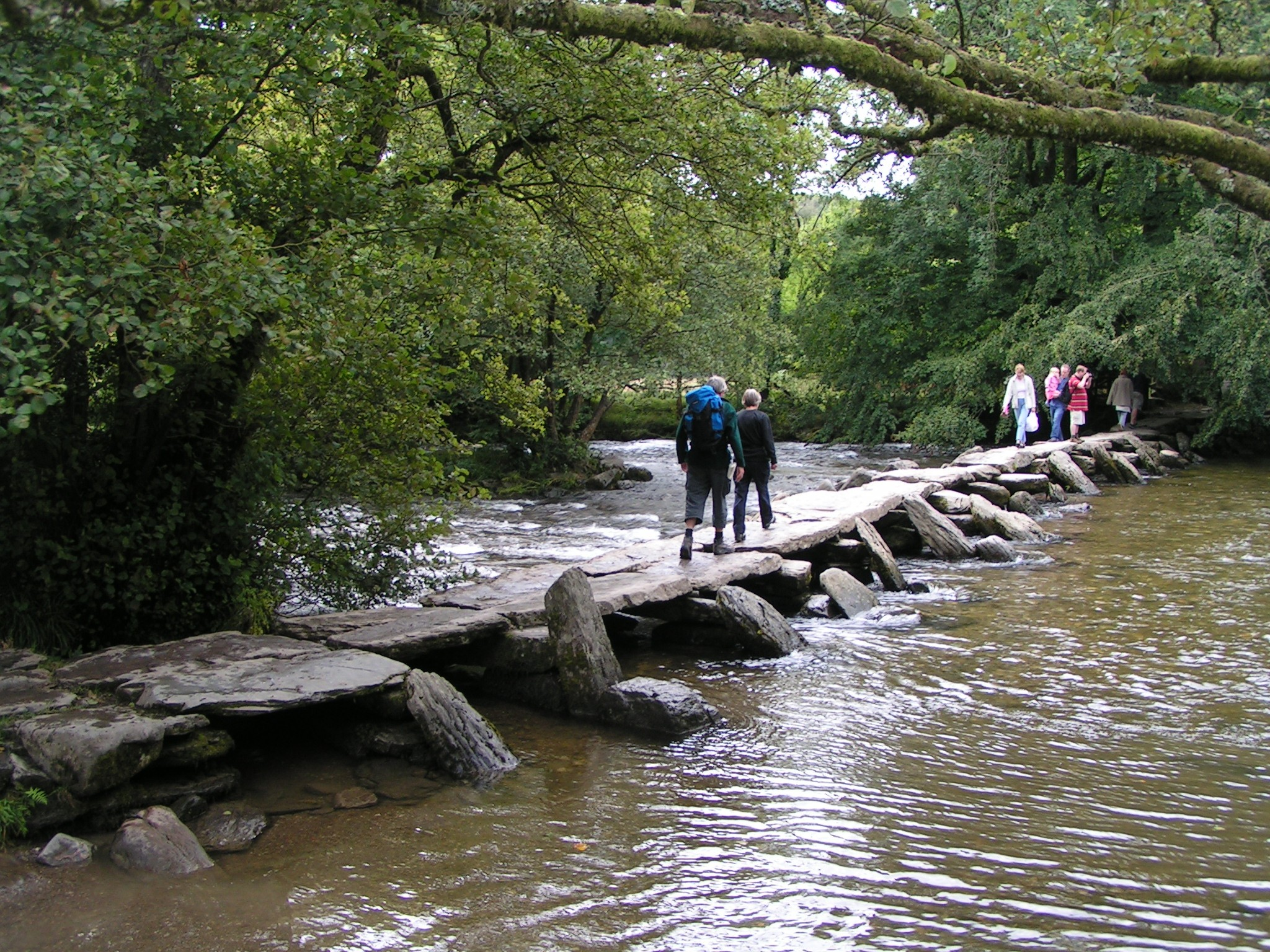
- Tarr Steps, Exmoor, Somerset, England
- Span range: Short
- Material: Stone
- Movable: No
- Design effort: Low
- Falsework required: No

A clapper bridge is an ancient form of bridge found on the moors of the English West Country (Bodmin Moor, Dartmoor and Exmoor) and in other upland areas of the United Kingdom including Snowdonia and Anglesey, Cumbria, Derbyshire, Yorkshire, Lancashire, and in northern Wester Ross and north-west Sutherland in Scotland. It is formed by large flat slabs of stone, often granite or schist. These can be supported on stone piers across rivers, or rest on the banks of streams.

== History ==
Although often credited with prehistoric origin, most were erected in medieval times, and some in later centuries. They are often situated close to a ford where carts could cross. According to the Dartmoor National Park, the word 'clapper' derives ultimately from an Anglo-Saxon word, cleaca, meaning 'bridging the stepping stones'; the Oxford English Dictionary gives the intermediate Medieval Latin form clapus, claperius, "of Gaulish origin", with an initial meaning of "a pile of stones". (Note: French and Provençal clapier developed the additional significance of a rabbit warren. (OED, s.v. "clapper".))

== Examples ==
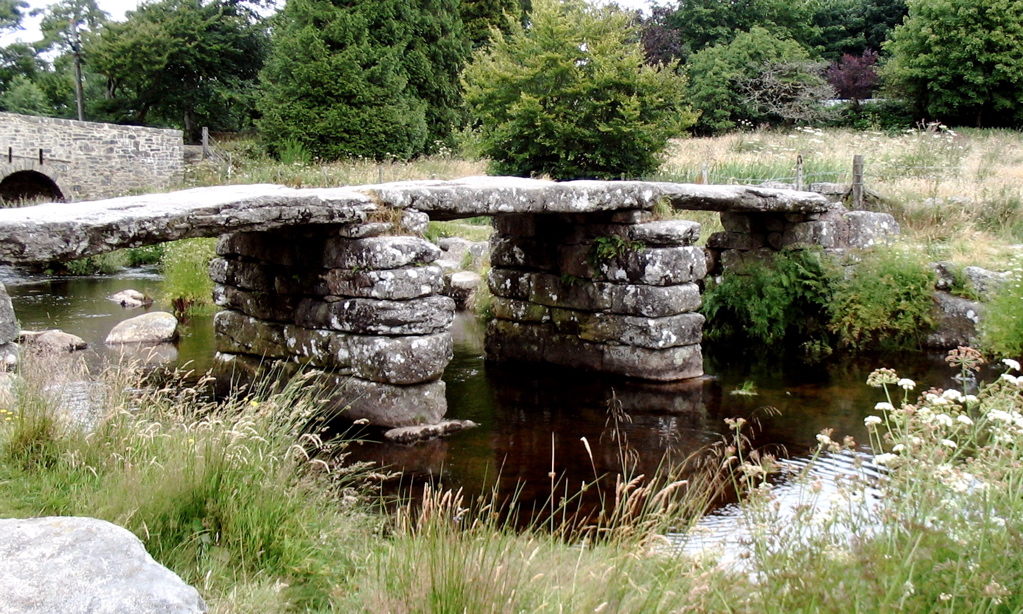
The clapper bridge at Postbridge

A fine example, the Postbridge Clapper Bridge, can be found at Postbridge, on Dartmoor. Its slabs are over 4 metres (13 ft) long, 2 metres (6 ft 7 in) wide and weigh over 8 metric tons (7.9 long tons; 8.8 short tons) each, making the bridge passable to a small cart. It was first recorded in 1380 and was built to facilitate the transportation of Dartmoor tin by pack horses to the stannary town of Tavistock.

Other surviving examples include the Tarr Steps over the River Barle in Exmoor, and Stara Bridge over the River Lynher in east Cornwall.

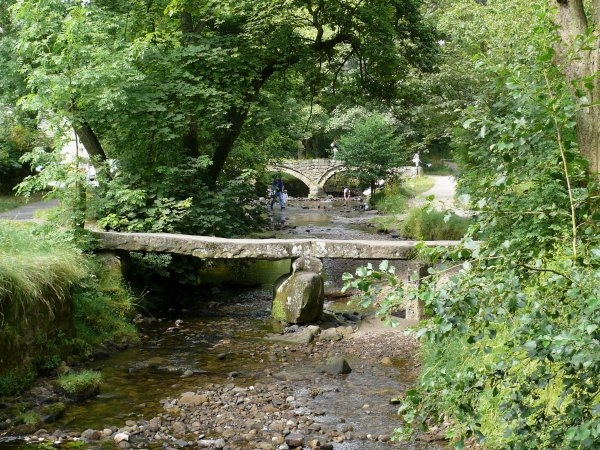
Clapper bridge at Wycoller, Pendle, East Lancashire

Some larger clapper bridges, such as at Dartmeet and Bellever, have collapsed – their slabs swept away by floods, or raided for building or wall construction - and have since been rebuilt. However, there are many other smaller examples in existence on Dartmoor and still in use, such as those at Teignhead Farm (close to Grey Wethers stone circles), Scorhill and across the Wallabrook stream.

While the term "clapper bridge" is associated with the United Kingdom, there are other "clapper-style" bridges elsewhere. One example is the over two-kilometre-long Anping Bridge in China; another is in Louisburgh, County Mayo, Ireland.
