= Minions, Cornwall =

Coordinates: 50.514°N 4.454°W

Minions: Cornish: Menyon
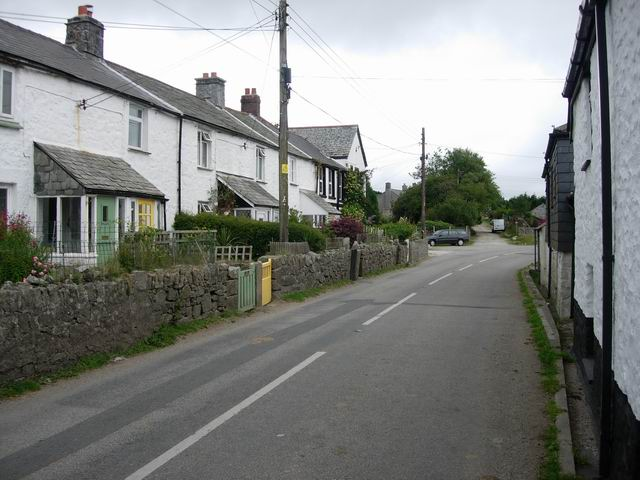
- Minions

- Location within Cornwall
- OS grid reference: SX2671
- Civil parish: Linkinhorne
- Unitary authority: Cornwall
- Ceremonial county: Cornwall
- Region: South West
- Country: England
- Sovereign state: United Kingdom
- Post town: LISKEARD
- Postcode district: PL14
- Dialling code: 01579
- Police: Devon and Cornwall
- Fire: Cornwall
- Ambulance: South Western
- UK Parliament: South East Cornwall

Minions (Cornish: Menyon) is a village in Cornwall, England, United Kingdom. It is situated on the eastern flank of Bodmin Moor northwest of Caradon Hill approximately four miles (6 km) north of Liskeard. Minions is first recorded in 1613 and its meaning is unknown.

Three stone circles, collectively known as the Hurlers, are located on the west side of the village. Several other tumuli are also in the area, including Rillaton round barrow, where a Bronze Age gold beaker was discovered. The Cheesewring, a distinctive rock formation, is a mile northwest.

The village has embraced the coincidence that its name is now shared with the Despicable Me characters.

== Geography ==
Minions is in the former Caradon administrative district and in the parish of Linkinhorne. At 300 metres (980 ft) it is said to be the highest village in Cornwall.

The village is dominated by Caradon Hill, standing at 371 metres (1,217 ft) high, on which there is a TV transmission mast on the summit. As a result, there is a road leading up to the summit from Minions. On the western flank of the hill, a quarry recently started up again, cutting granite boulders.

As well as this working quarry, there are many other disused quarries and mine buildings in the area due to the village's mining heritage, including the Phoenix United Mine that closed in 1914. As of mid-2026 there is no known exploration activity for tin or copper in the local area, unlike the situation near Callington, and further west in Cornwall near Camborne and Helston.

=== Climate ===
The climate of Minions is Oceanic but, like the rest of Bodmin Moor, due to its higher altitude, it is often cooler, windier and wetter. However, there is a good balance of fair days too, which can get warm in the summer. In winter frosts are common and even though it snows most years, it is never prolonged or severe.

== Community facilities ==
The village has two main car parks, located on the western and eastern edges of the village. Public toilets are up a track opposite the burnt-out pub. A visitor centre dedicated to the mining history of the local area was formerly located to the north of the village in a disused engine house.

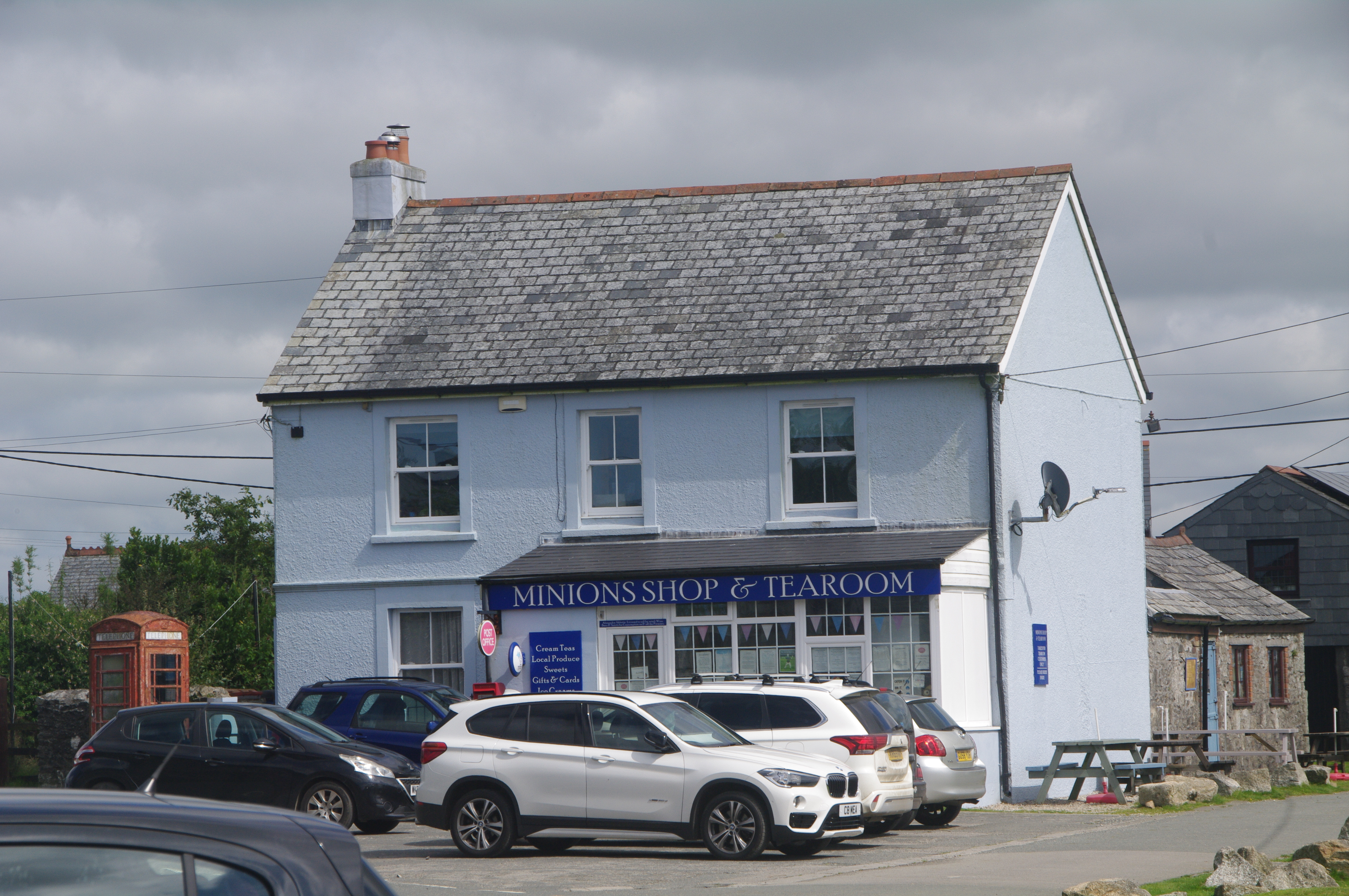
Minions Shop and Tea Room

There is a general store which also holds a post office and a tearoom.

There was a pub, The Cheesewring, that suffered a fire in December 2021 which caused substantial damage,and has not, as of July 2026, been rebuilt.

== Popular culture ==
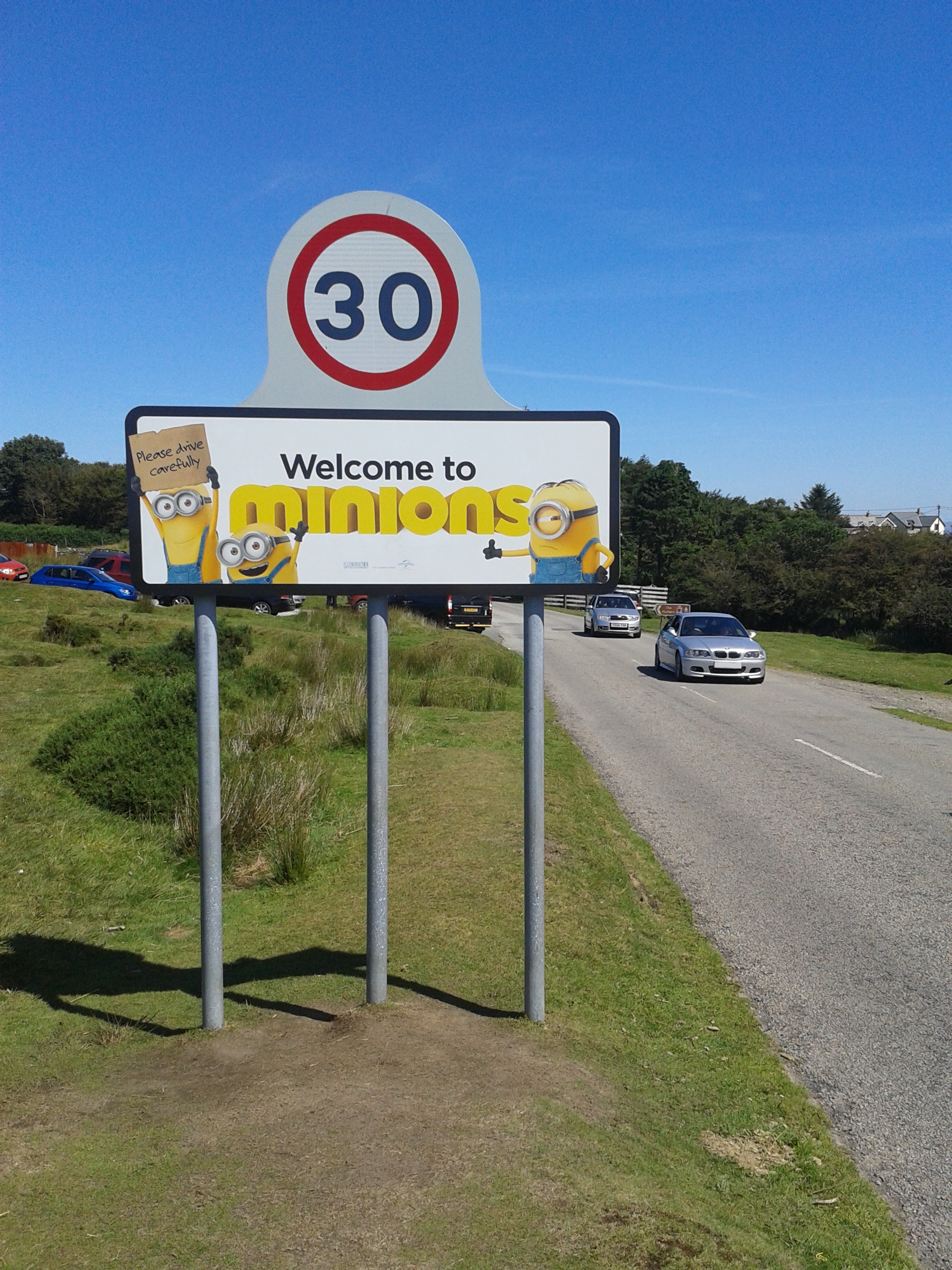
The bespoke 2015 sign

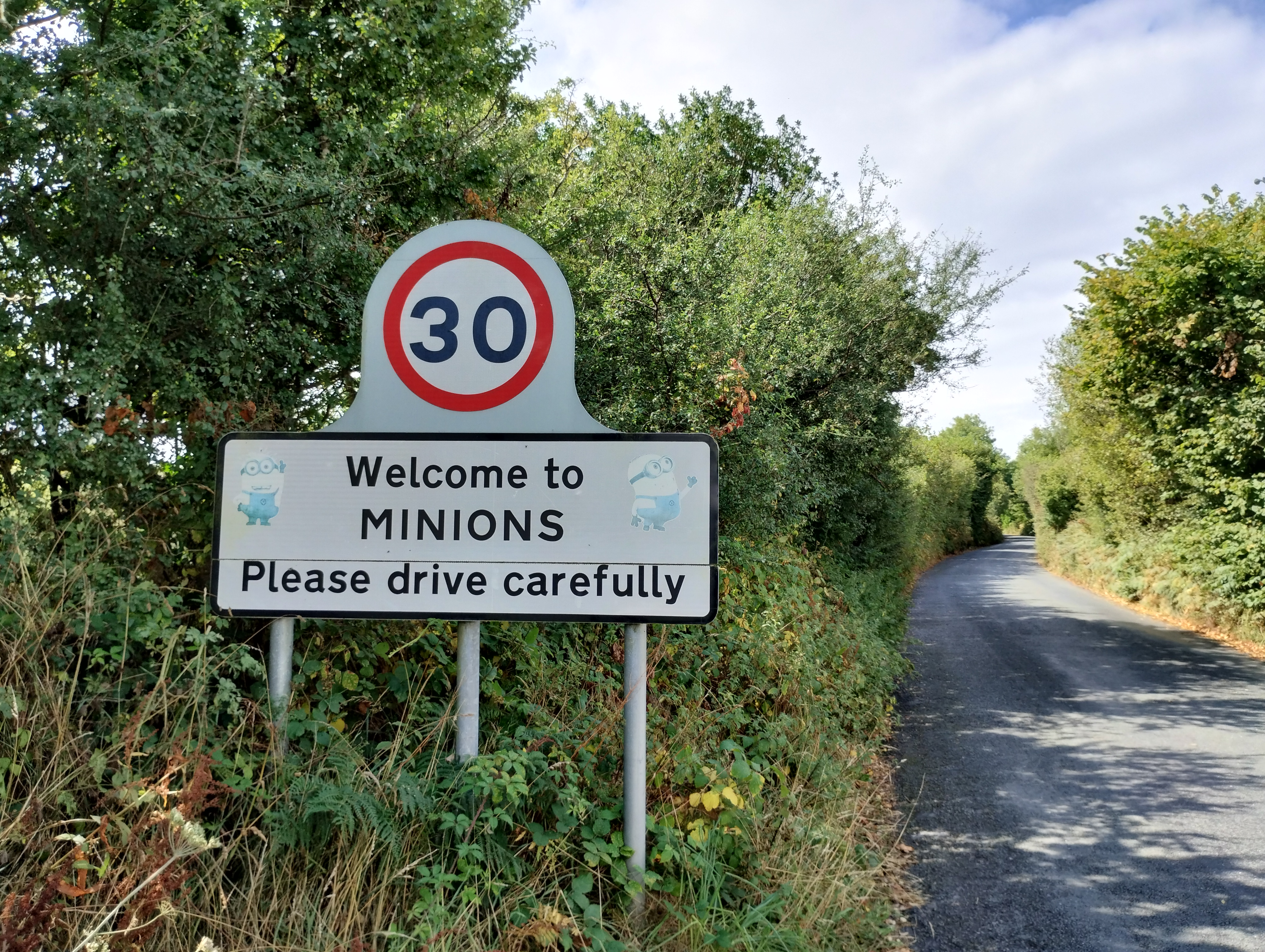
The original sign with stickers, seen in 2022

In May 2015, a custom welcome sign for the village of Minions featured images of Minions, the titular characters in the then-forthcoming Minions movie. The sign caused traffic and safety issues from vehicles stopping to take photos, and many residents of Minions felt it boosted business and "put Minions on the map". After several months it was replaced with an ordinary, Minions-free sign, but an anonymous person then decorated the plain "Welcome to Minions" sign with two stickers of Minions.

Filming for Miss Peregrine's Home for Peculiar Children took place in 2015.

A previous resident of Minions and his rather unusual bovine friend were featured in an award-winning short film "Tony & The Bull". Scrunch, a Highland bull, was found as a calf on the moor, and Tony house-trained him and lived in a former run-down pub close to Minions. Both have since died and were cremated and buried together.

== Gallery ==
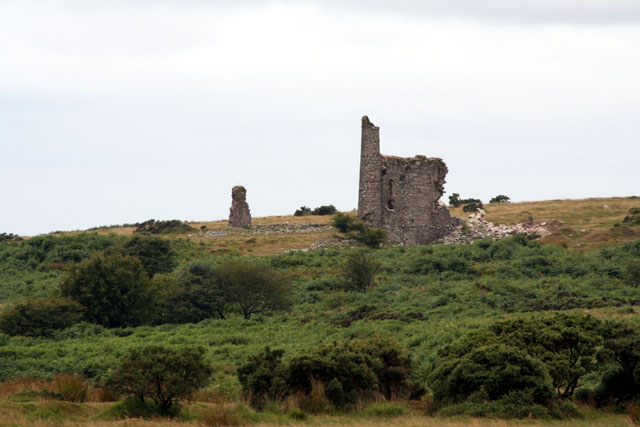
Engine house of a disused mine

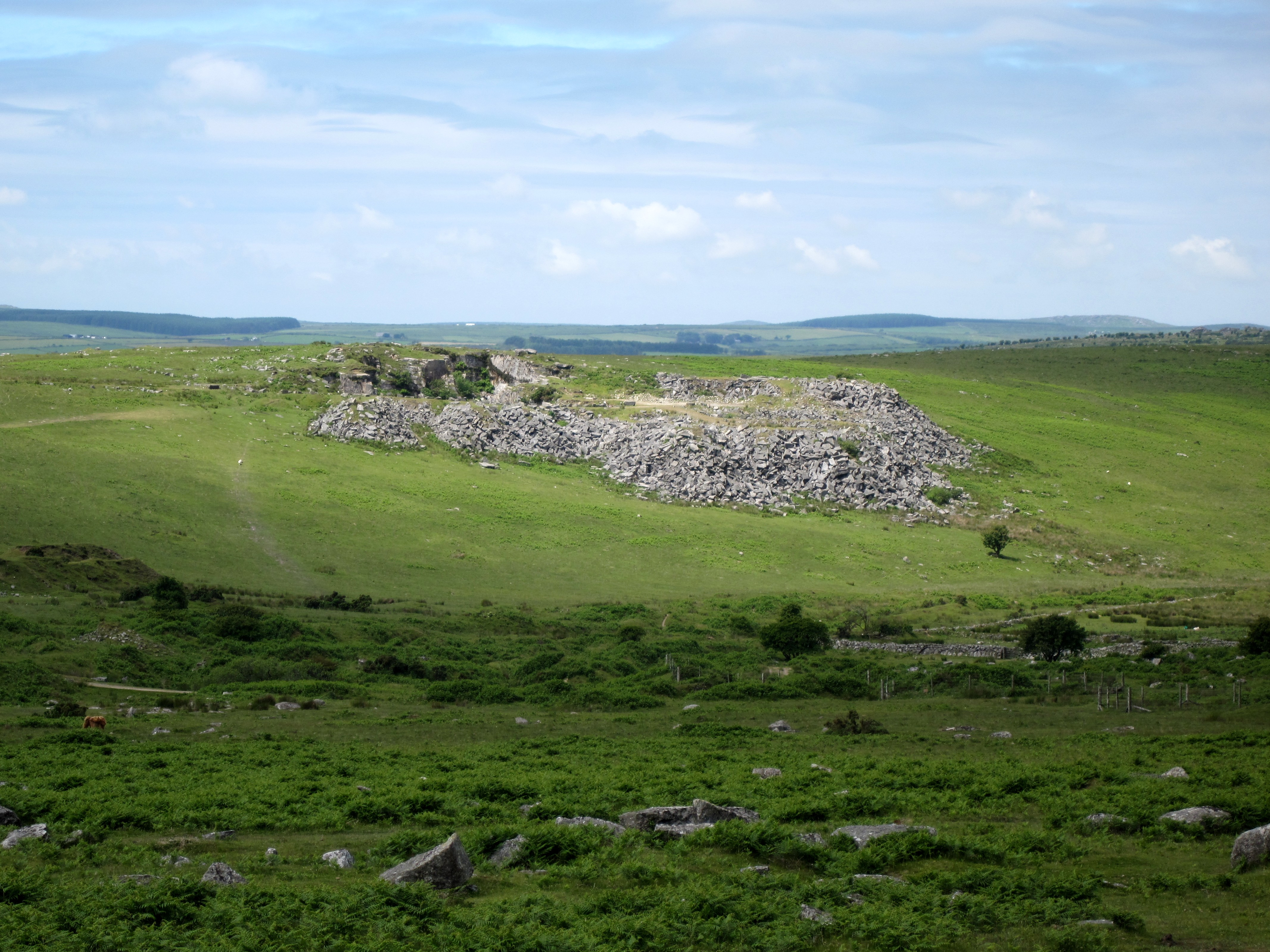
Gold Diggings, a disused granite quarry on the moor
