= Darleyford =

Hamlet in Cornwall, England

Coordinates: 50.53195°N 4.43694°W

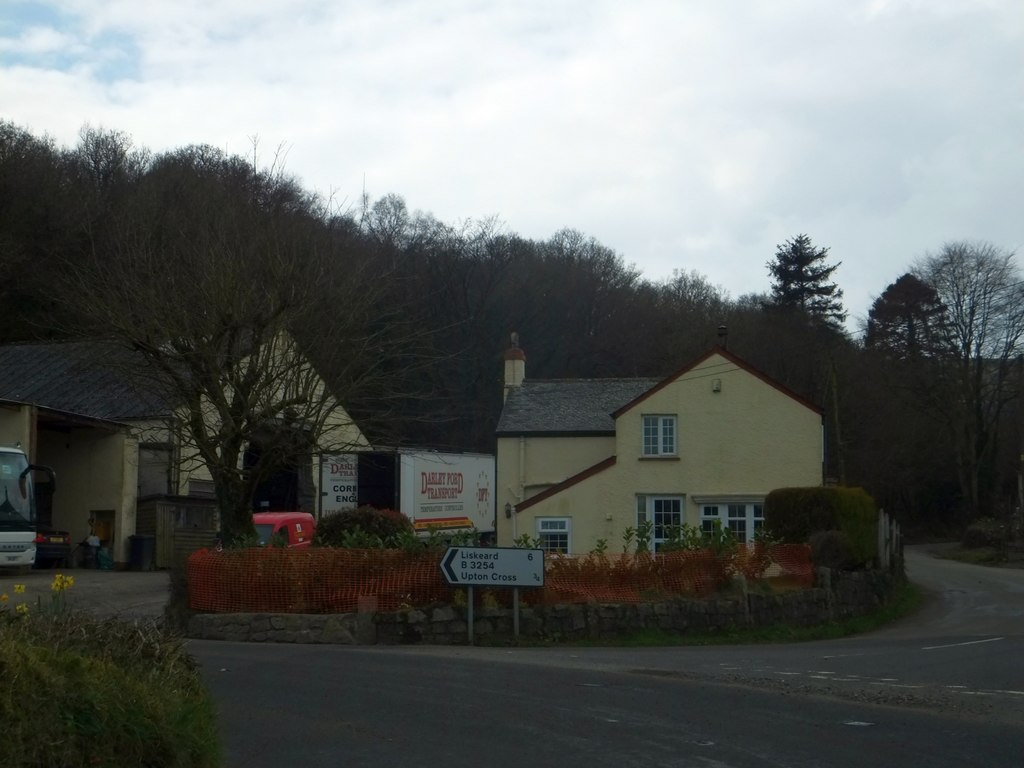
Darleyford road junction and business buildings

Darleyford (Cornish: Rys Dowr Legh, meaning ford of the rock slab river) is a hamlet in the parish of Linkinhorne in Cornwall, UK.

The Darley Oak is a notable oak tree here.
