= South Hill, Cornwall =

Hamlet in Cornwall, England

Coordinates: 50.529°N 4.358°W

South Hill: Cornish: Henle Soth
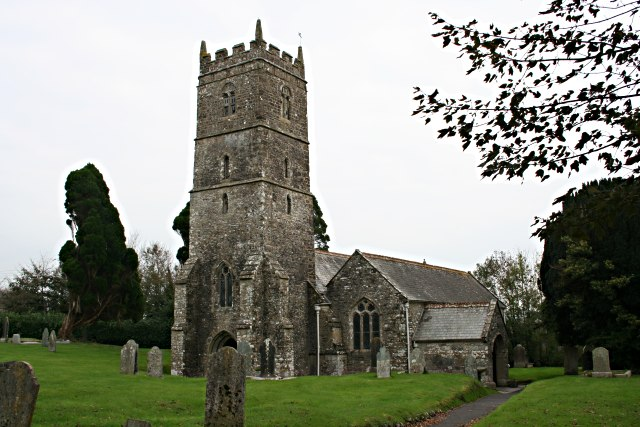
- St Sampson's church

- Location within Cornwall
- Population: 474
- OS grid reference: SX329726
- Civil parish: South Hill
- Unitary authority: Cornwall
- Ceremonial county: Cornwall
- Region: South West
- Country: England
- Sovereign state: United Kingdom
- Post town: CALLINGTON
- Postcode district: PL17
- Dialling code: 01579
- Police: Devon and Cornwall
- Fire: Cornwall
- Ambulance: South Western
- UK Parliament: South East Cornwall

South Hill (Cornish: Henle Soth) is a civil parish and hamlet in east Cornwall, England, United Kingdom. The parish population at the 2011 census was 489.

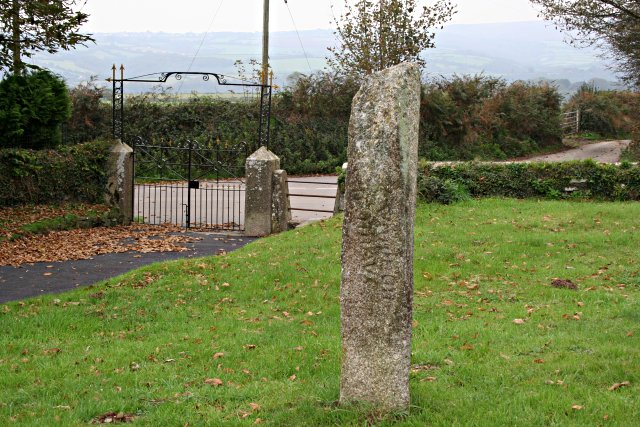
The inscribed stone in the churchyard

St Sampson's Church was consecrated in 1333 and apart from the upper stage of the tower and the south aisle is entirely of this date (the additions are 15th century). The font is Norman and a fine example of the Bodmin type (carved with four faces, trees and curious creatures); in the churchyard is an inscribed stone of the 6th or 7th century. The tower is topped by figures of the Twelve Apostles. Callington was formerly in the parish of South Hill. St Sampson's well is supposed to have been either near the church in the grounds of the former rectory, or in a nearby valley in a stream leading to the river Lynher.

== Notable people ==
- George Symons VC DCM, artillery officer
- John 'Jack' Russell was resident here as a child whilst his father, John Senior, was curate of the church
