= River Lynher =

River in east Cornwall, England

Coordinates: 50.379°N 4.264°W

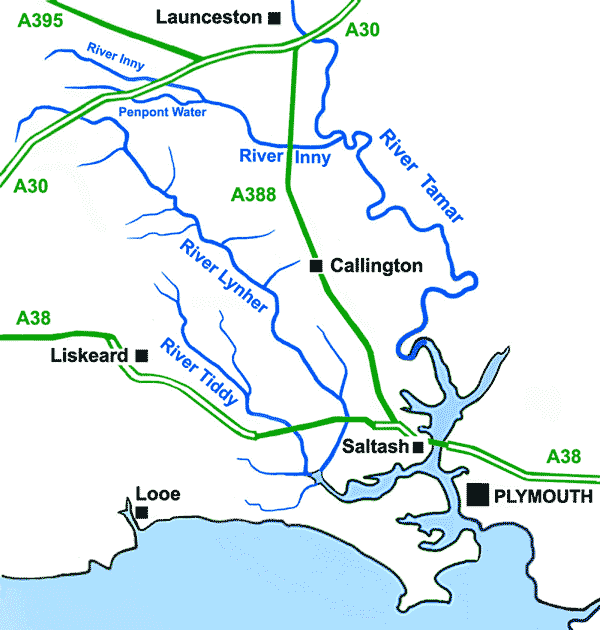
A sketchmap of the River Tamar south of Launceston showing tributaries including the River Lynher

The River Lynher (Cornish: Linar) (or St Germans River downstream from its confluence with the Tiddy) flows through east Cornwall, England, and enters the River Tamar at the Hamoaze, which in turn flows into Plymouth Sound.

== Navigation ==
The normal tidal limit is a weir upstream of Notter Bridge. St Germans is a historic fishing village situated on the River Tiddy just upstream of its confluence with the Lynher. The Quay Sailing Club is based at St Germans Quay. The Queen's Harbour Master for Plymouth is responsible for managing navigation on the tidal Lynher and its tributaries (up to the normal tidal limits).

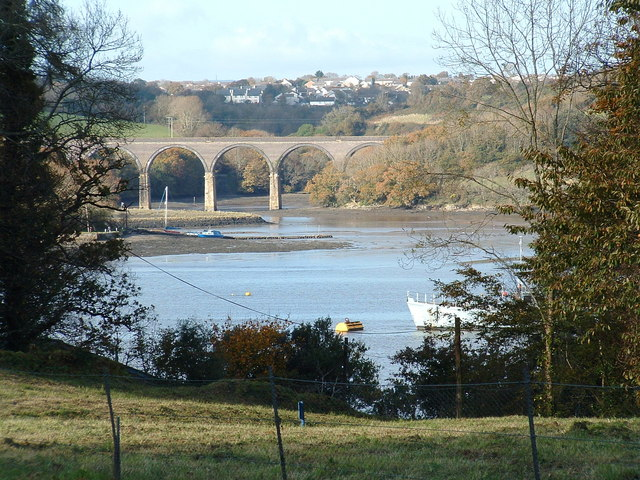
The River Lynher near Saltash, as seen from the Antony estate

== Geography ==
The river is about 21 miles (34 km) long, rising at a height of about 920 feet (280m) on Bodmin Moor and flowing into the Tamar Estuary near Plymouth. It has four main tributaries, the largest of which is the River Tiddy. The smaller tributaries include Deans Brook, Withey Brook, Marke Valley and Darleyford streams and Kelly Brook.

== Ecology ==
The Lynher and its tributaries are largely used for rod and line fishing, particularly for brown trout and Atlantic salmon.

Its estuary is a designated Site of Special Scientific Interest and also a Special Protection Area. Many species of animals can be found here, including the kingfisher, otter, white-throated dipper, avocet, and black-tailed godwit; the triangular club-rush (scirpus) also grows on the banks. The estuary, along with the Tamar–Tavy Estuary system and St John's Lake, form the Tamar Estuaries Complex Special Protection Area (SPA), as well as forming part of the Plymouth Sound and Estuaries Special Area of Conservation (SAC).

Park Wood, in the Lynher valley 2 miles (3.2 km) south-west of Callington off the A390 road, is also designated an SSSI for its biological interest.

== See also ==
- Stara Bridge
