= History of Australia (1788–1850) =

The history of Australia from 1788 to 1850 covers the early British colonial period of Australia's history. This started with the arrival in 1788 of the First Fleet of British ships at Port Jackson, and the establishment of the penal colony of New South Wales as part of the British Empire. It further covers the European scientific exploration of the continent and the establishment of the other Australian colonies that make up the modern states of Australia.

After several years of privation, the penal colony gradually expanded and developed an economy based on farming, fishing, whaling, trade with incoming ships, and construction using convict labour. By 1820, however, British settlement was largely confined to a 100-kilometre (62 mi) radius around Sydney and to the central plain of Van Diemen's land. From 1816, penal transportation to Australia increased rapidly and the number of free settlers grew steadily. Van Diemen's Land became a separate colony in 1825, and free settlements were established at the Swan River Colony in Western Australia (1829), the Province of South Australia (1836), and in the Port Phillip District (1836). The grazing of cattle and sheep expanded inland, leading to increasing conflict with Aboriginal people on their traditional lands.

The growing population of free settlers, former convicts and Australian-born currency lads and lasses led to public demands for representative government. Penal transportation to New South Wales ended in 1840 and a semi-elected Legislative Council was established in 1842. In 1850, Britain granted Van Diemen's Land, South Australia and the newly created colony of Victoria semi-representative Legislative Councils.

British settlement led to a decline in the Aboriginal population and the disruption of their cultures due to introduced diseases, violent conflict and dispossession of their traditional lands. Aboriginal resistance to British encroachment on their land often led to reprisals from settlers including massacres of Aboriginal people. Many Aboriginal people, however, sought an accommodation with the settlers and established viable communities, often on small areas of their traditional lands, where many aspects of their cultures were maintained.

== Colonisation ==
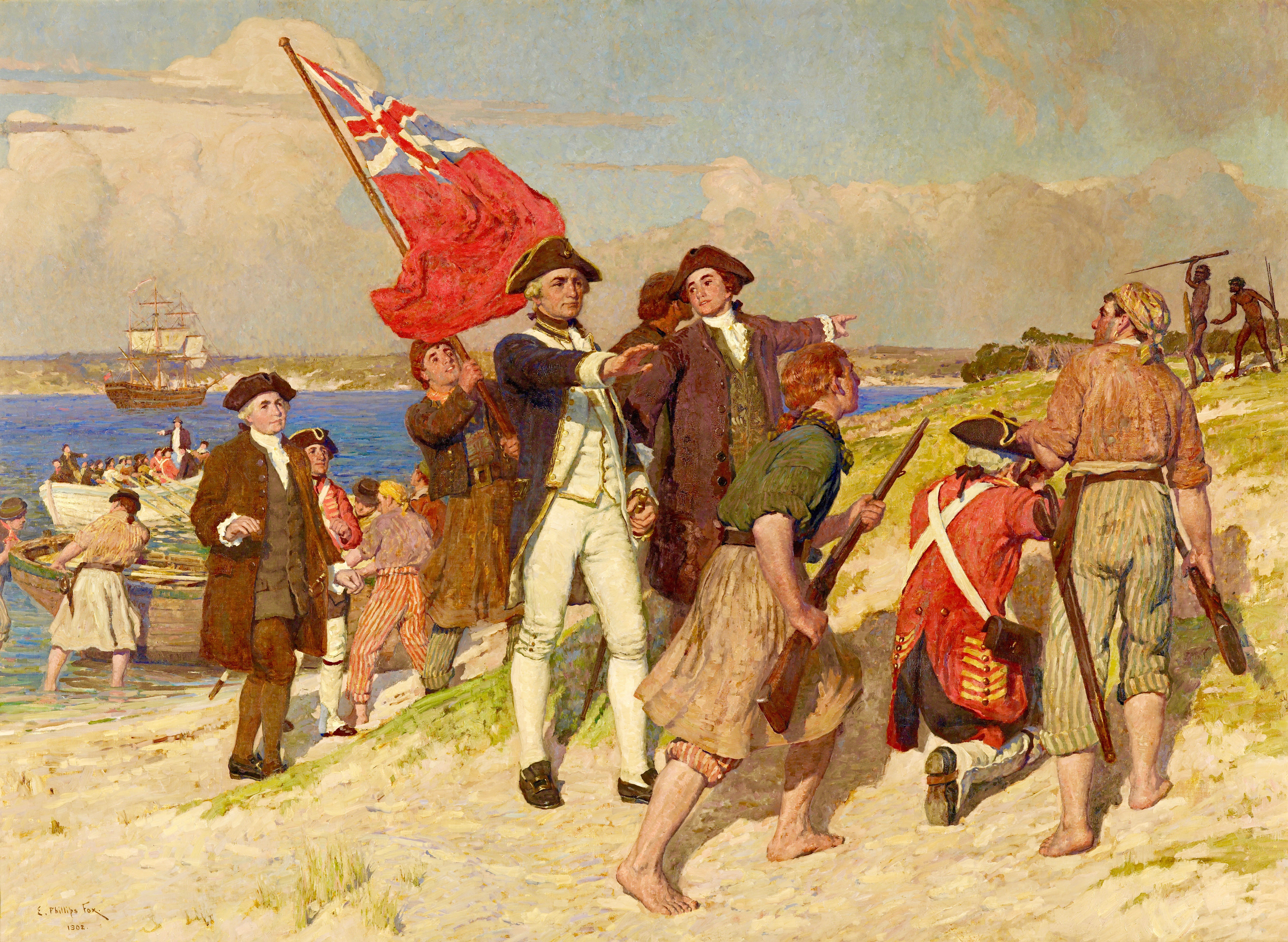
Lieutenant James Cook's landing at Botany Bay on 29 April 1770, by E. Phillips Fox

=== Decision to colonise New South Wales ===
The American Revolutionary War (1775–1783) saw Great Britain lose most of its North American colonies and consider establishing replacement territories. Britain had transported about 50,000 convicts to the New World from 1718 to 1775 and was now searching for an alternative. The temporary solution of floating prison hulks had reached capacity and was a public health hazard, while the option of building more jails and workhouses was deemed too expensive.

Sir Joseph Banks, the eminent scientist who had accompanied Lieutenant James Cook on his 1770 voyage, recommended Botany Bay, as a suitable site. Banks accepted an offer of assistance from the American Loyalist James Matra in July 1783. Matra had visited Botany Bay with Banks in 1770 as a junior officer on the Endeavour commanded by James Cook. Under Banks's guidance, he rapidly produced "A Proposal for Establishing a Settlement in New South Wales" (24 August 1783), with a fully developed set of reasons for a colony composed of American Loyalists, Chinese and South Sea Islanders (but not convicts).

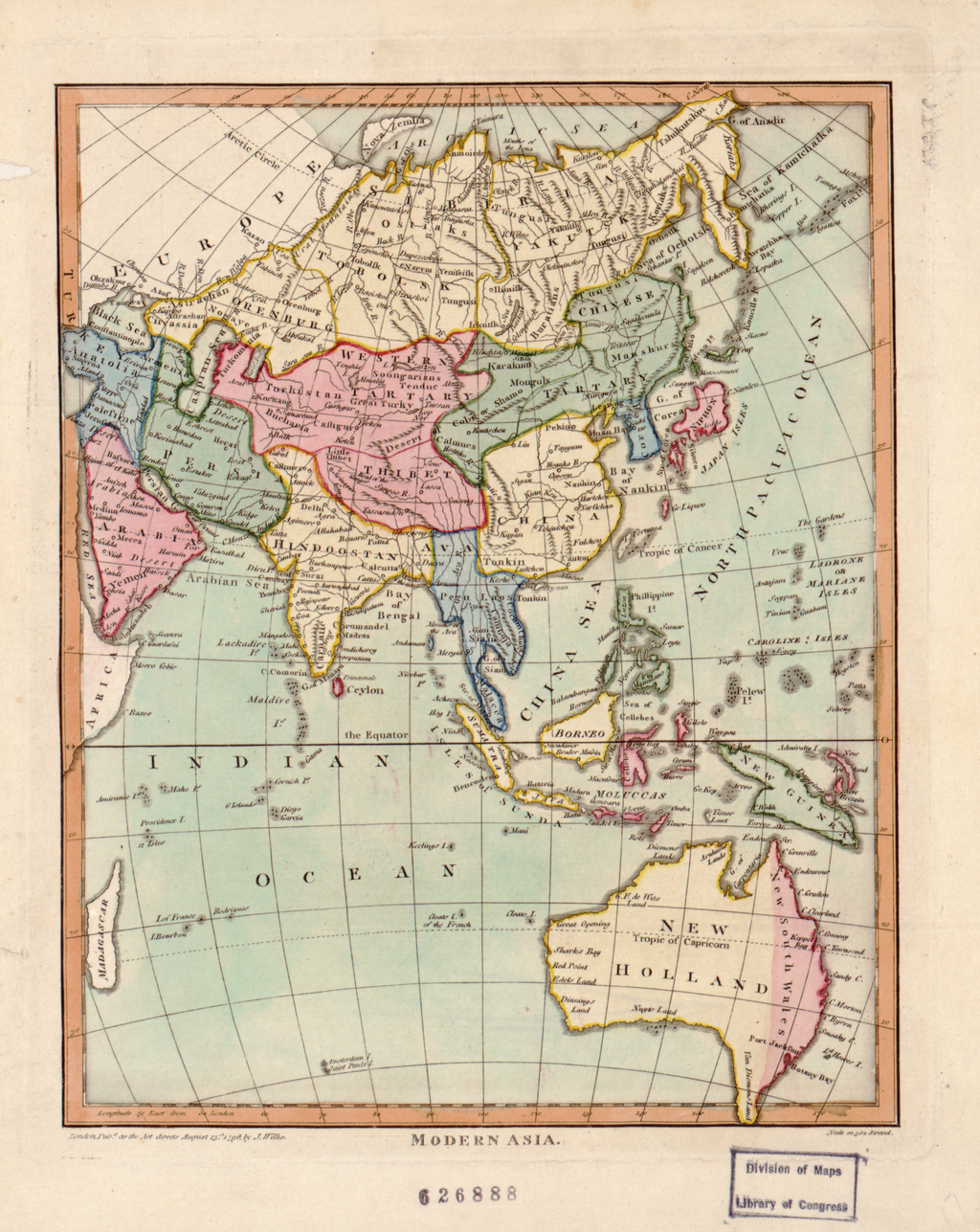
The continent of Australia (then known as New Holland) in a 1796 map, which was incorporated within Asia or the "Eastern world"

Following an interview with Secretary of State Lord Sydney in March 1784, Matra amended his proposal to include convicts as settlers. Matra's plan can be seen to have “provided the original blueprint for settlement in New South Wales”. A cabinet memorandum December 1784 shows the Government had Matra's plan in mind when considering the creation of a settlement in New South Wales.

The major alternative to Botany Bay was sending convicts to Africa. From 1775 convicts had been sent to garrison British forts in west Africa, but the experiment had proved unsuccessful. In 1783, the Pitt government considered exiling convicts to a small river island in Gambia where they could form a self-governing community, a "colony of thieves", at no expense to the government.

In 1785, a parliamentary select committee chaired by Lord Beauchamp recommended against the Gambia plan, but failed to endorse the alternative of Botany Bay. In a second report, Beauchamp recommended a penal settlement at Das Voltas Bay in modern Namibia. The plan was dropped, however, when an investigation of the site in 1786 found it to be unsuitable. Two weeks later, in August 1786, the Pitt government announced its intention to send convicts to Botany Bay. The Government incorporated the settlement of Norfolk Island into their plan, with its attractions of timber and flax, proposed by Banks's Royal Society colleagues, Sir John Call and Sir George Young.

There has been a longstanding debate over whether the key consideration in the decision to establish a penal colony at Botany Bay was the pressing need to find a solution to the penal management problem, or whether broader imperial goals — such as trade, securing new supplies of timber and flax for the navy, and the desirability of strategic ports in the region — were paramount. Leading historians in the debate have included Sir Ernest Scott, Geoffrey Blainey, and Alan Frost.

The decision to settle was taken when it seemed the outbreak of civil war in the Netherlands might precipitate a war in which Britain would be again confronted with the alliance of the three naval Powers, France, Holland and Spain, which had brought her to defeat in 1783. Under these circumstances a naval base in New South Wales which could facilitate attacks on Dutch and Spanish interests in the region would be attractive. Specific plans for using the colony as a strategic base against Spanish interests were occasionally made after 1788, but never implemented.

Macintyre argues that the evidence for a military-strategic motive in establishing the colony is largely circumstantial and hard to reconcile with the strict ban on establishing a shipyard in the colony. Karskens points out that the instructions provided to the first five governors of New South Wales show that the initial plans for the colony were limited. The settlement was to be a self-sufficient penal colony based on subsistence agriculture. Trade, shipping and ship building were banned in order to keep the convicts isolated and so as not to interfere with the trade monopoly of the British East India Company. There was no plan for economic development apart from investigating the possibility of producing raw materials for Britain. Christopher and Maxwell-Stewart argue that whatever the government's original motives were in establishing the colony, by the 1790s it had at least achieved the imperial objective of providing a harbour where vessels could be careened and resupplied.

=== Establishment of colony ===
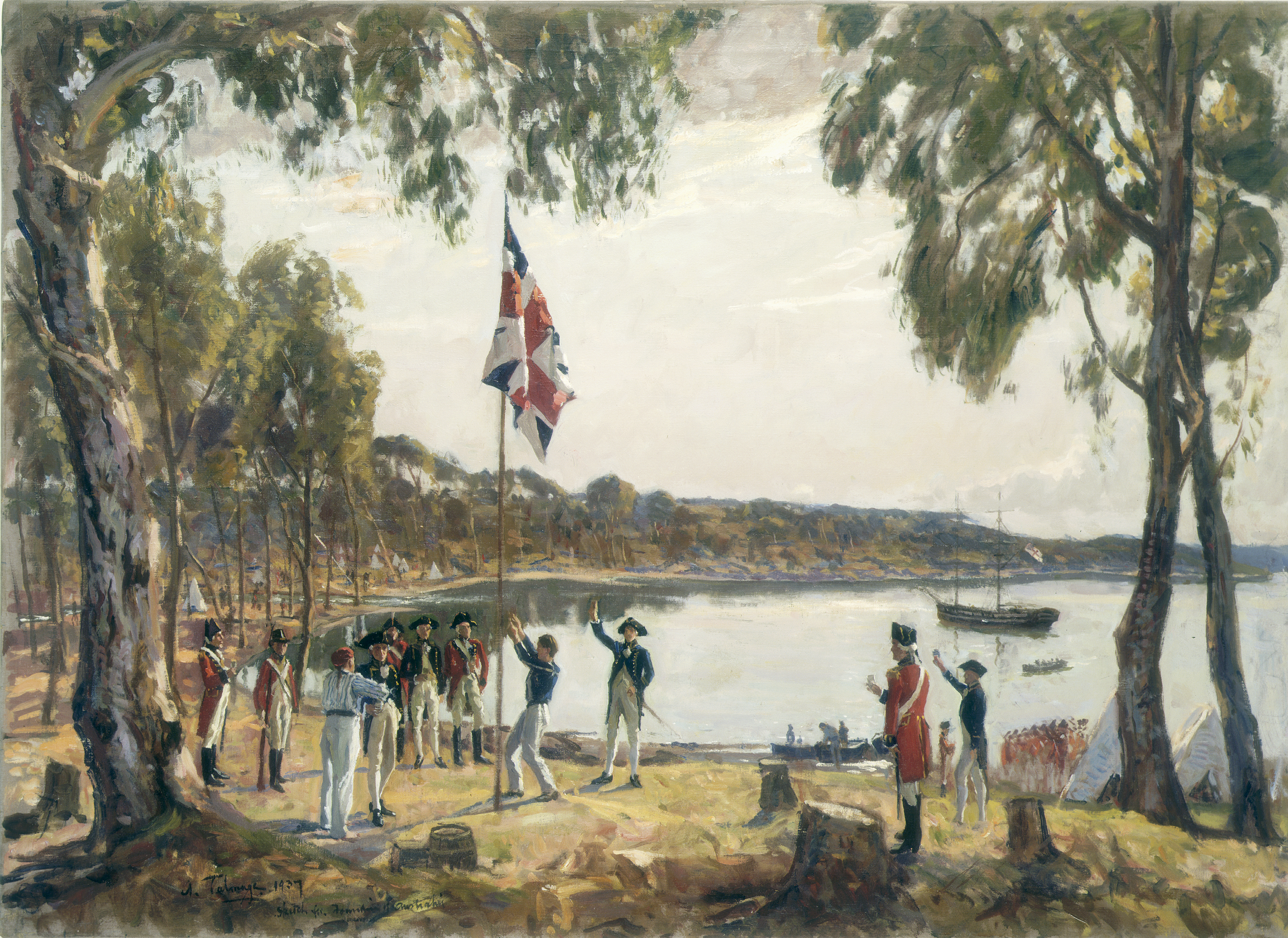
First raising of the Union Flag following the arrival of the First Fleet, and the proclamation of the Colony of New South Wales by Captain Arthur Phillip at Sydney Cove on 7 February 1788, by Algernon Talmage

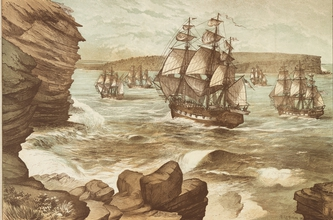
Arrival of the First Fleet in Port Jackson in 1788

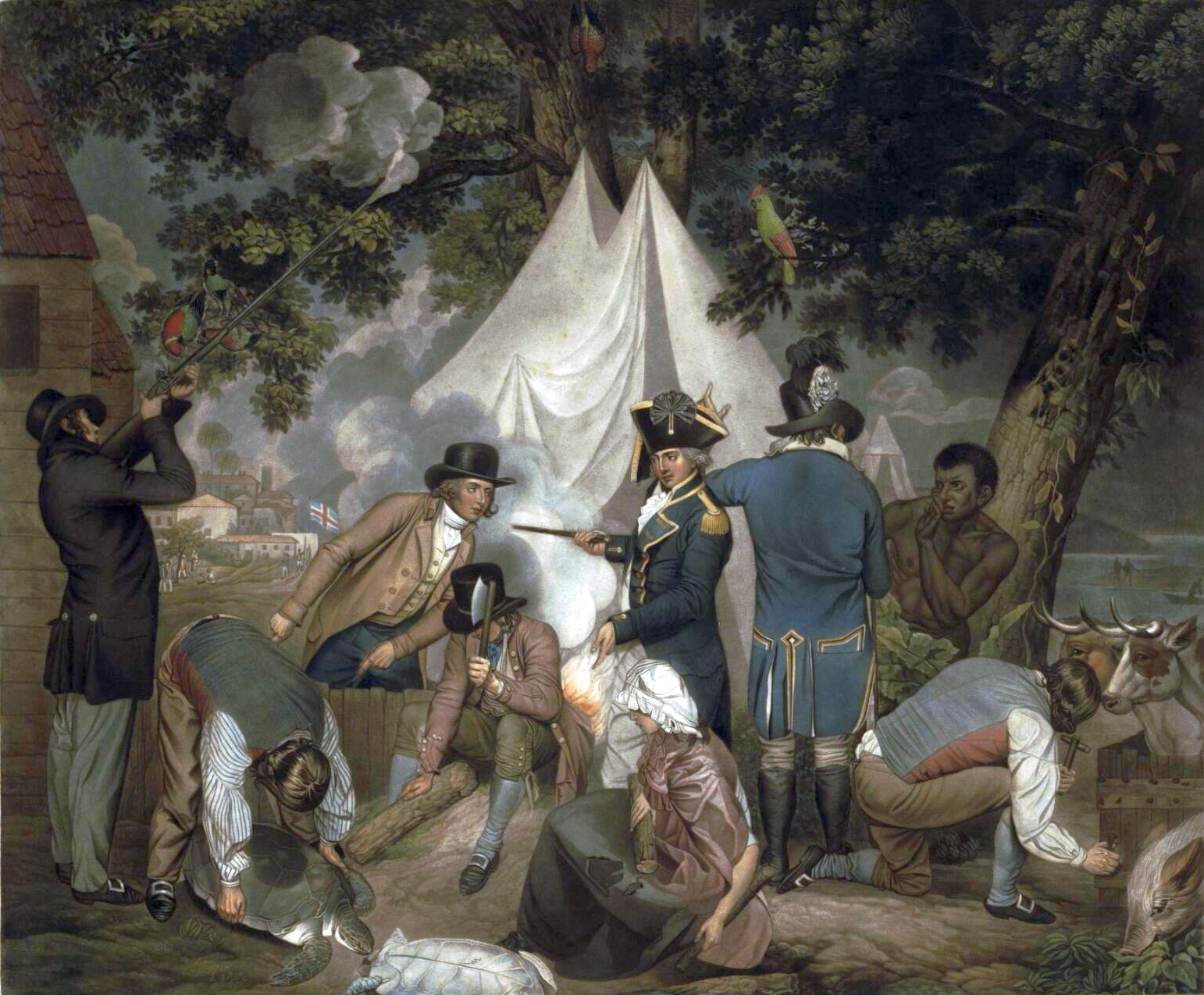
Founding of the settlement of Port Jackson at Botany Bay in 1788

On 13 May 1787, the First Fleet of 11 ships and about 1,530 people (736 convicts, 17 convicts' children, 211 marines, 27 marines' wives, 14 marines' children and about 300 officers and others) under the command of Captain Arthur Phillip set sail for Botany Bay. A few days after arrival at Botany Bay the fleet moved to the more suitable Port Jackson where a settlement was established at Sydney Cove, on 26 January 1788. This date later became Australia's national day, Australia Day. The colony was formally proclaimed by Governor Phillip on 7 February 1788 at Sydney. Sydney Cove offered a fresh water supply and a safe harbour, which Philip famously described as:

being with out exception the finest Harbour in the World [...] Here a Thousand Sail of the Line may ride in the most perfect Security.

Phillip named the settlement after the Home Secretary, Lord Sydney. The only people at the flag raising ceremony and the formal taking of possession of the land in the name of King George III were Phillip and a few dozen marines and officers from the Supply, the rest of the ship's company and the convicts witnessing it from on board ship. The remaining ships of the Fleet were unable to leave Botany Bay until later on 26 January because of a tremendous gale. The new colony was formally proclaimed as the Colony of New South Wales on 7 February.

The colony included all of Australia eastward of the meridian of 135° East. This included more than half of mainland Australia and reflected the line of division between the claims of Spain and Portugal established in the Treaty of Tordesillas in 1494. Watkin Tench subsequently commented in A Narrative of the Expedition to Botany Bay, "By this partition, it may be fairly presumed, that every source of future litigation between the Dutch and us, will be for ever cut off, as the discoveries of English navigators only are comprized in this territory".

The claim also included "all the Islands adjacent in the Pacific" between the latitudes of Cape York and the southern tip of Van Diemen's Land (Tasmania). King argues that an unofficial British map published in 1786 (A General Chart of New Holland) showed the possible extent of this claim. In 1817, the British government withdrew the extensive territorial claim over the South Pacific, passing an act specifying that Tahiti, New Zealand and other islands of the South Pacific were not within His Majesty's dominions. However, it is unclear whether the claim ever extended to the current islands of New Zealand.

On 24 January 1788 a French expedition of two ships led by Admiral Jean-François de La Pérouse had arrived off Botany Bay, on the latest leg of a three-year voyage. Though amicably received, the French expedition was a troublesome matter for the British, as it showed the interest of France in the new land.

Nevertheless, on 2 February Lieutenant King, at Phillip's request, paid a courtesy call on the French and offered them any assistance they may need. The French made the same offer to the British, as they were much better provisioned than the British and had enough supplies to last three years. Neither of these offers was accepted. On 10 March the French expedition, having taken on water and wood, left Botany Bay, never to be seen again.

Governor Phillip was vested with complete authority over the inhabitants of the colony. His intention was to establish harmonious relations with local Aboriginal people and try to reform as well as discipline the convicts of the colony. Early efforts at agriculture were fraught and supplies from overseas were scarce. Between 1788 and 1792 about 3546 male and 766 female convicts were landed at Sydney. Many new arrivals were sick or unfit for work and the condition of healthy convicts also deteriorated due to the hard labour and poor food. The food situation reached crisis point in 1790 and the Second Fleet which finally arrived in June 1790 had lost a quarter of its passengers through sickness, while the condition of the convicts of the Third Fleet appalled Phillip. From 1791, however, the more regular arrival of ships and the beginnings of trade lessened the feeling of isolation and improved supplies.

In 1788, Phillip established a subsidiary settlement on Norfolk Island in the South Pacific where he hoped to obtain timber and flax for the navy. The island, however, had no safe harbour, which led the settlement to be abandoned and the settlers evacuated to Tasmania in 1807. The island was subsequently re-established as a site for secondary transportation in 1825.

Phillip sent exploratory missions in search of better soils, fixed on the Parramatta region as a promising area for expansion, and moved many of the convicts from late 1788 to establish a small township, which became the main centre of the colony's economic life. This left Sydney Cove only as an important port and focus of social life. Poor equipment and unfamiliar soils and climate continued to hamper the expansion of farming from Farm Cove to Parramatta and Toongabbie, but a building program, assisted by convict labour, advanced steadily. Between 1788 and 1792, convicts and their gaolers made up the majority of the population; however, a free population soon began to grow, consisting of emancipated convicts, locally born children, soldiers whose military service had expired and, finally, free settlers from Britain. Governor Phillip departed the colony for England on 11 December 1792, with the new settlement having survived near starvation and immense isolation for four years.

A number of foreign commentators pointed to the strategic importance of the new colony. Spanish naval commander Alessandro Malaspina, who visited Sydney in March–April 1793 reported to his government that imperialism and trade were the real objects of the colony. Frenchman François Péron, of the Baudin expedition visited Sydney in 1802 and reported to the French Government his surprise that the Spanish had not protested at a colony strategically placed to challenge Spanish interests in the region.

King points out that supporters of the penal colony frequently compared the venture to the foundation of Rome, and that the first Great Seal of New South Wales alluded to this. Phillip, however, wrote, "I would not wish Convicts to lay the foundations of an Empire...[.]"

=== Consolidation of colony ===
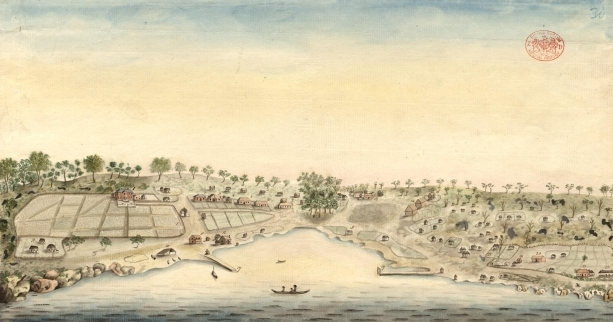
Sydney in 1792

After the departure of Phillip, trade developed with visiting ships and farming spread to more fertile lands on the fringes of Sydney. The New South Wales Corps was formed in England in 1789 as a permanent regiment of the British Army to relieve the marines who had accompanied the First Fleet. Officers of the Corps soon became involved in the corrupt and lucrative rum trade in the colony. Governor William Bligh (1806 – 1808) tried to suppress the rum trade and the illegal use of Crown Land, resulting in the Rum Rebellion of 1808. The Corps, working closely with the newly established wool trader John Macarthur, staged the only successful armed takeover of government in Australian history, deposing Bligh and instigating a brief period of military rule prior to the arrival from Britain of Governor Lachlan Macquarie in 1810.

Macquarie served as the last autocratic Governor of New South Wales, from 1810 to 1821, and had a leading role in the social and economic development of New South Wales, which saw it transition from a penal colony to a budding civil society. He established a bank, a currency and a hospital, and commissioned extensive public works.

Central to Macquarie's policy was his treatment of the emancipists, whom he considered should be treated as social equals to free-settlers in the colony. He appointed emancipists to key government positions including Francis Greenway as colonial architect and William Redfern as a magistrate. His policy on emancipists was opposed by many influential free settlers, officers and officials, and London became concerned at the cost of his public works. In 1819, London appointed J. T. Bigge to conduct an inquiry into the colony, and Macquarie resigned shortly before the report of the inquiry was published.

=== Expansion (1821—1850) ===
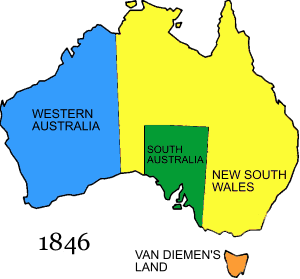
Australian colonies in 1846

In 1820, British settlement was largely confined to a 100 kilometre radius around Sydney and to the central plain of Van Diemen's Land. The settler population was 26,000 on the mainland and 6,000 in Van Diemen's Land. Following the end of the Napoleonic Wars in 1815 the transportation of convicts increased rapidly and the number of free settlers grew steadily. From 1821 to 1840, 55,000 convicts arrived in New South Wales and 60,000 in Van Diemen's Land. However, by 1830, free settlers and the locally born exceeded the convict population of New South Wales.

From the 1820s, grazing of sheep and cattle expanded rapidly, and the colony spread beyond the official bounds of settlement. In 1825, the western boundary of New South Wales was extended to longitude 129° East, which is the current boundary of Western Australia. As a result, the territory of New South Wales reached its greatest extent, covering the area of the modern state as well as modern Queensland, Victoria, Tasmania, South Australia and the Northern Territory.

The Proclamation of Governor Bourke, (10 October 1835) reinforced the doctrine that Australia had been terra nullius when settled by the British in 1788, and that the Crown had obtained beneficial ownership of all the land of New South Wales from that date. The proclamation stated that British subjects could not obtain title over vacant Crown land directly from Aboriginal Australians, effectively quashing the treaty between John Batman and the Aboriginal people of the Port Phillip area.

By 1850 the settler population of New South Wales had grown to 180,000, not including the 70–75 thousand living in the area which became the separate colony of Victoria in 1851.

=== Establishment of further colonies ===
==== Van Diemen's Land ====
After hosting Nicholas Baudin's French naval expedition in Sydney in 1802, Governor Phillip Gidley King decided to establish a settlement in Van Diemen's Land (modern Tasmania) in 1803, partly to forestall a possible French settlement. The British settlement of the island soon centred on Launceston in the north and Hobart in the south. For the first two decades the settlement relied heavily on convict labour, small-scale farming and sheep grazing, sealing, whaling and the "dog and kangaroo" economy where emancipists and escaped convicts hunted native game with guns and dogs.

From the 1820s free settlers were encouraged by the offer of land grants in proportion to the capital the settlers would bring. Almost 2 million acres of land was granted to free settlers in the decade, and the number of sheep in the island increased from 170,000 to a million. The land grants created a social division between large landowners and a majority of landless convicts and emancipists.

Van Diemen's Land became a separate colony from New South Wales in December 1825 and continued to expand through the 1830s, supported by farming, sheep grazing and whaling. Following the suspension of convict transportation to New South Wales in 1840, Van Diemen's land became the main destination for convicts. Transportation to Van Diemen's Land ended in 1853 and in 1856 the colony officially changed its name to Tasmania.

==== Victoria ====
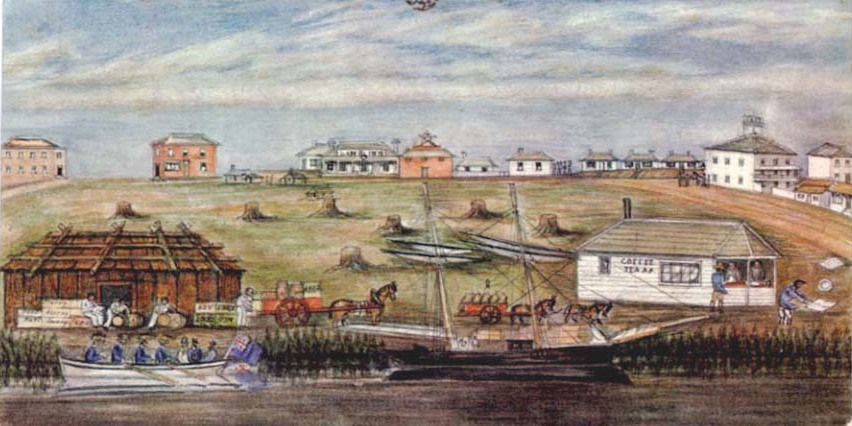
Melbourne Landing, 1840; watercolour by W. Liardet (1840)

Pastoralists from Van Diemen's land began squatting in the Port Phillip hinterland on the mainland in 1834, attracted by its rich grasslands. In 1835, John Batman and others negotiated the transfer of 100,000 acres of land from the Kulin people. However, the treaty was annulled the same year when the British Colonial Office issued the Proclamation of Governor Bourke stating that all unalienated land in the colony was vacant Crown Land, irrespective of whether it was occupied by traditional landowners. Its publication meant that from then, all people found occupying land without the authority of the government would be considered illegal trespassers.

In 1836, Port Phillip was officially recognised as a district of New South Wales and opened for settlement. The main settlement of Melbourne was established in 1837 as a planned town on the instructions of Governor Bourke. Squatters and settlers from Van Diemen's Land and New South Wales soon arrived in large numbers, and by 1850 the district had a population of 75,000 Europeans, 2,000 Indigenous inhabitants and 5 million sheep. In 1851, the Port Phillip District separated from New South Wales as the colony of Victoria.

==== Western Australia ====
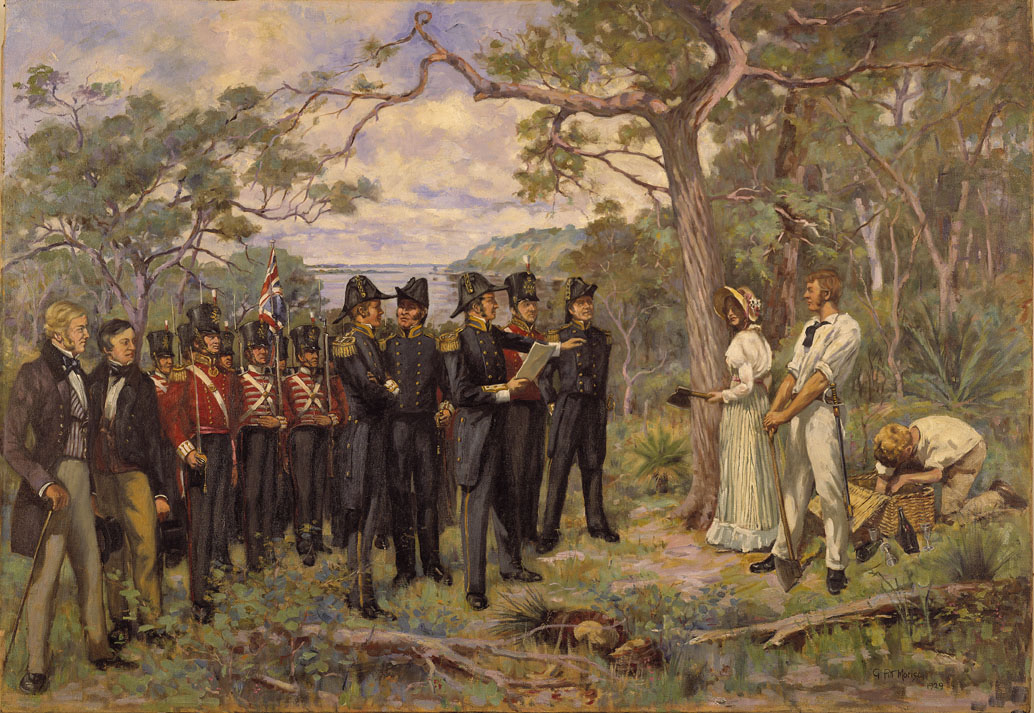
The Foundation of Perth 1829 by George Pitt Morison

In 1826, the governor of New South Wales, Ralph Darling, sent a military garrison to King George Sound (the basis of the later town of Albany), to deter the French from establishing a settlement in Western Australia. In 1827, the head of the expedition, Major Edmund Lockyer, formally annexed the western third of the continent as a British colony.

In 1829, the Swan River colony was established at the sites of modern Fremantle and Perth, becoming the first convict-free and privatised colony in Australia. However, much of the arable land was allocated to absentee owners and the development of the colony was hampered by poor soil, the dry climate, and a lack of capital and labour. By 1850 there were a little more than 5,000 settlers, half of them children. The colony accepted convicts from that year because of the acute shortage of labour.

==== South Australia ====
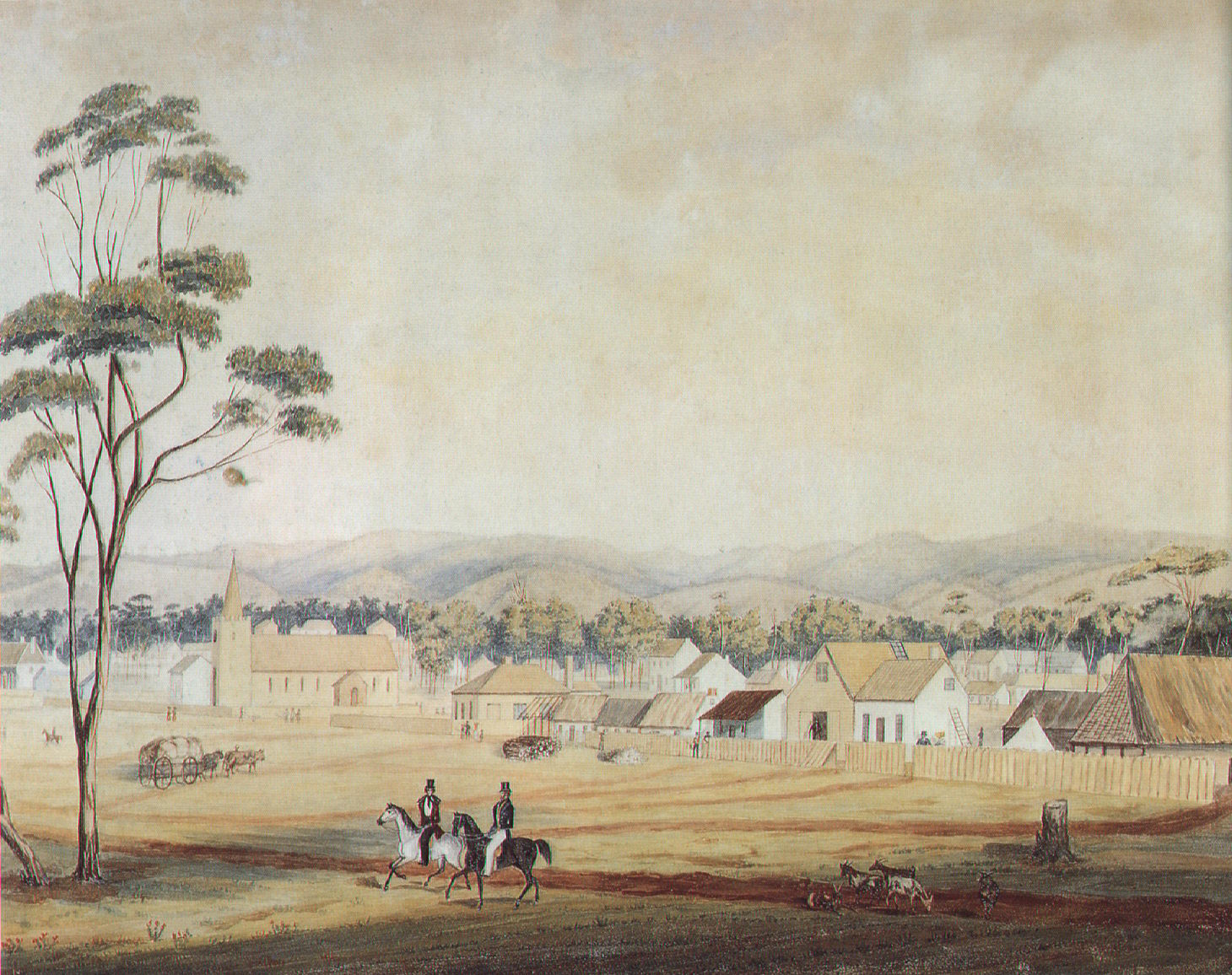
Adelaide in 1839. South Australia was founded as a free-colony, without convicts.

The Province of South Australia was established in 1836 as a privately financed settlement based on the theory of "systematic colonisation" developed by Edward Gibbon Wakefield. The intention was to found a free colony based on private investment at little cost to the British government. Power was divided between the Crown and a Board of Commissioners of Colonisation, responsible to about 300 shareholders. Settlement was to be controlled to promote a balance between land, capital and labour. Convict labour was banned in the hope of making the colony more attractive to "respectable" families and promote an even balance between male and female settlers. The city of Adelaide was to be planned with a generous provision of churches, parks and schools. Land was to be sold at a uniform price and the proceeds used to secure an adequate supply of labour through selective assisted migration. Various religious, personal and commercial freedoms were guaranteed, and the Letters Patent enabling the South Australia Act 1834 included a guarantee of the rights of "any Aboriginal Natives" and their descendants to lands they "now actually occupied or enjoyed".

The colony was badly hit by the depression of 1841–44, and overproduction of wheat and overinvestment in infrastructure almost bankrupted it. Conflict with Indigenous traditional landowners also reduced the protections they had been promised. In 1842, the settlement became a Crown colony administered by the governor and an appointed Legislative Council. The economy recovered from 1845, supported by wheat farming, sheep grazing and a boom in copper mining. By 1850 the settler population had grown to 60,000 and the following year the colony achieved limited self-government with a partially elected Legislative Council.

==== Queensland ====
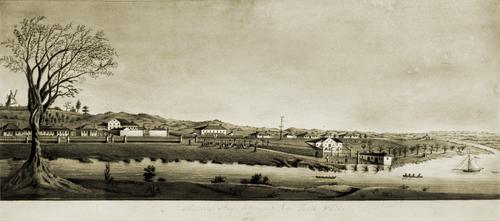
Brisbane (Moreton Bay Settlement), 1835; watercolour by H. Bowerman

In 1824, the Moreton Bay penal settlement was established on the site of present-day Brisbane as a place of secondary punishment. In 1842, the penal colony was closed and the area was opened for free settlement. By 1850 the population of Brisbane had reached 8,000 and increasing numbers of pastoralists were grazing cattle and sheep in the Darling Downs west of the town. However, several attempts to establish settlements north of the Tropic of Capricorn had failed, and the settler population in the north remained small. Frontier violence between settlers and the Indigenous population became severe as pastoralism expanded north of the Tweed River. A series of disputes between northern pastoralists and the government in Sydney led to increasing demands from the northern settlers for separation from New South Wales. In 1857, the British government agreed to the separation and in 1859 the colony of Queensland was proclaimed. The settler population of the new colony was 25,000 and the vast majority of its territory was still occupied by its traditional owners.

=== Convict society ===
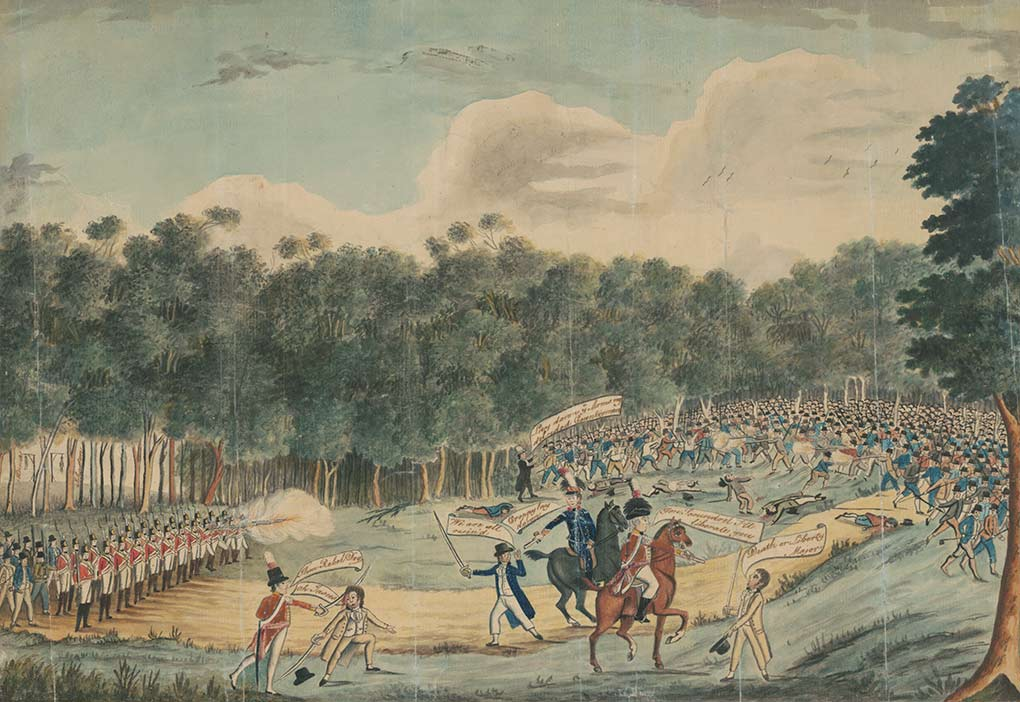
The Castle Hill convict rebellion of 1804

Between 1788 and 1868, approximately 161,700 convicts (of whom 25,000 were women) were transported to the Australian colonies of New South Wales, Van Diemen's Land and Western Australia. Historian Lloyd Robson has estimated that perhaps two-thirds were thieves from working class towns, particularly from the Midlands and north of England. The majority were repeat offenders. The literacy rate of convicts was above average and they brought a range of useful skills to the new colony including building, farming, sailing, fishing and hunting. The small number of free settlers meant that early governors also had to rely on convicts and emancipists for professions such as lawyers, architects, surveyors and teachers.

The first governors saw New South Wales as a place of punishment and reform of convicts. Convicts worked on government farms and public works such as land clearing and building. After 1792 the majority were assigned to work for private employers including emancipists (as transported convicts who had completed their sentence or had been pardoned called themselves). Emancipists were granted small plots of land for farming and a year of government rations. Later they were assigned convict labour to help them work their farms. Some convicts were assigned to military officers to run their businesses because the officers did not want to be directly associated with trade. These convicts learnt commercial skills which could help them work for themselves when their sentence ended or they were granted a "ticket of leave" (a form of parole). Female convicts were usually assigned as domestic servants to the free settlers, many being forced into prostitution.

Convicts soon established a system of piece work which allowed them to work for wages once their allocated tasks were completed. Due to the shortage of labour, wage rates before 1815 were high for male workers although much lower for females engaged in domestic work. In 1814, Governor Macquarie ordered that convicts had to work until 3pm, after which private employers had to pay them wages for any additional work.

By 1821 convicts, emancipists and their children owned two-thirds of the land under cultivation, half the cattle and one-third of the sheep. They also worked in trades and small business. Emancipists employed about half of the convicts assigned to private masters.

After 1815 wages and employment opportunities for convicts and emancipists deteriorated as a sharp increase in the number of convicts transported led to an oversupply of labour. A series of reforms recommended by J. T. Bigge in 1822 and 1823 also sought to change the nature of the colony and make transportation "an object of real terror". The food ration for convicts was cut and their opportunities to work for wages restricted. More convicts were assigned to rural work gangs, bureaucratic control and surveillance of convicts was made more systematic, isolated penal settlements were established as places of secondary punishment, the rules for tickets of leave were tightened, and land grants were skewed to favour free settlers with large capital. As a result, convicts who arrived after 1820 were far less likely to become property owners, to marry, and to establish families.

=== Growth of free settlement ===
The Bigge reforms also aimed to encourage affluent free settlers by offering them land grants for farming and grazing in proportion to their capital. From 1831 the colonies replaced land grants with land sales by auction at a fixed minimum price per acre, the proceeds being used to fund the assisted migration of workers. From 1821 to 1850 Australia attracted 200,000 immigrants from the United Kingdom. Although most immigrants settled in towns, many were attracted to the high wages and business opportunities available in rural areas. However, the system of land grants, and later land sales, led to the concentration of land in the hands of a small number of affluent settlers.

Two-thirds of the migrants to Australia during this period received assistance from the British or colonial governments. Healthy young workers without dependants were favoured for assisted migration, especially those with experience as agricultural labourers or domestic workers. Families of convicts were also offered free passage and about 3,500 migrants were selected under the English Poor Laws. Various special-purpose and charitable schemes, such as those of Caroline Chisholm and John Dunmore Lang, also provided migration assistance.

=== Women ===
Colonial Australia was characterised by an imbalance of the sexes as women comprised only about 15 per cent of convicts transported. The first female convicts brought a range of skills including experience as domestic workers, dairy women and farm workers. Due to the shortage of women in the colony they were more likely to marry than men and tended to choose older, skilled men with property as husbands. The early colonial courts enforced the property rights of women independently of their husbands, and the ration system also gave women and their children some protection from abandonment. Women were active in business and agriculture from the early years of the colony, among the most successful being the former convict turned entrepreneur Mary Reibey and the agriculturalist Elizabeth Macarthur. One-third of the shareholders of the first colonial bank (founded in 1817) were women.

One of the goals of the assisted migration programs from the 1830s was to promote migration of women and families to provide a more even gender balance in the colonies. The philanthropist Caroline Chisholm established a shelter and labour exchange for migrant women in New South Wales in the 1840s and promoted the settlement of single and married women in rural areas where she hoped they would have a civilising influence on rough colonial manners and act as "God's police".

Between 1830 and 1850 the female proportion of the Australian settler population increased from 24 per cent to 41 per cent.

== European exploration ==
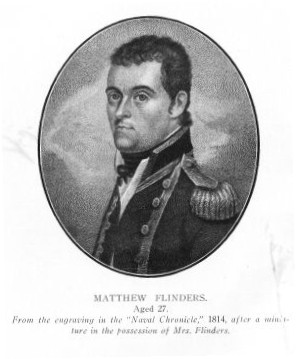
Matthew Flinders led the first successful circumnavigation of Australia in 1801–2.

By the middle of the 17th century, the discoveries of Dutch explorers allowed the almost complete mapping of Australia's northern and western coasts and much of its southern and south-eastern Tasmanian coasts. In 1770, James Cook had charted most of the east coast of the continent.

In 1798–99 George Bass and Matthew Flinders set out from Sydney in a sloop and circumnavigated Tasmania, thus proving it to be an island. In 1801–02 Flinders, in HMS Investigator, led the first circumnavigation of Australia. Aboard ship was the Aboriginal explorer Bungaree, who became the first person born on the Australian continent to circumnavigate it.

In 1798, the former convict John Wilson and two companions crossed the Blue Mountains, west of Sydney, in an expedition ordered by Governor Hunter. Hunter suppressed news of the feat for fear that it would encourage convicts to abscond from the settlement. In 1813, Gregory Blaxland, William Lawson and William Wentworth crossed the mountains by a different route and a road was soon built to the Central Tablelands.

In 1824 the Governor Sir Thomas Brisbane, commissioned Hamilton Hume and former Royal Navy Captain William Hovell to lead an expedition to find new grazing land in the south of the colony, and also to find an answer to the mystery of where New South Wales's western rivers flowed. Over 16 weeks in 1824–25, Hume and Hovell journeyed to the bay Naarm on the land of the Kulin nation, later named Port Phillip, and back. They found many important sites including the Murray River (which they named the Hume), many of its tributaries, and good agricultural and grazing lands between Gunning, New South Wales and Corio Bay, Victoria.

Charles Sturt led an expedition along the Macquarie River in 1828 and found the Darling River. A theory had developed that the inland rivers of New South Wales were draining into an inland sea. Leading a second expedition in 1829, Sturt followed the Murrumbidgee River into a 'broad and noble river', the Murray River, which he named after Sir George Murray, secretary of state for the colonies. His party then followed this river to its junction with the Darling River, facing two threatening encounters with local Aboriginal people along the way. Sturt continued downriver on to Lake Alexandrina, where the Murray meets the sea in South Australia. Suffering greatly, the party had to then row back upstream hundreds of kilometres for the return journey.

Surveyor General Sir Thomas Mitchell conducted a series of expeditions from the 1830s to "fill in the gaps" left by these previous expeditions. He was meticulous in seeking to record the original Aboriginal place names around the colony, for which reason the majority of place names to this day retain their Aboriginal titles.

The Polish scientist and explorer Count Paul Edmund Strzelecki conducted surveying work in the Australian Alps in 1839 and became the first European to ascend Australia's highest peak which he named Mount Kosciuszko in honour of the Polish patriot Tadeusz Kosciuszko.

European explorers penetrated deeper into the interior in the 1840s in a quest to discover new lands for agriculture or answer scientific enquiries. The German scientist Ludwig Leichhardt led three expeditions in northern Australia in this decade, sometimes with the help of Aboriginal guides, identifying the grazing potential of the region and making important discoveries in the fields of botany and geology. He and his party disappeared in 1848 while attempting to cross the continent from east to west. Edmund Kennedy led an expedition into what is now far-western Queensland in 1847 before being speared by Aborigines in the Cape York Peninsula in 1848.

== Aboriginal resistance and accommodation ==
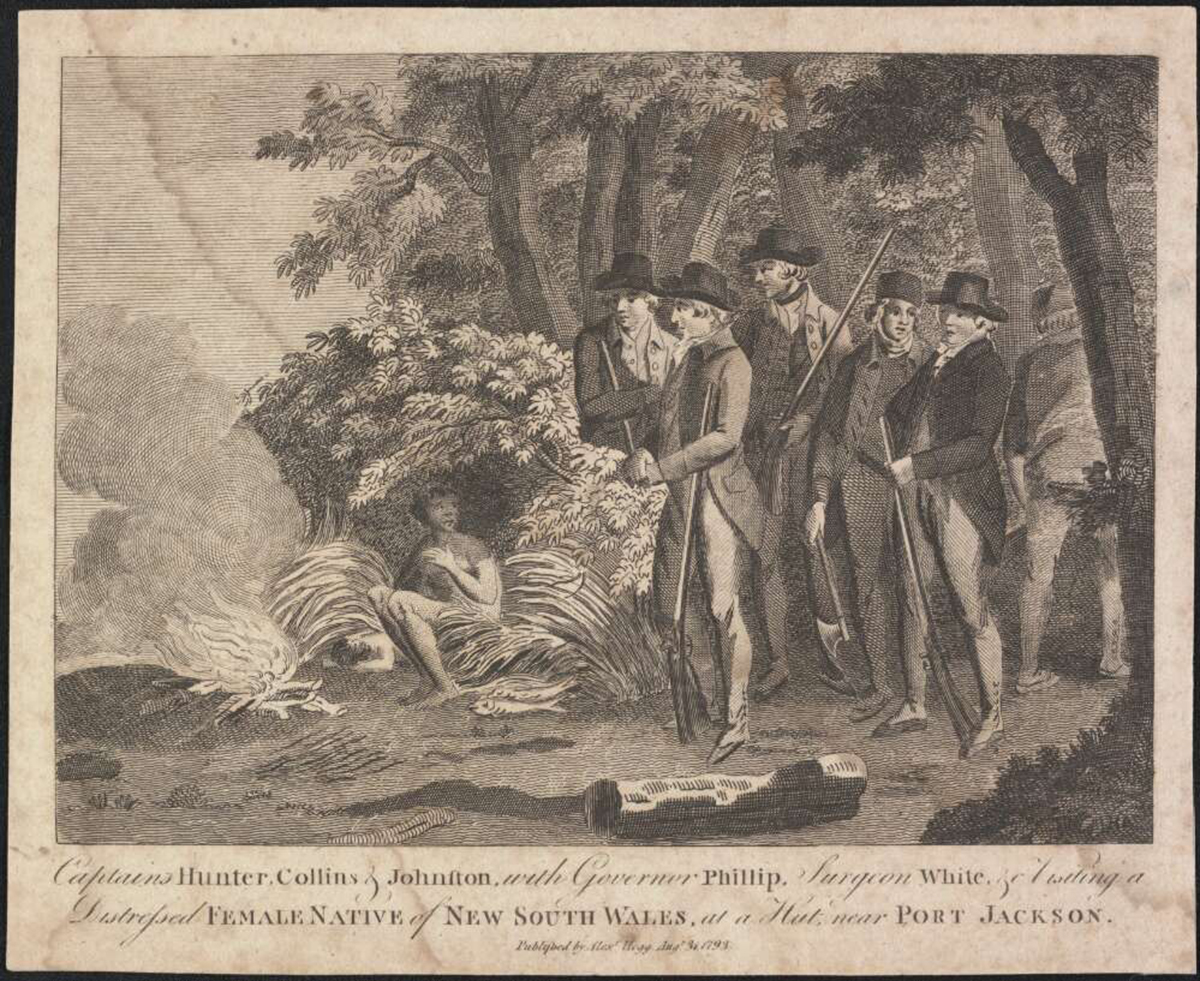
Captains Hunter, Collins and Johnston with Governor Phillip and Surgeon White visiting a distressed Aboriginal woman at a hut near Port Jackson, 1793

=== Impact of introduced diseases ===
The relative isolation of the Indigenous population for some 60,000 years meant that they had little resistance to many introduced diseases. An outbreak of smallpox in April 1789 killed about half the Aboriginal population of the Sydney region while only one death was recorded among the settlers. The source of the outbreak is controversial; some researchers contend that it originated from contact with Indonesian fisherman in the far north and spread along Aboriginal trade routes while others argue that it is more likely to have been inadvertently or deliberately spread by settlers.

There were further smallpox outbreaks devastating Aboriginal populations from the late 1820s (affecting south-eastern Australia), in the early 1860s (travelling inland from the Coburg Peninsula in the north to the Great Australian Bight in the south), and in the late 1860s (from the Kimberley to Geraldton). According to Josphine Flood, the estimated Aboriginal mortality rate from smallpox was 60 per cent on first exposure, 50 per cent in the tropics, and 25 per cent in the arid interior.

Other introduced diseases such as measles, influenza, typhoid and tuberculosis also resulted in high death rates in Aboriginal communities. Butlin estimates that the Aboriginal population in the area of modern Victoria was around 50,000 in 1788 before two smallpox outbreaks reduced it to about 12,500 in 1830. Between 1835 (the settlement of Port Phillip) and 1853, the Aboriginal population of Victoria fell from 10,000 to around 2,000. It is estimated that about 60 per cent of these deaths were from introduced diseases, 18 per cent from natural causes and 15 per cent from settler violence.

Venereal diseases were also a factor in Indigenous depopulation, reducing Aboriginal fertility rates in south-eastern Australia by an estimated 40 per cent by 1855. By 1890 up to 50 per cent of the Aboriginal population in some regions of Queensland were affected.

=== Frontier violence ===
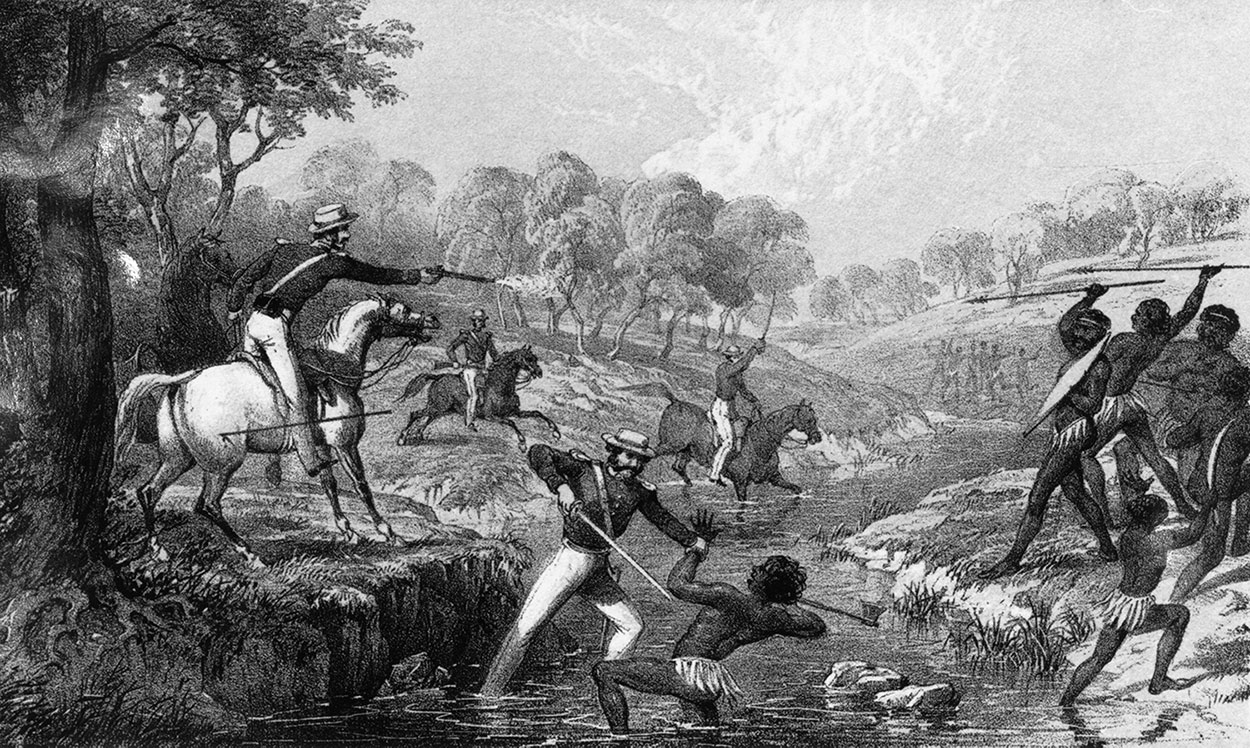
Mounted police engaging Aboriginal men during the Slaughterhouse Creek Massacre of 1838

Aboriginal reactions to the arrival of British settlers were varied, but often hostile when the presence of the colonists led to competition over resources, and to the occupation of Aboriginal lands. By contrast with New Zealand, no valid treaty was signed with any of Aboriginal peoples in Australia. Flood, however, points out that unlike New Zealand, Australia's Indigenous population was divided into hundreds of tribes and language groups, which did not have "chiefs" with whom treaties could be negotiated. Moreover, Aboriginal Australians had no concept of alienating their traditional land in return for political or economic benefits.

The British settlement was initially planned to be a self-sufficient penal colony based on agriculture. Karskens argues that conflict broke out between the settlers and the traditional owners of the land because of the settlers' assumptions about the superiority of British civilisation and their entitlement to land which they had "improved" through building and cultivation.

Conflict also arose from cross-cultural misunderstandings and from reprisals for previous actions such as the kidnapping of Aboriginal men, women and children. Reprisal attacks and collective punishments were perpetrated by colonists and Aboriginal groups alike. Sustained Aboriginal attacks on settlers, the burning of crops and the mass killing of livestock were more obviously acts of resistance to the loss of traditional land and food resources.

As the colony spread to the more fertile lands around the Hawkesbury river, north-west of Sydney, conflict between the settlers and the Darug people intensified, reaching a peak from 1794 to 1810. Bands of Darug people, led by Pemulwuy and later by his son Tedbury, burned crops, killed livestock and raided settler huts and stores in a pattern of resistance that was to be repeated as the colonial frontier expanded. A military garrison was established on the Hawkesbury in 1795. The death toll from 1794 to 1800 was 26 settlers and up to 200 Darug.

Conflict again erupted from 1814 to 1816 with the expansion of the colony into Dharawal country in the Nepean region south-west of Sydney. Following the deaths of several settlers, Governor Macquarie despatched three military detachments into Dharawal lands, culminating in the Appin massacre (April 1816) in which at least 14 Aboriginal people were killed.

In the 1820s the colony spread to the lightly wooded pastures west of the Great Dividing Range, opening the way for large scale farming and grazing in Wiradjuri country. From 1822 to 1824 Windradyne led a group of 50-100 Aboriginal men in raids on livestock and stockmen's huts resulting in the death of 15-20 colonists. Martial law was declared in August 1824 and ended five months later when Windradyne and 260 of his followers ended their armed resistance. Estimates of Aboriginal deaths in the conflict range from 15 to 100.

After two decades of sporadic violence between settlers and Aboriginal Tasmanians in Van Diemen's land, the Black War broke out in 1824, following a rapid expansion of settler numbers and sheep grazing in the island's interior. When Eumarrah, leader of the North Midlands people, was captured in 1828 he said his patriotic duty was to kill as many white people as possible because they had driven his people off their kangaroo hunting grounds. Martial law was declared in the settled districts of Van Diemen's Land in November 1828 and was extended to the entire island in October 1830. A "Black Line" of around 2,200 troops and settlers then swept the island with the intention of driving the Aboriginal population from the settled districts. From 1830 to 1834 George Augustus Robinson and Aboriginal ambassadors including Truganini led a series of "Friendly Missions" to the Aboriginal tribes which effectively ended the Black War. Flood states that around 200 settler and 330 Aboriginal Tasmanian deaths in frontier violence were recorded during the period 1803 to 1834, but adds that it will never be known how many Aboriginal deaths went unreported. Clements estimates that colonists killed 600 Aboriginal people in eastern Van Diemen's Land during the Black War. Around 220 Aboriginal Tasmanians were eventually relocated to Flinders Island.

As settlers and pastoralists spread into the region of modern Victoria in the 1830s, competition for land and natural resources again sparked conflict with traditional landowners. Aboriginal resistance was so intense that it was not unusual for sheep runs to be abandoned after repeated attacks. Broome estimates that 80 settlers and 1,000–1,500 Aboriginal people died in frontier conflict in Victoria from 1835 to 1853.

The growth of the Swan River Colony (centred on Fremantle and Perth) in the 1830s led to conflict with a number of clans of the Noongar people. Governor Sterling established a mounted police force in 1834 and in October that year he led a mixed force of soldiers, mounted police and civilians in a punitive expedition against the Pindjarup. The expedition culminated in the Pinjarra massacre in which some 15 to 30 Aboriginal people were killed. According to Neville Green, 30 settlers and 121 Aboriginal people died in violent conflict in Western Australia between 1826 and 1852.

Aboriginal casualty rates in conflicts increased as the colonists made greater use of mounted police, Native Police units, and newly developed revolvers and breech-loaded guns. Civilian colonists often launched punitive raids against Aboriginal groups without the knowledge of colonial authorities. Conflict was particularly intense in NSW in the 1840s.

The spread of British settlement also led to an increase in inter-tribal Aboriginal conflict as more people were forced off their traditional lands into the territory of other, often hostile, tribes. Butlin estimated that of the 8,000 Aboriginal deaths in Victoria from 1835 to 1855, 200 were from inter-tribal violence.

=== Accommodation and protection ===
In the first two years of settlement the Aboriginal people of Sydney, after initial curiosity, mostly avoided the newcomers. Governor Phillip had a number of Aboriginal people kidnapped in an attempt to learn their language and customs. In November 1790, 18 months after the smallpox epidemic that had devastated the Aboriginal population, Bennelong led the survivors of several clans into Sydney. Later, he and a companion became the first Aboriginal people to sail for Europe, when, in 1792 they accompanied Governor Phillip to England and were presented to King George III. Bungaree, a Kuringgai man, joined Matthew Flinders in his circumnavigation of Australia from 1801 to 1803, playing an important role as emissary to the various Indigenous peoples they encountered.

Governor Macquarie hoped to "effect the civilization of the Aborigines" and reclaim them "from their barbarous practices". In 1815, he established a Native Institution to provide elementary education to Aboriginal children, settled 15 Aboriginal families on farms in Sydney and made the first freehold land grant to Aboriginal people at Black Town, west of Sydney. In 1816, he initiated an annual Native Feast at Parramatta which attracted Aboriginal people from as far as the Bathurst plains. However, by the 1820s the Native Institution and Aboriginal farms had failed. Aboriginal people continued to live on vacant waterfront land and on the fringes of the Sydney settlement, adapting traditional practices to the new semi-urban environment.

Escalating frontier conflict in the 1820s and 1830s saw colonial governments develop a number of policies aimed at protecting Aboriginal people. Protectors of Aborigines were appointed in South Australia and the Port Phillip District in 1839, and in Western Australia in 1840. While the aim was to extend the protection of British law to Aboriginal people, more often the result was an increase in their criminalisation. Protectors were also responsible for the distribution of rations, delivering elementary education to Aboriginal children, instruction in Christianity and training in occupations useful to the colonists. However, by 1857 the protection offices had been closed due to their cost and failure to meets their goals.

Colonial governments established a small number of reserves and encouraged Christian missions which afforded some protection from frontier violence. In 1825, the NSW governor granted 10,000 acres for an Aboriginal mission at Lake Macquarie. In the 1830s and early 1840s there were also missions in the Wellington Valley, Port Phillip and Moreton Bay. The settlement for Aboriginal Tasmanians on Flinders Island operated effectively as a mission under George Robinson from 1835 to 1838.

In more densely settled areas, most Aboriginal people who had lost control of their land lived on reserves and missions, or on the fringes of cities and towns. In pastoral districts the British Waste Land Act 1848 gave traditional landowners limited rights to live, hunt and gather food on Crown land under pastoral leases. Many Aboriginal groups camped on pastoral stations where Aboriginal men were often employed as shepherds and stockmen. These groups were able to retain a connection with their lands and maintain aspects of their traditional culture.

== Politics and government ==
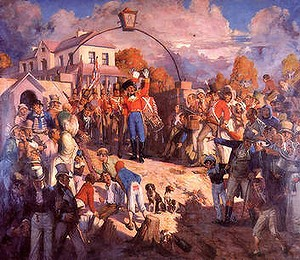
The Rum Rebellion of 1808

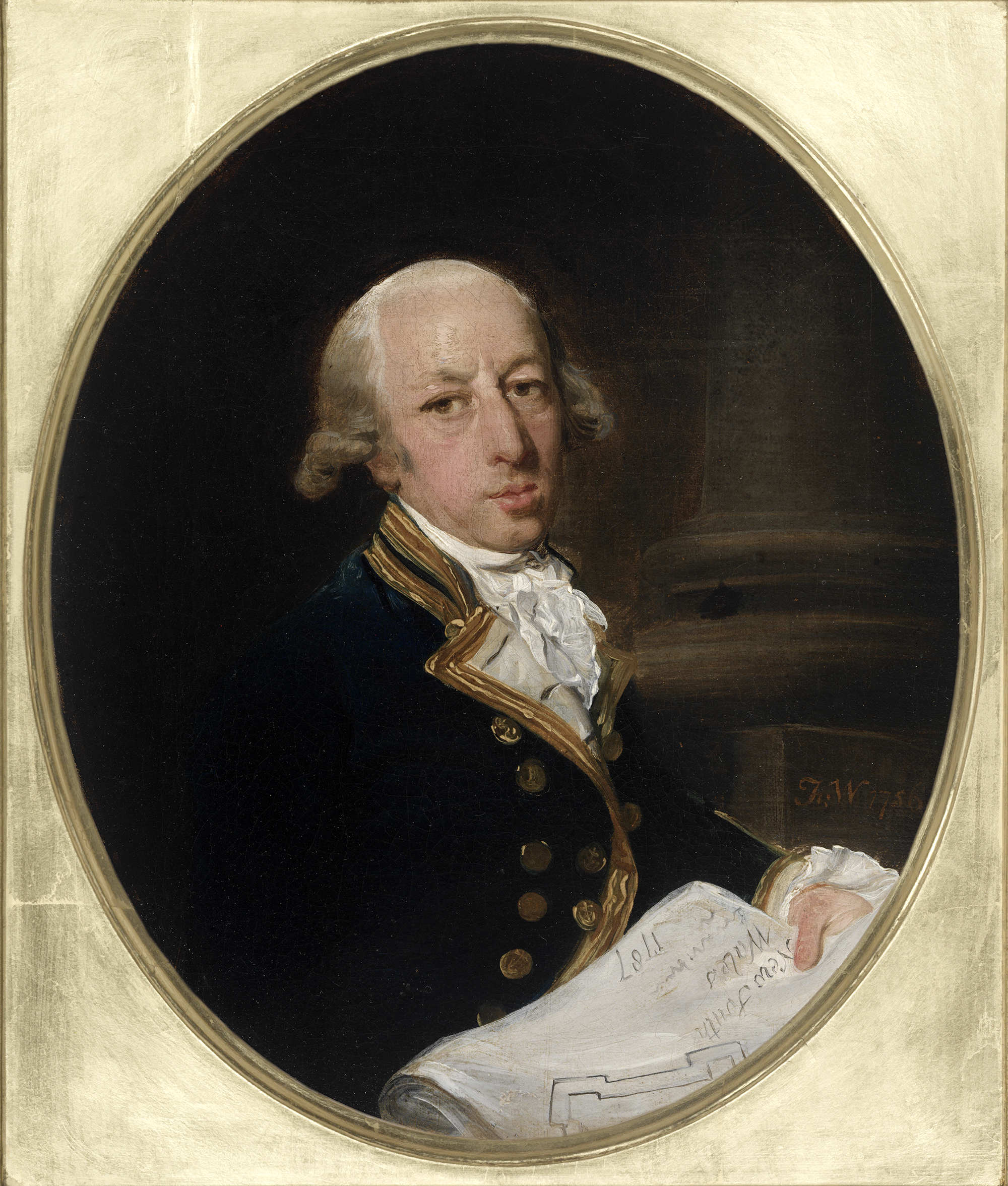
Captain Arthur Phillip, RN, served as the first Governor of New South Wales

Traditional Aboriginal society had been governed by councils of elders and a collective decision-making process, but the first European-style governments established after 1788 were autocratic and run by appointed governors—although English law was transplanted into the Australian colonies by virtue of the doctrine of reception, thus notions of the rights and processes established by the Magna Carta and the Bill of Rights 1689 were brought from Britain by the colonists. Agitation for representative government began soon after the settlement of the colonies.

From 1788 until the 1850s, the governance of the colonies, including most policy decision-making, was largely in the hands of the governors, who were directly responsible to the government in London (Home Office until 1794; War Office until 1801; and War and Colonial Office until 1854). The first governor of New South Wales, Arthur Phillip, was given executive and legislative powers to establish courts, military forces, fight enemies, give out land grants, and regulate the economy.

The early colonists adopted the British political culture of the time, which allowed the use of public office for furthering private interests, which led to officers of the New South Wales Corps, which had replaced the original marines in 1791, trying to use their position in order to create monopolies on trade. Such private enterprise was encouraged by the second governor Francis Grose, who had replaced Phillip in 1792, and he started giving out land and convict labourers to the officers. The Corps established a monopoly on the rum trade, and became very powerful within the small colony. After Governor William Bligh tried to break the military monopoly and questioned some of their leases, officers led by George Johnston launched a coup d'état in the Rum Rebellion. After a year, he agreed to leave his position, and returned to Britain alongside Johnston, who was found guilty by a court-martial. In response to the events, the British government dispanded the Corps, and replaced them with the 73rd Regiment, which led to "deprivatising" of the officials of the colony. Many of the officers retired, and were later known as the "faction of 1808" and as an influential and conservative element in the politics of the colony.

The New South Wales Act 1823 by the Parliament of the United Kingdom established the first legislative body in Australia, the New South Wales Legislative Council, as an appointed body of five to seven members to advise the Governor of New South Wales. However, the new body had limited powers of oversight. The act also established the Supreme Court of New South Wales, which had power over the executive. Before a Governor could propose a law before the council, the Chief Justice had to certify that it was not against English law, creating a form of judicial review. However, there was no separation of powers, with Chief Justice Francis Forbes also serving in the Legislative Council as well as the Governor's Executive Council. The Executive Council had been founded in 1825, and was composed of leading officials in the colony.

The Australian began publishing in 1824, as did The Monitor in 1826, and The Sydney Morning Herald in 1831. Ralph Darling tried to control the press first by proposing to license newspapers and impose a stamp duty on them, and after this was refused by Forbes, by prosecuting their owners for seditious libel.

Van Diemen's Land was established in 1825, but remained under the jurisdiction of the New South Wales Governor, being represented there by a lieutenant-governor. Western Australia was declared to the British Empire by James Stirling, and the Swan River Colony was established there in 1829, with Stirling made governor in 1831. The South Australian Company was established in 1834 as a private venture to establish a new colony in the south coast, being motivated by the social reformist ideas of Jeremy Bentham.

=== Political divisions ===
The divide between liberals and conservatives in British politics was replicated in Australia. This division was also affected by that between "emancipists" (former convicts) and "exclusivists" (land-owning free settlers). The conservatives generally saw representative government as a threat, since they were worried about former convicts voting against their masters. The leader of the conservatives was John Macarthur, a wool producer and a leader of the Rum Rebellion. The conservatives believed themselves to be leading and protecting the economic development of the colony.

The reformist attorney general, John Plunkett, sought to apply Enlightenment principles to governance in the colony, pursuing the establishment of equality before the law, first by extending jury rights to emancipists, then by extending legal protections to convicts, assigned servants and Aboriginal peoples. Plunkett twice charged the colonist perpetrators of the Myall Creek massacre of Aboriginal people with murder, resulting in a conviction and his landmark Church Act of 1836 disestablished the Church of England and established legal equality between Anglicans, Catholics, Presbyterians and later Methodists.

=== Representative government ===
The Legislative Council and Supreme Court provided additional limits to the power of governors, but a number of prominent colonial figures, including William Wentworth campaigned for a greater degree of self-government. However, there were divisions about the extent to which a future legislative body should be popularly elected. Other major issues in the public debate about colonial self-government were traditional British political rights, land policy, transportation and whether colonies with a large population of convicts and former convicts could be trusted with self-government. The Australian Patriotic Association was formed in 1835 by Wentworth and William Bland to promote representative government for New South Wales.

In 1840, the Adelaide City Council and the Sydney City Council were established. Men who possessed 1,000 pounds' worth of property were able to stand for election and wealthy landowners were permitted up to four votes each in elections.

The opening of Australia's first elected Legislative Council in Sydney, 1843

The British government abolished transportation to New South Wales in 1840, and in 1842 granted limited representative government to the colony by establishing a reformed Legislative Council with one-third of its members appointed by the governor and two-thirds elected by male voters who met a property qualification. The property qualification meant that only 20 per cent of males were eligible to vote in the first Legislative Council elections in 1843.

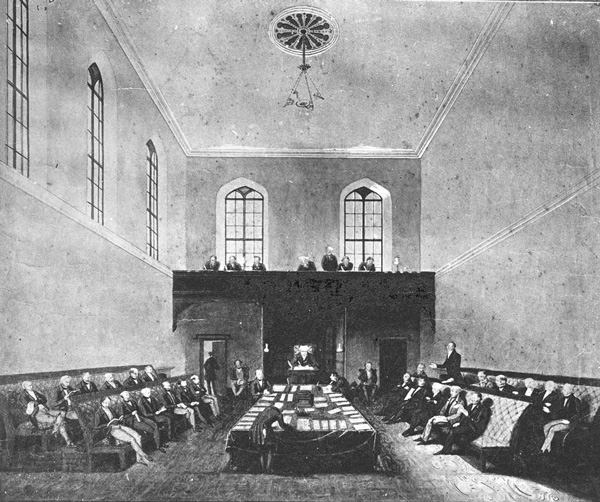
The first meeting of the New South Wales Legislative Council in 1843

The increasing immigration of free settlers, the declining number of convicts, and the growing middle class and working class population led to further agitation for liberal and democratic reforms. Public meetings in Adelaide in 1844 called for more representative government for South Australia. The Constitutional Association, formed in Sydney in 1848, called for manhood suffrage. The Anti-Transportation League, founded in Van Diemen's Land in 1849, also demanded more representative government. In the Port Phillip District, agitation for representative government was closely linked to demands for independence from New South Wales.

In 1850, the imperial parliament passed the Australian Colonies Government Act, granting Van Diemen's Land, South Australia and the newly created colony of Victoria semi-elected Legislative Councils on the New South Wales model. The Act also reduced the property requirement for voting. Government officials were to be responsible to the governor rather than the Legislative Council, so the imperial legislation provided for limited representative government rather than responsible government.

== Economy and trade ==
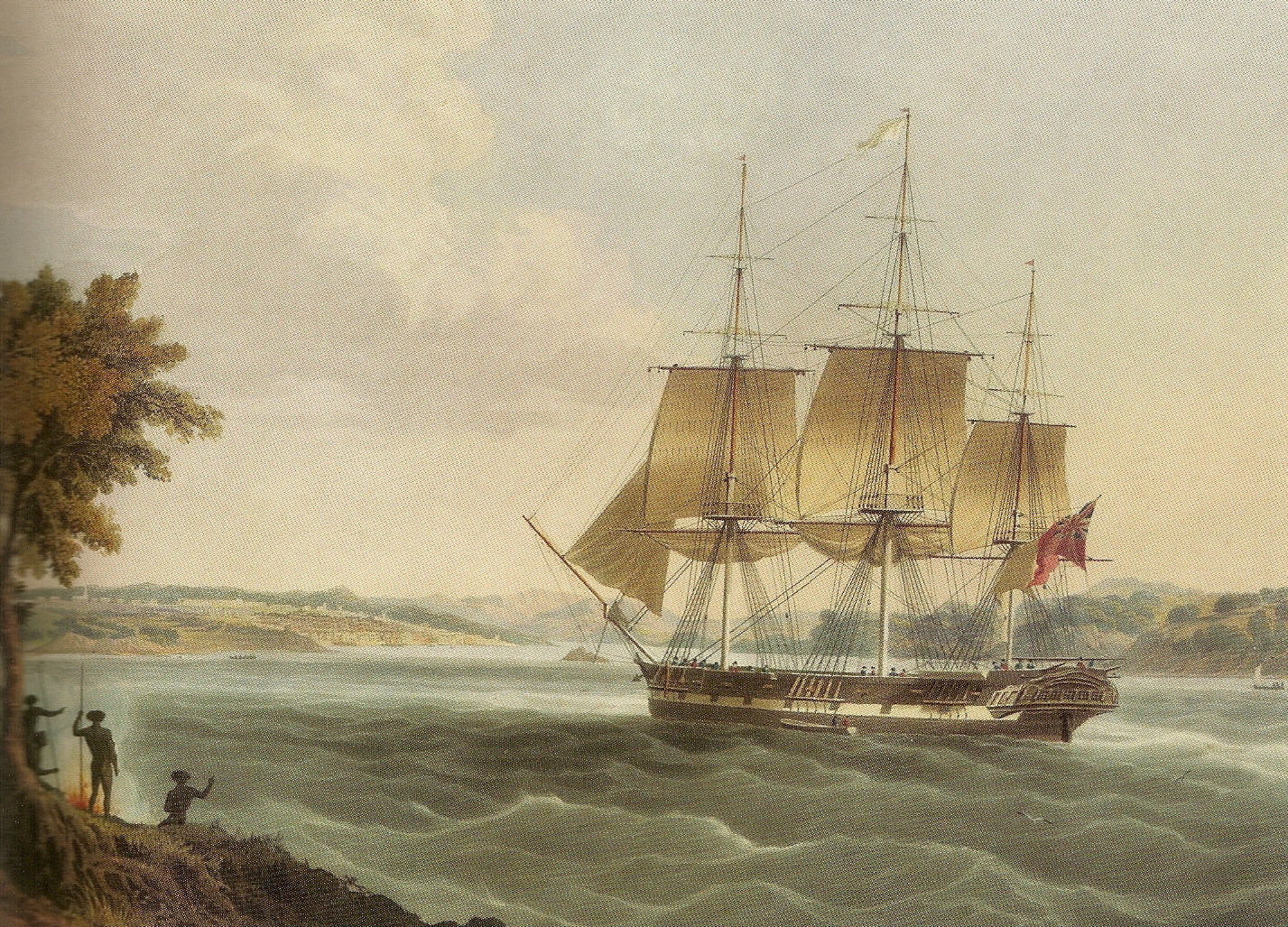
The Mellish entering Sydney Harbour. It was one of the ships that imported resources from India, playing a vital role in establishing Sydney.

The instructions provided to the first five governors of New South Wales show that the initial plans for the colony were limited. The settlement was to be a self-sufficient penal colony based on subsistence agriculture. Trade, shipping and ship building were banned in order to keep the convicts isolated and so as not to interfere with the trade monopoly of the British East India Company. There was no plan for economic development apart from investigating the possibility of producing raw materials for Britain.

After the departure of Phillip, the colony's military officers began acquiring land and importing consumer goods obtained from visiting ships. Former convicts also farmed land granted to them and engaged in trade. Farms spread to the more fertile lands surrounding Paramatta, Windsor and Camden, and by 1803 the colony was self-sufficient in grain. Boat building developed in order to make travel easier and exploit the marine resources of the coastal settlements. Sealing and whaling became important industries.

Because of its nature as a forced settlement, the early colony's economy was heavily dependent on the state. For example, some of the earliest agricultural production was directly run by the government. The Commissariat also played a major role in the economy. In 1800, 72% of the population relied on government rations, but this was reduced to 32% by 1806. While some convicts were assigned to settlers as labourers, they were usually free to find part-time work for supplemental income, and were allowed to own property (in contravention to British law at the time). Some convicts had their skills taken to use by the colonial government, as with for example the architect Francis Greenway, who designed many early public buildings. Approximately 10–15% of the convicts worked on public projects building infrastructure, while most of the rest were assigned to private employers. Land grants were abandoned in 1831 in favour of selling crown lands, which covered all land deemed "unsettled".

The colonies relied heavily on imports from England for survival. The official currency of the colonies was the British pound, but the unofficial currency and most readily accepted trade good was rum. The early economy relied on barter for exchange, an issue which Macquarie (Governor from 1810 to 1821) tried to fix first by introducing Spanish dollars, and then by establishing the Bank of New South Wales with the authority to issue financial instruments. Barter continued, however, until shipments of sterling in the late 1820s enabled a move to a monetary economy.

Macquarie also played a leading role in the economic development of New South Wales by employing a planner to design the street layout of Sydney and commissioning the construction of roads, wharves, churches, and public buildings. He sent explorers out from Sydney and, in 1815, a road across the Blue Mountains was completed, opening the way for large scale farming and grazing in the lightly-wooded pastures west of the Great Dividing Range.

The colonists spent a large part of the early nineteenth century building infrastructure such as railways, bridges and schools, which facilitated economic development. During this period Australian businesspeople began to prosper. For example, the partnership of Berry and Wollstonecraft made enormous profits by means of land grants, convict labour, and exporting native cedar back to England. John Macarthur, after retiring from the New South Wales Corps, went on to start the wool industry in Australia.

From the 1820s squatters increasingly established unauthorised cattle and sheep runs beyond the official limits of the settled colony. In 1836, a system of annual licences authorising grazing on Crown Land was introduced in an attempt to control the pastoral industry, but booming wool prices and the high cost of land in the settled areas encouraged further squatting. By 1844 wool accounted for half of the colony's exports and by 1850 most of the eastern third of New South Wales was controlled by fewer than 2,000 pastoralists.

== Religion, education, and culture ==
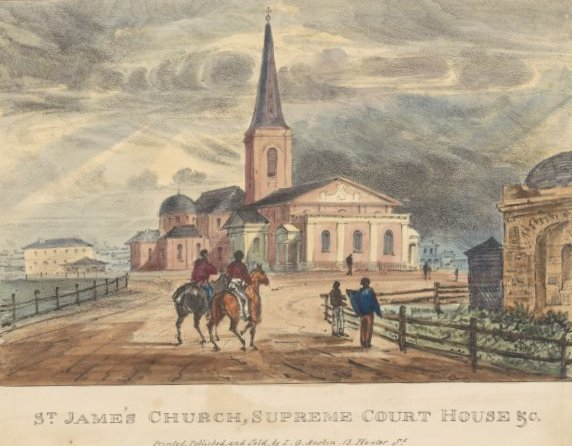
St James' Church, Sydney, about 1836. It was designed by Francis Greenway and still stands.

=== Religion ===
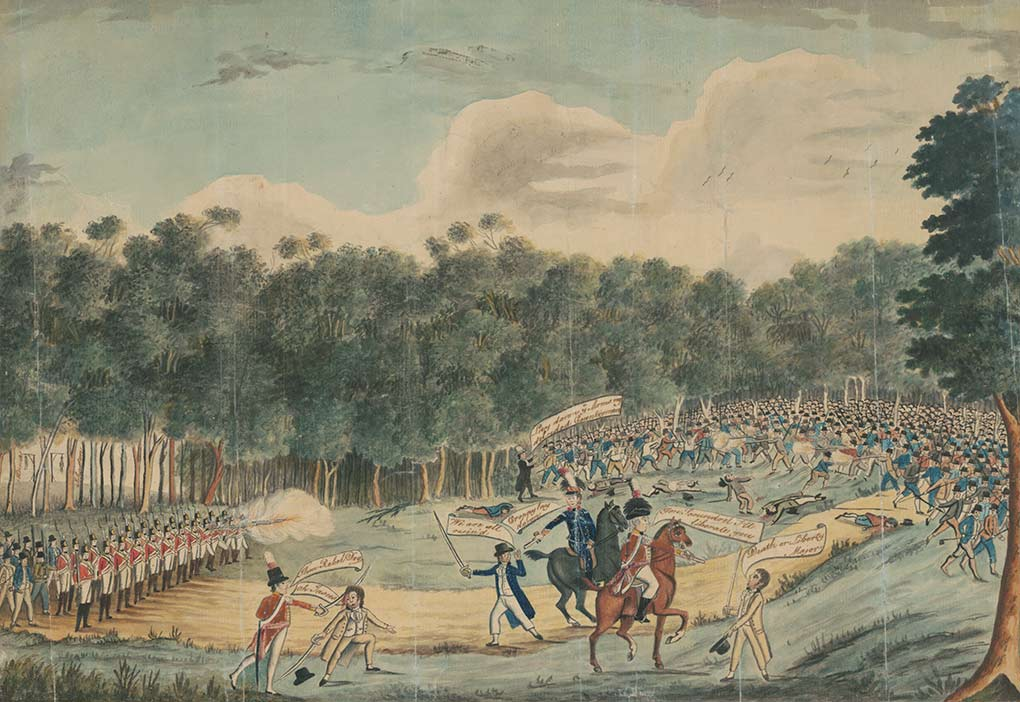
A painting depicting the Castle Hill Rebellion in Sydney of 1804

According to Australian Aboriginal mythology and the animist framework, the Dreaming is a sacred era in which ancestral totemic spirit beings formed The Creation. The Dreaming established the laws and structures of society and the ceremonies performed to ensure continuity of life and land.

The early chaplains of the colony were also civil magistrates with the power to discipline convicts and grant tickets of leave. The Church of England was the only recognised church before 1820 and its clergy worked closely with the governors. Richard Johnson, (chief chaplain 1788–1802) was charged by Governor Arthur Phillip, with improving "public morality" in the colony and was also heavily involved in health and education. Samuel Marsden (various ministries 1795–1838) became known for his missionary work, the severity of his punishments as a magistrate, and the vehemence of his public denunciations of Catholicism and Irish convicts.

About a quarter of convicts were Catholics and they frequently requested a Catholic priest to perform their rites. The lack of official recognition of Catholicism was combined with suspicion of Irish convicts which only increased after the Irish-led Castle Hill Rebellion of 1804. Only two Catholic priests operated temporarily in the colony before Governor Macquarie appointed official Catholic chaplains in New South Wales and Van Diemen's Land in 1820.

The Bigge reports recommended that the status of the Anglican Church be enhanced as a source of stability and moral authority in the colony. An Anglican archdeacon was appointed in 1824 and allocated a seat in the first advisory Legislative Council. The Anglican clergy and schools also received state support. This policy was changed under Governor Burke by the Church Acts of 1836 and 1837. The government now provided state support for the clergy and church buildings of the four largest denominations: Anglican, Catholic, Presbyterian and, later, Methodist.

The Church Acts did not alleviate sectarianism as many Anglicans saw state support of the Catholic Church as a threat. The prominent Presbyterian minister John Dunmore Lang also promoted sectarian divisions in the 1840s. State support, however, led to a growth in church activities. Charitable associations such as the Catholic Sisters of Charity, founded in 1838, provided hospitals, orphanages and asylums for the old and disabled. Religious organisations were also the main providers of school education in the first half of the nineteenth century.

=== Education ===
The first school in the colony was opened in 1789. By 1792, the government had established two public schools for the children of convicts and emancipists. The teachers themselves were female convicts or emancipists. The military also established a school for soldiers and their children.

By the early 1800s, public schools were established in the main settlements and some teachers were opening private academies with tuition fees. Public schools were run by the Church of England and taught reading, writing, arithmetic and scripture. They were funded by the government, the British Society for the Propagation of the Gospel, and community donations. Clergy and professional teachers were sometimes recruited from Britain but most teachers were from the colony. The London Missionary Society also established several chapel-schools outside the main settlements. Nevertheless, school was not compulsory and many parents preferred to have their children work or help in the home rather than send them to the nearest public school. Affluent colonists sent their children to Britain or local private academies for schooling, or engaged a tutor or governess.

An orphan school for girls opened in Sydney in 1801, and one for boys in 1819. Governor Macquarie (1810-1821) established charity schools and, in 1815, a Native Institution for Aboriginal children which provided basic education and training in work skills. In 1826, the Church of England attempted to establish a system of schools through a Church and Schools Corporation but with limited success.

In the 1830s, most colonial governments offered support for schools in the recognised Anglican, Catholic, Presbyterian and Methodist denominations. In South Australia, Lutherans established schools without government support. In Western Australia, the Catholic church established the first schools. Church-run schools spread to most major towns in the colonies and were the largest provider of school education.

Education intended for the working classes was also provided by mechanics' institutes and schools of arts. These institutions were opened in Hobart (1827), Sydney (1833), Melbourne (1839), Geelong (1846), Brisbane (1849) and Perth (1851). They were intended to provide adult education in literacy, numeracy, the liberal arts and technical subjects.

Private schools based on British models of grammar schools and public schools also appeared from the 1830s. These included Sydney College (1830), the Australian College (Sydney, 1831) and The King's School (Sydney and Parramatta,1831).

=== Science and technology ===
The new colony was of particular scientific and technological interest in Britain. Up to 1820, Joseph Banks was the chief promoter of the colony's importance to botany and agricultural technology and he corresponded frequently with the early governors on these subjects. William Hooker also promoted the study of Australia's plant life, Roderick Murchison its geology, and Richard Owen its zoology and palaeontology.

Banks organised Matthew Flinders' 1801-03 circumnavigation of the continent, and ensured the crew included an astronomer, a mineralogist and a botanist. The early explorations of surveyor John Oxley involved the mapping of rivers and his parties also included botanists and a mineralogist. The explorations of Sturt and Mitchell were intended to facilitate the economic and scientific development of the colony. In agricultural technology, there were Australian advances in sheep breeding, particularly the development of merino wool. In 1843, John Miller invented the horse-drawn wheat stripper.

An astronomical observatory was set up in Sydney in 1788, and governor Brisbane established a permanent one at Parramatta in 1824. In 1835 the observatory published the Catalogue of 7385 Stars. The Parramatta observatory was closed in 1847 before the Sydney Observatory was opened in 1855. The Admiralty established a Magnetical and Meteorological Observatory at Hobart in 1840.

The Royal Botanic Garden was established in Sydney in 1816, and Charles Frazer was appointed Colonial Botanist in 1821. The Australian Museum was founded in Sydney in 1827. The Tasmanian Society, founded in 1837, was Australia's leading scientific society at the time. The Royal Society of Van Diemen's Land for Botany, Horticulture and the Advancement of Science was established in 1844. The University of Sydney, founded in 1850, included chairs in mathematics, chemistry and physics.

Colonial medical science was based on existing European knowledge and practice. Over a hundred men who practised medicine were transported to Australia as convicts between 1788 and 1868. Medical qualifications were not standardised at the time, and many would have been unqualified. D'Arcy Wentworth was a free settler and assistant surgeon on a convict ship. In 1809 he was appointed Principal Surgeon of the colony. He was instrumental in the opening of the new Sydney hospital in 1816. William Redfern was a convict and surgeon who passed an examination before three colonial doctors, becoming Australia's first locally qualified doctor. William Bland was a convict and qualified surgeon. He was pardoned in 1815 and set up a private medical practice. He later worked with the Benevolent Society and the Sydney Dispensary before embarking on a political career. He was a skilled surgeon who made important contributions to surgical techniques.

=== Culture ===
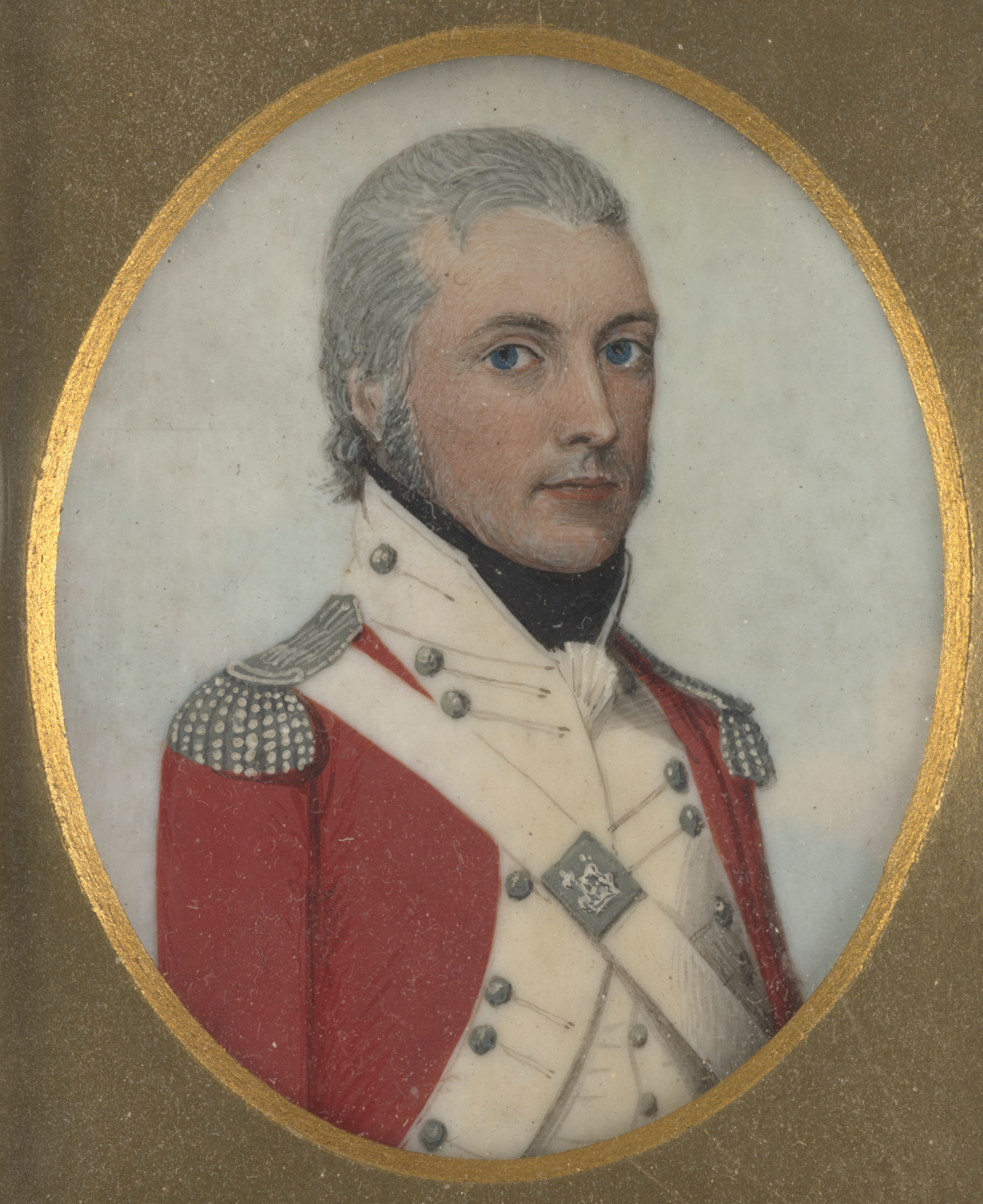
Watkin Tench, captain-lieutenant of the Royal Marines on the First Fleet, author of popular works describing the new colony

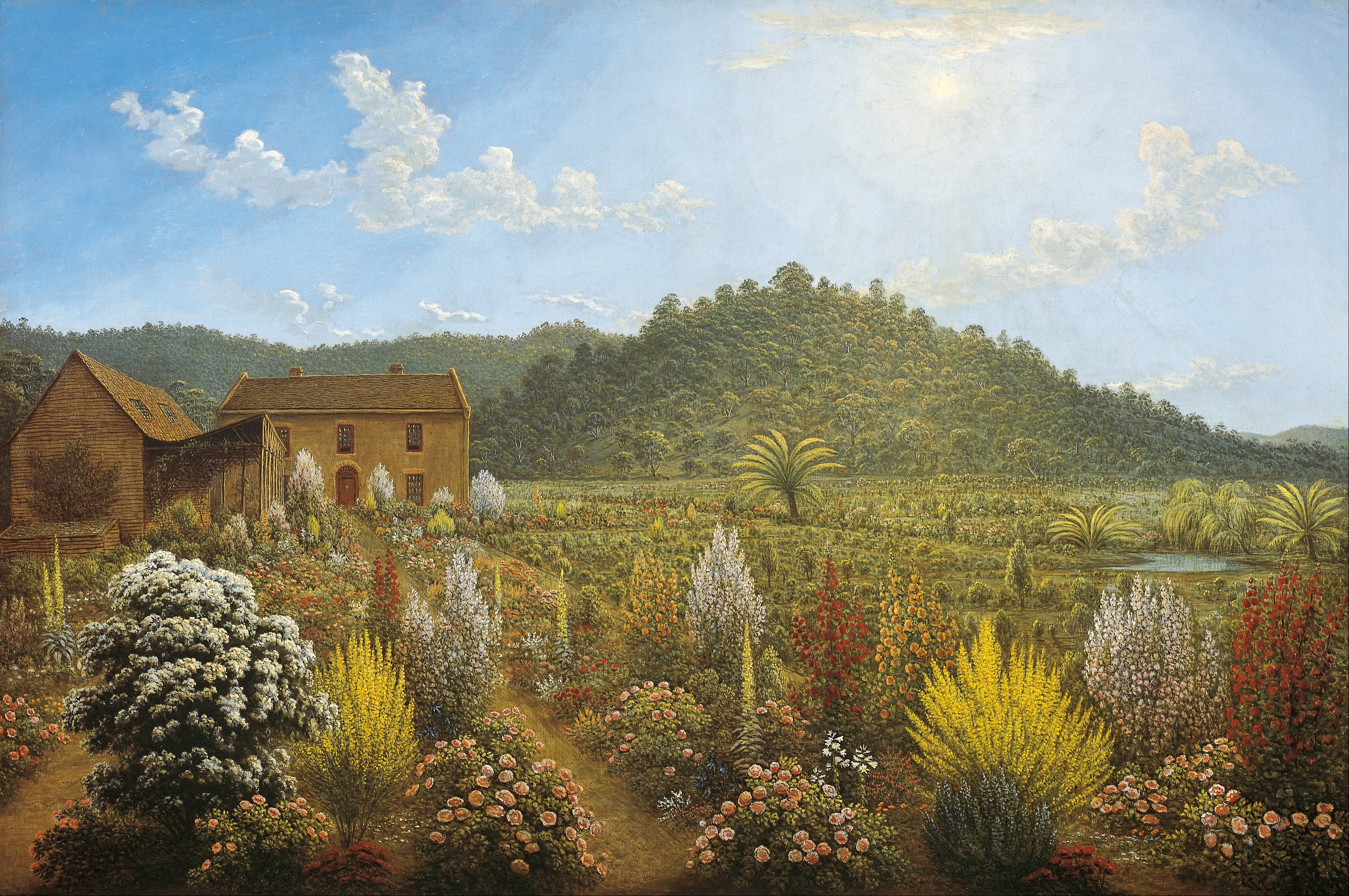
The house and garden, in Mills Plains, Van Diemen's Land, of prominent early Australian artist John Glover

Aboriginal groups continued the artistic traditions they had practised for thousands of years. They made art works on bark, stone and their bodies, and in the sand and earth of their land. They told stories of ancestral beings and the Dreaming. They performed their culture and its stories in song, music and dance. Songmen and women were skilled in correctly singing the songlines of the ancestral beings who created the landscape, and in passing on new songs sent to them in dreams. Aboriginal history, law and creation stories were transmitted orally through generations.

The colonists also transmitted their cultures orally and through song, music, art and performance, but also through writing. Governor Macquarie commissioned emancipist Michael Massey Robinson to write verse to celebrate the birthdays of George III and Queen Charlotte. Alongside such official verse, satirical verse written by convicts such as Frank the Poet flourished.

Barron Field, the supreme court judge, published First Fruits of Australian Poetry (1819 and 1823). His poem "The Kangaroo" is notable. Early poems with patriotic Australian themes include William Wentworth's "Australasia" (1823) and Charles Thompson's Wild Notes From the Lyre of a Native Minstrel (1826). In 1845, the radical republican Charles Harpur published Thoughts: a Series of Sonnets and went on to become an influential Australian poet.

Before the 1850s, there was no Australian book publishing industry and few professional authors. Stories and poetry were published in newspapers and magazines, and books were mostly published in Britain or self-published in Australia. In prose, colonial officers Watkin Tench and David Collins published popular early accounts of the colony. Most published prose consisted of works of non-fiction, tales or sketches of colonial life, travel stories and popular fiction. Biographies and novels of convicts were popular. Henry Savery's novel of convict life Quintus Servinton (1830–31) and James Tucker's Ralph Rashleigh (1844–45) were typical. Novels of emigration to Australia, such as Thomas McCombie's Adventures of a Colonist (1845), became popular in the 1840s. Mary Theresa Vidal's Tales for the Bush (1845) was popular in England and Australia and went through many editions.

In art, the Port Jackson Painters recorded the growth of the settlement, the local Aboriginal people and the flora and fauna of the colony. Convict artists such as Thomas Watling, Joseph Lycett and Thomas Bock painted landscapes, portraits of affluent settlers, scenes of colonial life and official commissions. Augustus Earle, John Glover and Conrad Martens were English artists who visited or migrated to Australia in the 1820s and 1830s and painted influential Australian landscapes.

Australia's first colonial music was the popular ballads, sea shanties and folk songs brought by convicts and settlers. Military music was also commonly performed in the early years of the colony. Military musicians often performed at church services, balls and other official and private functions. The first known local composition was a set of quadrilles written by the bandmaster Reichenberg in 1825. English musician John Phillip Deane (who arrived in Australia in 1822), Irish composer William Vincent Wallace (who arrived in 1835) and English composer Isaac Nathan (who arrived in 1841) all helped develop a musical culture in the Australian colonies.

The first play performed in Australia was a 1789 convict production of Farquar's The Recruiting Officer. Theatrical performances after this were sporadic, as religious authorities considered the theatre promoted immorality. But by the 1830s, popular demand for comedies, melodramas and pantomime led to regular commercial theatrical and musical performances in Sydney and Hobart. Edward Geoghegan's The Currency Lass (1844) was a popular example of colonial musical comedy.

== Representations in literature and film ==
- Marcus Clarke's 1874 novel, For the Term of his Natural Life, and the 1983 television adaptation of the novel.
- Eleanor Dark's 1947 Timeless Land trilogy, which spans the colonisation from 1788 to 1811. The 1980s television drama, The Timeless Land, was based on this trilogy.
- Kate Grenville's 2005 novel The Secret River, about a convict transported to Australia for theft and his family, and their confrontations with Aboriginal people.

== See also ==
- British colonisation of South Australia
- British colonisation of Tasmania
- European Australian
- Europeans in Oceania
- Historical Records of Australia
- History of Australia
- History of Australia (1851–1900)
- History of New South Wales
- History of Queensland
- History of South Australia
- History of Tasmania
- History of Western Australia
- Journals of the First Fleet
