= William Call (disambiguation) =

William Call was High Sheriff of Essex.

William Call may also refer to:

- Sir William Call, 3rd Baronet of the Call baronets
- Sir William Call, 4th Baronet of the Call baronets

== See also ==
- Call (surname)
