= Whiteford Music Festival =

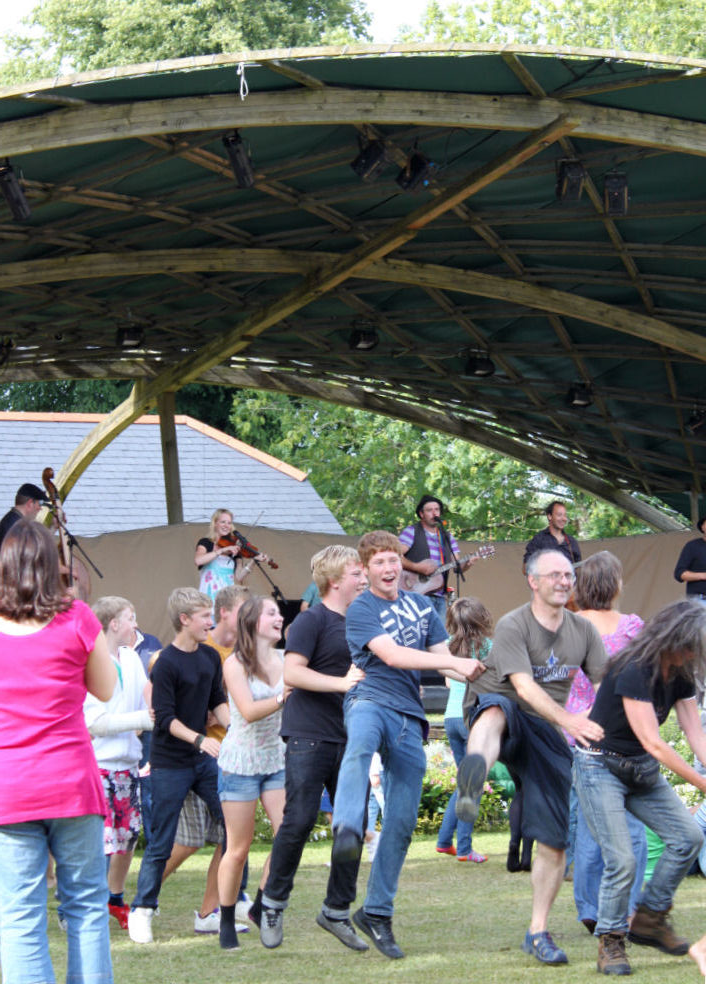
- Family Chill-out (day 3) at Whiteford in 2010 with Mad Dog McCrea headlining on the main stage
- Frequency: Annual
- Inaugurated: 2001
- Most recent: 2012
- Organiser: Friends of Stoke Climsland Parish Church
- Website: www.whitefordfestival.co.uk

The Whiteford Music Festival was a non-profit music festival, hosted yearly on the grounds of the Whiteford House in Cornwall, UK from 2001 to 2012. The festival was held over three days with Friday night swing, Saturday night orchestral 'Proms in the Park' with fireworks, and Sunday family chill-out.

== History ==
The festival was organised by local residents Peter and Caroline Hammond. The first event was held in 2001 with one band, and was not planned as an annual event. Organised by the Friends of Stoke Climsland Parish Church, it expanded into a three-day festival. By 2008, the event was attracting over 2,000 people.

The festival celebrated its 10th anniversary on 16 - 18 July 2010. It featured a combination of big band music, "Proms on the Lawn" featuring light orchestra and choir, with a firework finale, and "chill out" music. Sunday's event tied in with the BBC's "Big Lunch" campaign, designed to get communities and neighbours talking to each other more by having communal lunches and street parties. After a break in 2011, it returned the following year over the weekend of 15–17 June 2012 to celebrate the Queen's Diamond Jubilee. Despite the festival's award-winning success and popularity for over a decade, 2012 was the last annual Whiteford Festival. The organisers continued to support the local community at Stoke Climsland with other events.

This secular festival helped raise money for the physical (non-religious) maintenance and repair of the local Parish Church at Stoke Climsland and other charities including the Royal Marines Charitable Trust.
