= William Call =

British banker (1781-1851)

- Born: 28 September 1781
- Died: 3 December 1851 (aged 70)
- Occupation: Banker

Sir William Pratt Call, 2nd Baronet (28 September 1781 – 3 December 1851) is best known for holding the office of High Sheriff of Cornwall between 1807 and 1808, and for being a partner in a London banking house.

He was the fifth child and second son of Sir John Call of Whiteford, 1st Baronet (30 June 1732 – 1 March 1801) and his wife Philadelphia Batty. He was educated between 1797 and 1799 in Winchester College, and succeeded to the title of 2nd Baronet Call, of Whiteford, Cornwall, upon the death of his father on 1 March 1801. Call played first-class cricket 1817 and 1818 as a member of Marylebone Cricket Club (MCC).

He married Louisa Georgina Forbes (December, 1779 – 25 January 1830) on 19 June 1806. They had four children (three daughters and a son), as follows: Phillida Elizabeth, who married the Rev. George Henry Somerset in 1835; Georgiana Mary, who died in 1837; William Berkeley Call, who succeeded him as the third Baronet; and Augusta, who married Capt. George D. Patterson of the British 98th Regiment. The Baronetcy was extinguished with the death of fourth Baronet, William George Montagu Call, on 22 December 1864. He was a partner with Call, Marten & Company of Old Bond Street, a London banking house in which his father had also been a partner. He died at age 70 in Whiteford House, Stoke Climsland, Cornwall.

Baronetage of Great Britain
| Preceded by John Call | Baronet (of Whiteford); 1801–1851 | Succeeded by William Berkeley Call |
