= Call baronets =

Escutcheon of the Call baronets of Whiteford

The Call baronetcy, of Whiteford in the County of Cornwall, was a title in the Baronetage of Great Britain. It was created on 28 July 1791 for John Call, Member of Parliament for Callington from 1784 to 1801. He was succeeded by his son William, the 2nd Baronet, who served as High Sheriff of Cornwall. His son and successor, William, the 3rd Baronet, was also High Sheriff of Cornwall. The title became extinct on the death of the latter's son, the 4th Baronet, in 1903.

== Call baronets, of Whiteford (1791) ==
- Sir John Call, 1st Baronet (1732–1801)
- Sir William Pratt Call, 2nd Baronet (1781–1851)
- Sir William Berkeley Call, 3rd Baronet (1815–1864)
- Sir William George Montagu Call, 4th Baronet (1849–1903)

== Notes ==
Baronetage of Great Britain
Preceded by Hawkins baronets	Call baronets of Trewithin; 28 July 1791	Succeeded by Jackson baronets
