= James Tucker (convict) =

Australian convict and author (1808–1888)

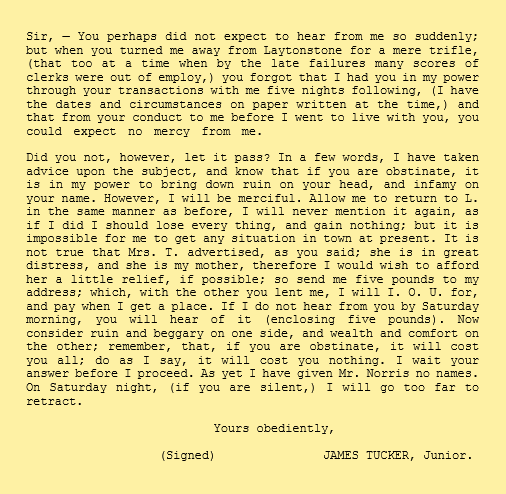
Copy of letter James Tucker sent to his cousin

James Rosenberg Tucker (1808–1888) was an Australian convict and alleged author from Bristol, England.

Under the pseudonym Giacomo di Rosenberg, Tucker is said to have written the autobiographical Ralph Rashleigh; or, The Life of an Exile in 1844. It was published in a heavily edited form in 1929, and the original manuscript was published in 1952. Tucker's authorship's of the work, however, is disputed.

Tucker was convicted at the Chelmsford Spring Assizes on 3 March 1826 of blackmailing his cousin, James Stanyford Tucker. He was tried before Sir William Alexander, C.B., "On an indictment for sending a threatening letter...accus[ing] of an infamous crime" and sentenced to transportation for life. He was 18 years old at the time. The next year he was put aboard the convict ship Midas, which sailed for Sydney Cove. He arrived in Sydney in 1827 and worked at Emu Plains, New South Wales. Still a convict, he was sent to Port Macquarie in 1844. He was in Goulburn from 1849 to 1853.

== Works ==
- Ralph Rashleigh
- Jemmy Green in Australia
