= John Call =

English engineer

Sir John Call, Bt
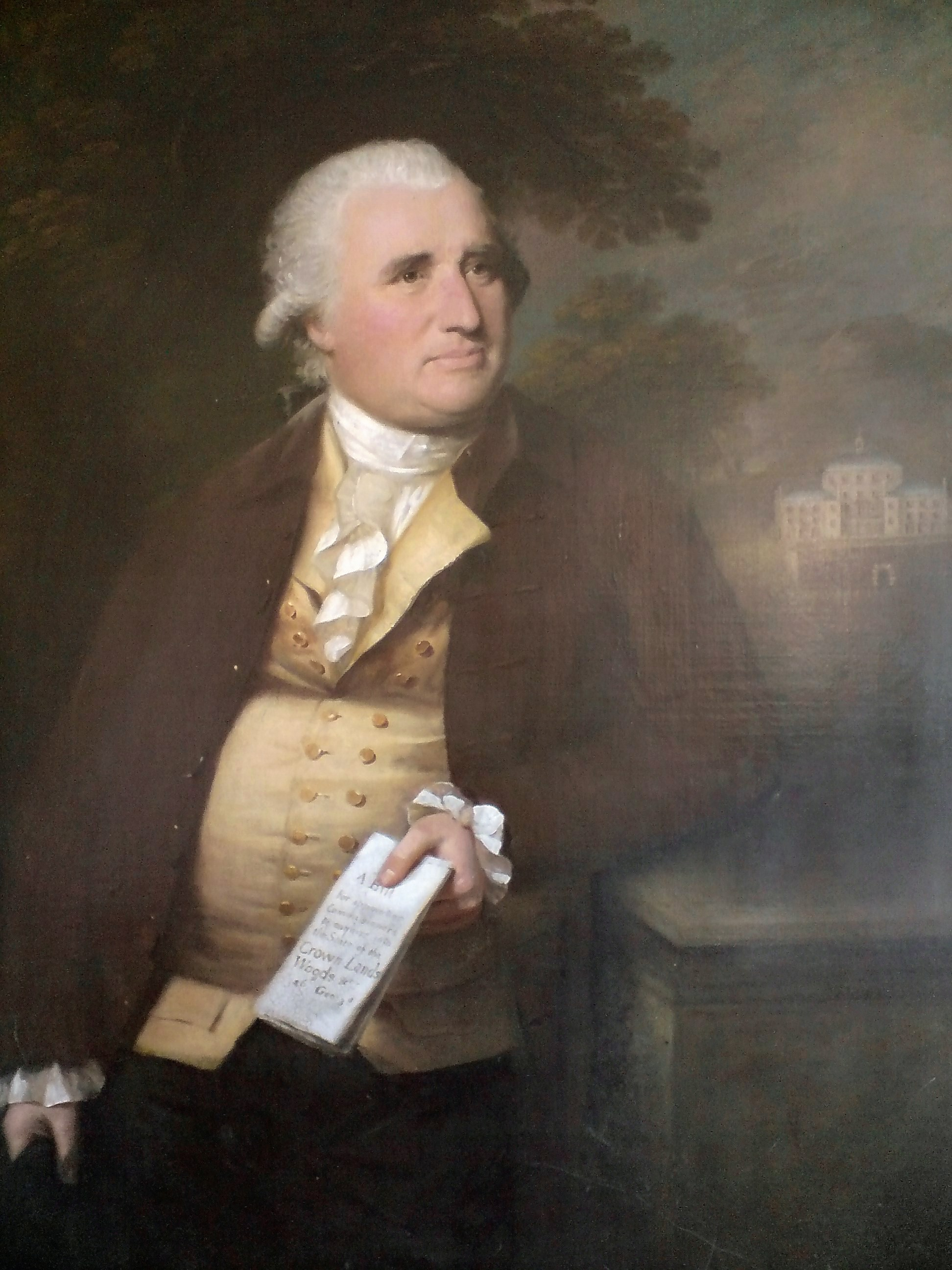
- 1779 oil painting of Sir John Call with Bodmin Jail in the background, artist unknown

Member of Parliament for Callington
- In office 1784–1801 Serving with Paul Orchard

Personal details
- Born: 30 June 1731 Fenny Park, Tiverton, Devon, Great Britain
- Died: 1 March 1801 (aged 69) Old Burlington Street, London, UK
- Resting place: St Margaret's old churchyard, Lee, Kent (now in the borough of Lewisham)

Military service
- Allegiance: Kingdom of Great Britain
- Branch/service: British Army
- Years of service: 1748-1766
- Rank: Captain General
- Unit: British East India Company

Sir John Call, 1st Baronet (30 June 1731 – 1 March 1801) was an English engineer and politician.

== Life ==
Call was born at Fenny Park, Tiverton, Devon. He was educated at Blundell's School and went to India at the age of 17 with Benjamin Robins, the chief engineer and captain-general of artillery in the East India Company's settlements. After the death of Robins, Call became engineer-in-chief, and eventually chief engineer with a seat on the Governor's Council. Robert Clive strongly recommended Call for the Governorship of Madras, but he had to return to England on the death of his father on 31 December 1766.

He was the leader of the Nawab of Arcot's creditors and when he stood for parliament in 1784 it was as part of a wider campaign to gain approval for a repayment scheme for those creditors.

On his return, he became High Sheriff of Cornwall for 1771–72 and was elected MP for Callington in 1784, a seat he held until his death. In 1784 he also became a partner in the Pybus and Son banking house and was created the 1st Baronet Call in 1791.

Call built Whiteford House near Stoke Climsland, Cornwall (demolished in 1913) and the nearby folly, Whiteford Temple, now owned by the Landmark Trust. He also built the reproduction Civil War fort on the summit of Kit Hill and was responsible for the construction of Bodmin Gaol in 1779.

He was elected a Fellow of the Royal Society in 1775, and a Fellow of the Society of Antiquaries in 1785.

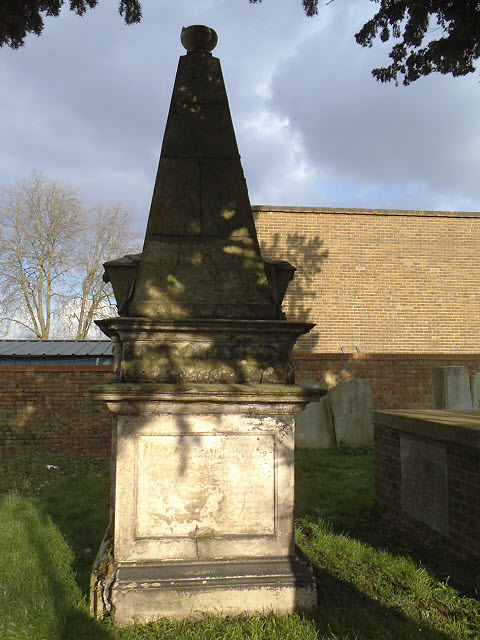
Monument to Sir John Call

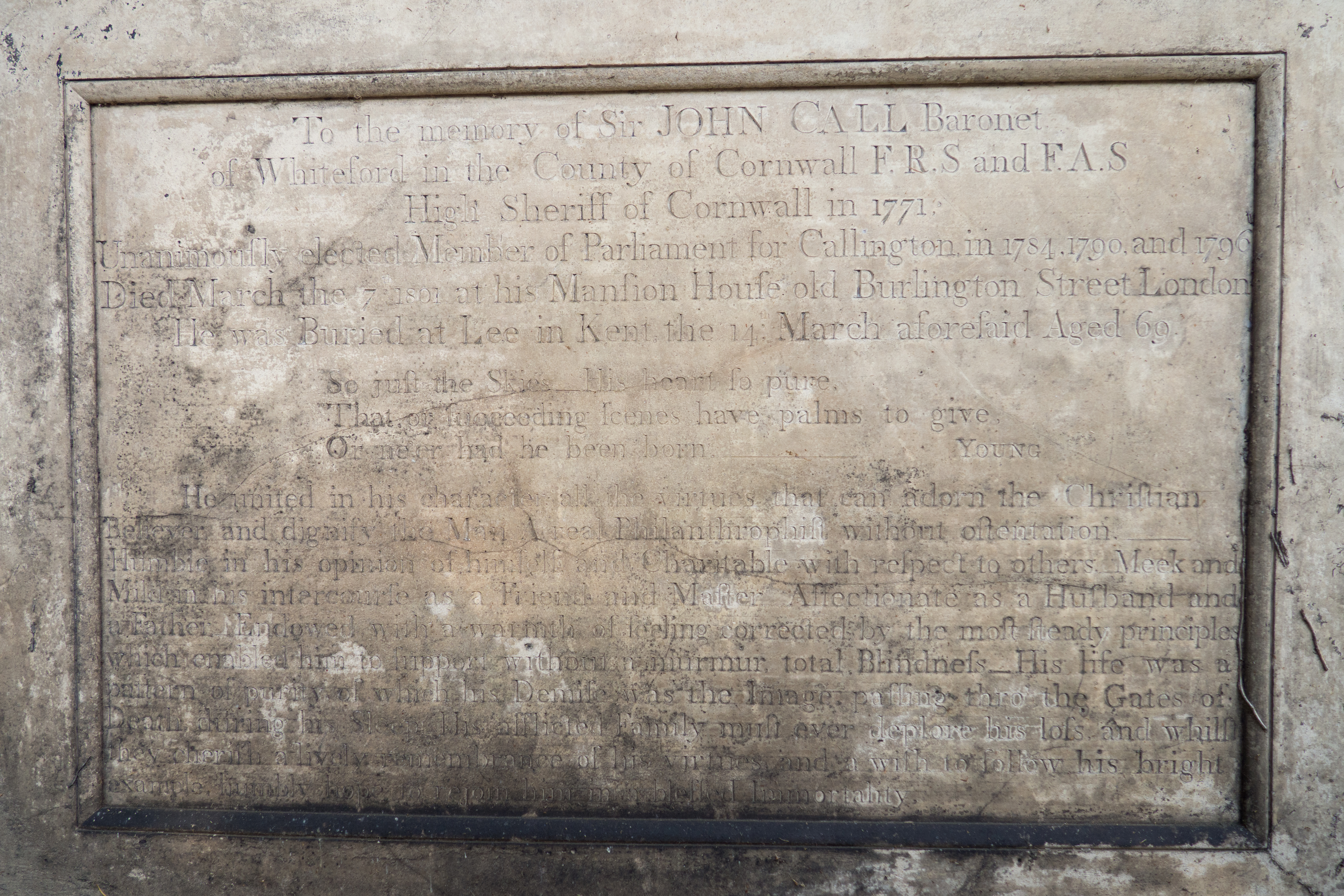
Inscription on Monument of Sir John Call Bart, Lee Old Churchyard

He married Philadelphia, the daughter and coheiress of William Batty of Kingston upon Thames; they had two sons and four daughters. His eldest son, William Pratt Call, succeeded him, becoming the 2nd Baronet Call on his father's death in 1801. He became blind seven years before he died, of apoplexy, at his home in Old Burlington Street, London, and was buried at St Margaret's old churchyard, Lee, Kent (now in the borough of Lewisham), where there is a grade II* listed monument to his memory.

Baronetage of Great Britain
New creation	Baronet (of Whiteford); 1791–1801	Succeeded by William Call
