= Whiteford House =

Country house in Cornwall, England

Coordinates: 50.546°N 4.316°W

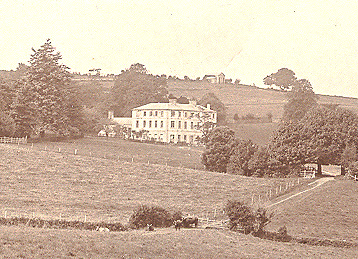
Whiteford House

Whiteford House was an English country house near Stoke Climsland, Cornwall. It was built in 1775 by John Call and demolished in 1913.

== History ==
There had been a house at Whiteford since around the 13th century, owned by various families. The estate was sold to John Call in 1763. His son, also named John, became High Sheriff of Cornwall in 1771, and built Whiteford House in 1775 after returning from working in the East India Company. It was described as having "a handsome front" and as well as being lavishly designed, the house included a "looking-glass room" where a post boy was reportedly held prisoner by a parlour maid.

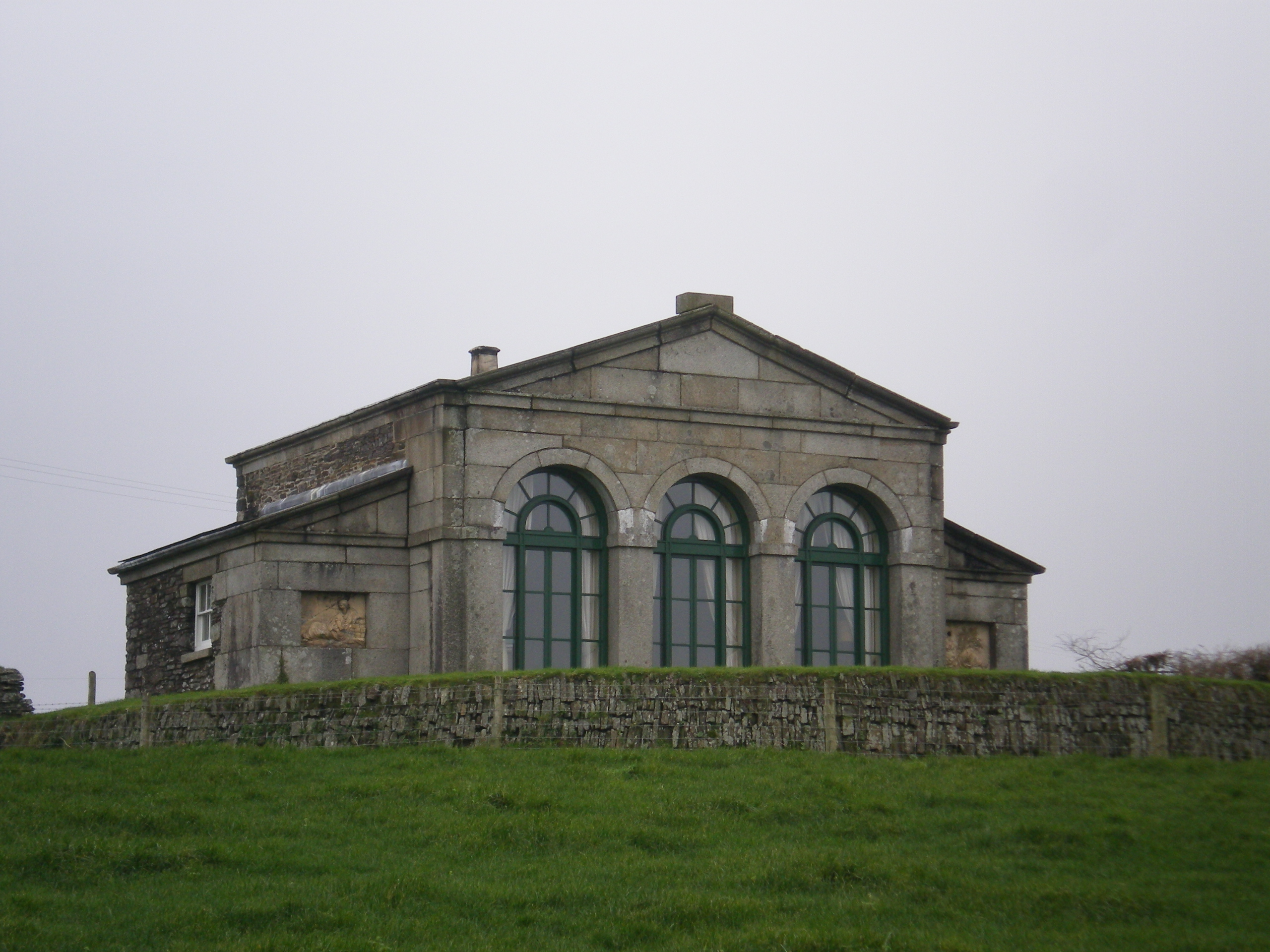
The garden folly has survived as Whiteford Temple and is now rented by the Landmark Trust to holidaymakers.

Little of the house survives. Some fragments are incorporated in the house of the agent of the home farm, i.e. a Tuscan Doric porch and some tripartite windows. (Note: Pevsner (writing in 1950) notes the existence of an outbuilding divided into cottages, the stables with cupola and wings, a ghost of the layout of the grounds, a bridge and the garden temple "now a cattle byre".) Call's descendants retained ownership of the house until 1870. The estate was briefly owned by the Montague family before being sold to the Prince of Wales in 1879 and the mansion was converted into an office for the Duchy of Cornwall, who sold off all its contents and furnishings for a pittance.

The main house was demolished in 1913 while still in the ownership of the Duchy and some of the stone was used to build the nearby Duchy College. The stables and a garden folly survive, and the folly (called Whiteford Temple) survive, and Whiteford Temple is now owned by the Landmark Trust and let as a holiday cottage. There are Coade stone plaques on the exterior of the Temple.

From 2001 until 2012, the grounds of Whiteford House hosted the Whiteford Music Festival.
