= Wivelshire =

Ancient administrative units of Cornwall, England

Coordinates: 50.457°N 4.444°W

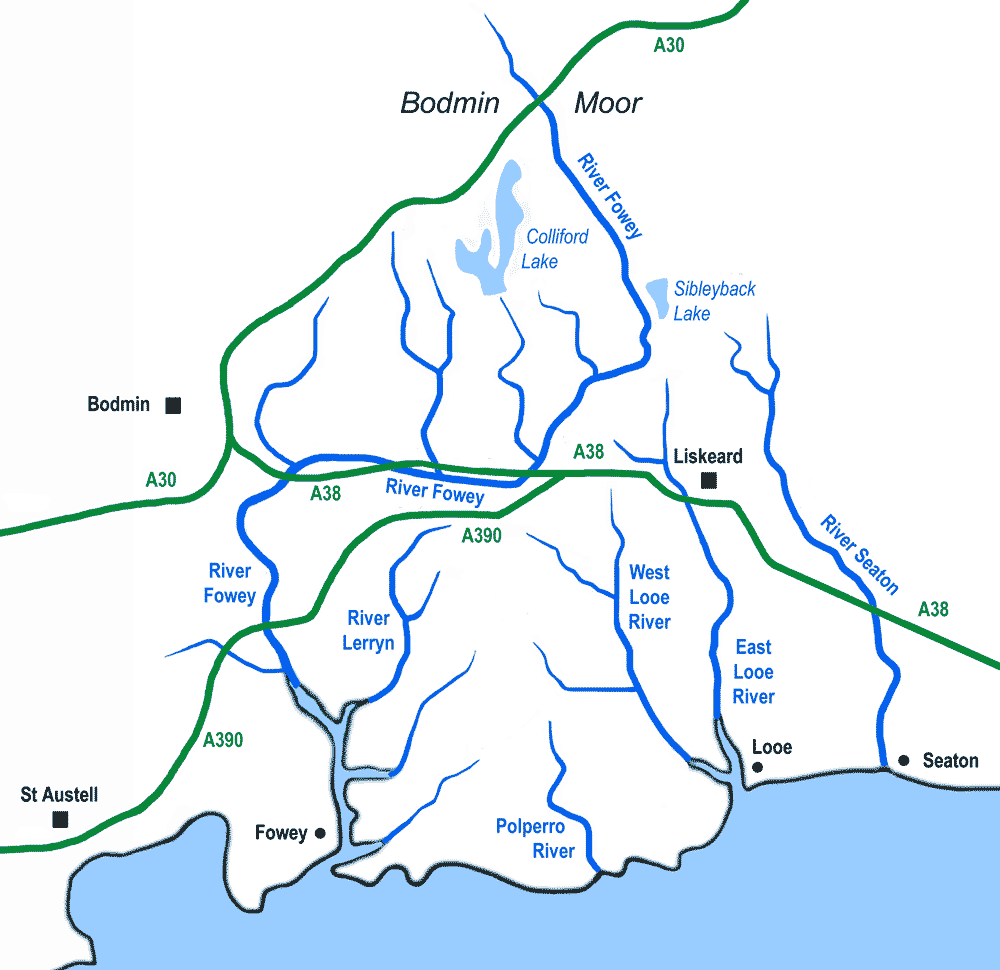
Sketchmap of the Looe rivers

East Wivelshire and West Wivelshire (usually known merely as East and West) are two of the ancient Hundreds of Cornwall.

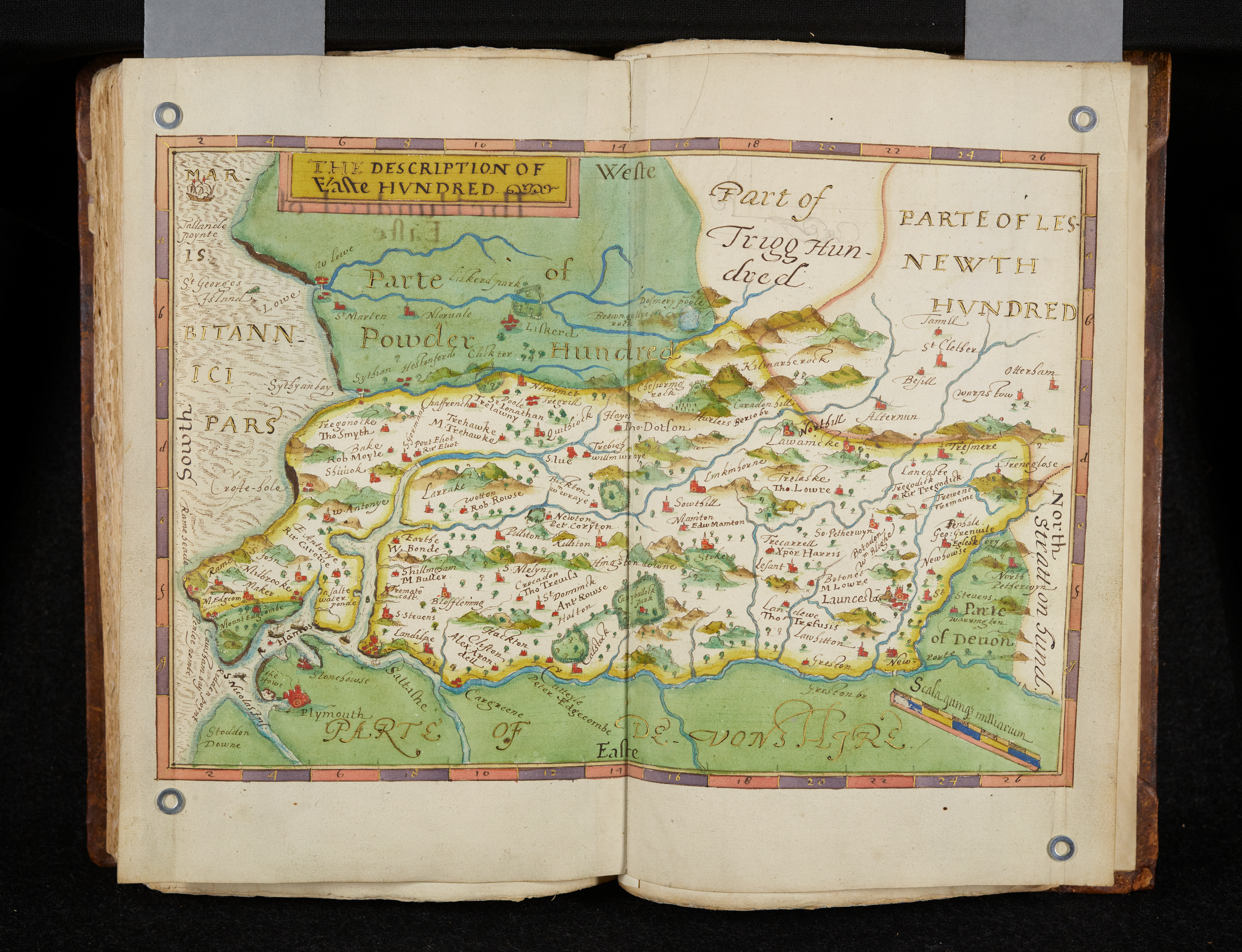
Norden's map of East Hundred.

East and West (Wivelshire) must have originally had a Cornish name but it is not recorded. The name of nearby Lostwithiel has the second element gwydhyow meaning 'trees'; wivel may also be from the Anglo-Saxon personal name Wifel. There are also Anglican deaneries by the same names, but the modern boundaries do not correspond exactly. The area must have formed one hundred originally but had already been divided into two before the Norman Conquest: they are grouped in Domesday under the head manors of Rillaton (East) and Fawton (West). The Cornish names are Ryslegh (East) and Fawy (West). However the suggestion that 'the area must have formed one hundred originally' is disputed by the noted Cornish historian, the Rev. W. M. M. Picken, who believes the names to be derived from the Saxon twi-feald-scir, meaning 'two-fold shire.' The 'invariable prefixing of the words East or West ... explains what has happened to the initial letter t' (A Medieval Cornish Miscellany, by W. M. M. Picken, edited by O. J. Padel, Chichester, 2000.)

== Civil parishes ==
=== East Wivelshire ===
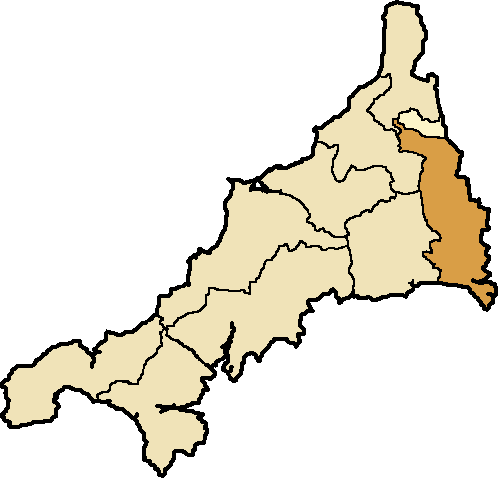
East Wivelshire

Antony St Jacob, Botus Fleming, Callington, Calstock, Egloskerry, Landulph, Landrake [with St Erney], Laneast, Launceston St Mary Magdalene, Lawhitton, Lewannick, Lezant, Linkinhorne, Maker, St Mellion, Menheniot, North Hill, Pillaton, Quethiock, Rame, Sheviock, South Hill, South Petherwin, St Germans, St John, St Stephens-with-Newport, Stoke Climsland, St Dominick, St Ive, St Stephen-by-Saltash, St Thomas Apostle-by-Launceston, Tremaine, Tresmeer, Trewen

=== West Wivelshire ===
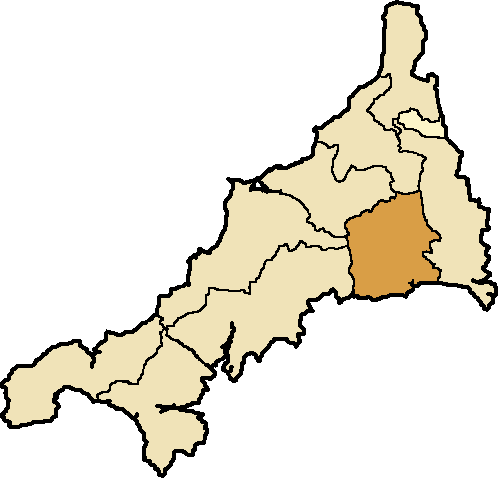
West Wivelshire

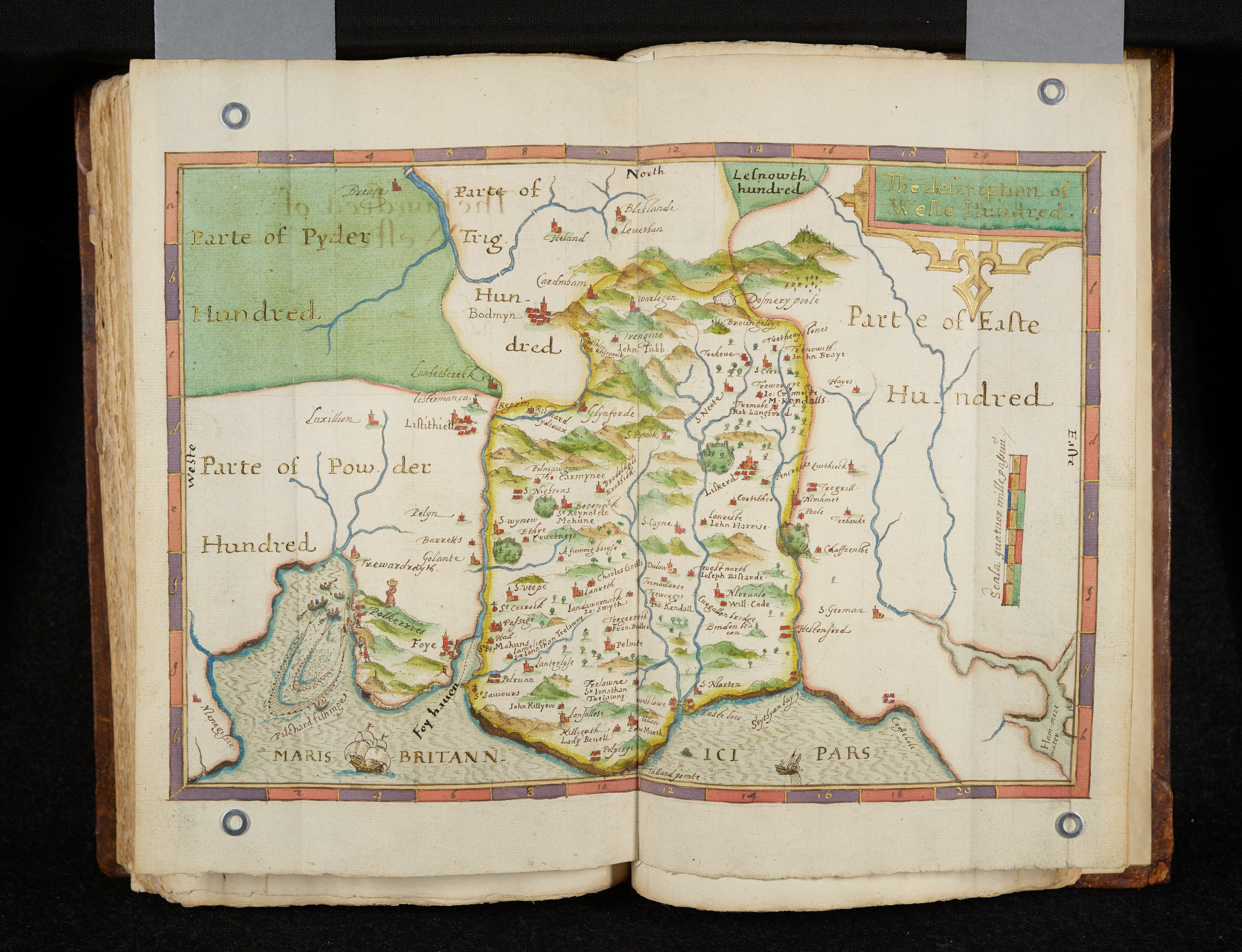
Norden's Map of West Hundred.

Boconnoc, Braddock [Broadoak], Cardinham, St Cleer, Duloe, St Keyne, Lanreath, Lansallos, Lanteglos by Fowey, Liskeard, St Martin-by-Looe, Morval, St Neot, Pelynt, St Pinnock, Talland, St Veep, Warleggan, St Winnow
