= Lewannick =

Village in Cornwall, England

Coordinates: 50.601°N 4.438°W

Lewannick: Cornish: Lannwennek
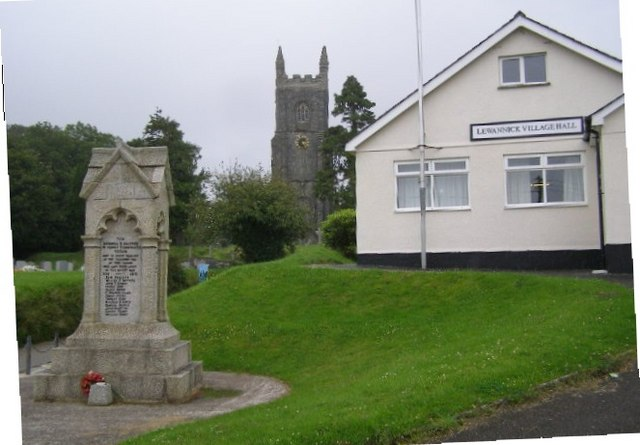
- Lewannick Village Hall, War Memorial & St. Martin's Church

- Location within Cornwall
- Population: 970 (United Kingdom Census 2011)
- OS grid reference: SX276807
- Civil parish: Lewannick
- Unitary authority: Cornwall
- Ceremonial county: Cornwall
- Region: South West
- Country: England
- Sovereign state: United Kingdom
- Post town: LAUNCESTON
- Postcode district: PL15
- Dialling code: 01566
- Police: Devon and Cornwall
- Fire: Cornwall
- Ambulance: South Western
- UK Parliament: North Cornwall

Lewannick (/luˈɒnɪk/; Cornish: Lannwennek) is a civil parish and village in Cornwall, England, United Kingdom. The village is situated approximately five miles (8 km) southwest of Launceston. The civil parish had a population of 973 at the 2011 census.

The parish is rural in character and is within the Deanery and Hundred of East. It is bounded on the north by Trewen and South Petherwin, on the east by Lezant, on the south by North Hill and on the west by Altarnun. The parish church is dedicated to St Martin and is located at grid reference SX 2759 8071.

== History ==
Evidence of early medieval habitation at Lewannick is in the form of two inscribed pillar stones, each having text in both Latin and ogham characters; on the basis of the ogham text, these stones have been dated as having been inscribed between the fifth and sixth centuries. One is located in the village churchyard, and was dedicated to a "Ingenuus"; the other has been moved inside to the church nave, and both texts mention an "Ulcagnus".

Two miles south-west, in the valley of the River Lynher, are the fragmentary remains of the medieval Upton Castle.

Arthur Langdon (1896) records two Cornish crosses in the parish: one is Holloway Cross at a road junction one and a half miles north of the churchtown; the other is a cross head in the grounds of a house called Trelaske. Trelaske was a country house until it was demolished in the 1950s.

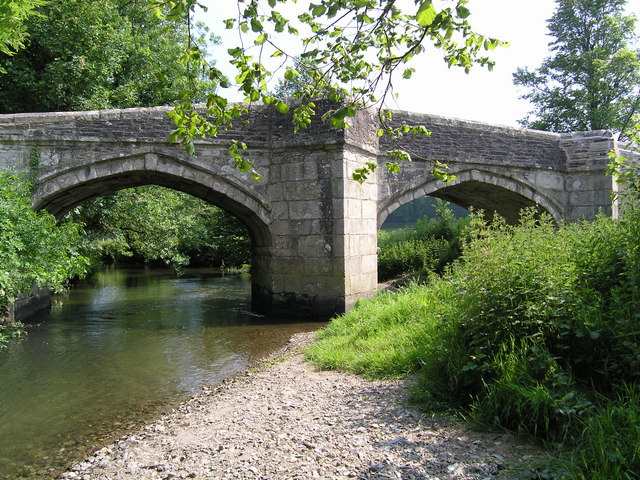
Trekelland Bridge

Trekelland Bridge is a Grade II* listed road bridge over the River Inny probably built in 1504. This may be the bridge near Launceston for which Bishop Oldham issued an indulgence in 1504. It has two large arches and a smaller arch and is built of granite ashlar. It is one of the best-preserved and most beautiful of Cornish medieval bridges.

== Cornish wrestling ==
Cornish wrestling tournaments, for prizes, were held in Lewannick in the 1800s. Venues included Trelaske Manor.

== Notable residents ==
- Annie Hearn, poisoner and her victims Mary and Minnie Everard and Alice Thomas
