= Chapelry =

Subdivision of an ecclesiastical parish in England

A chapelry was a subdivision of an ecclesiastical parish in England and parts of Lowland Scotland up to the mid 19th century.

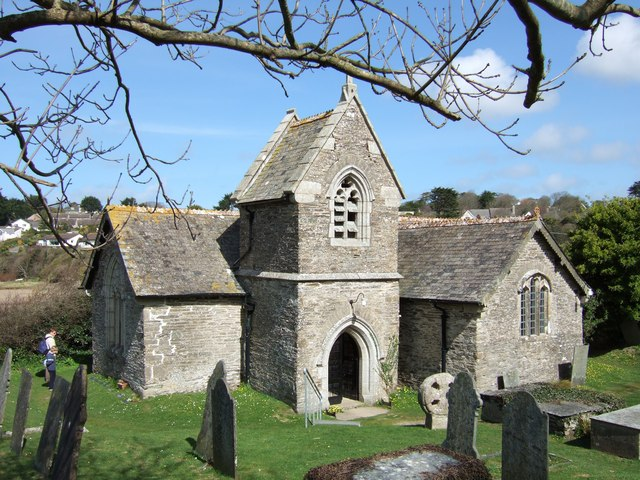
St Michael's church, Porthilly, Cornwall

== Status ==
A chapelry had a similar status to a township, but was so named as it had a chapel of ease (chapel) which was the community's official place of assembly in religious and secular matters. The fusion of these matters – principally tithes – was heavily tied to the main parish church. However, the medieval church's doctrine of subsidiarity when the congregation or sponsor was wealthy enough, supported their constitution into new parishes.

Chapelries were first widespread in northern England and in larger parishes across the country which had populous outlying places. Except in cities, the parishes (with 686 extra-parochial areas) were fixed in medieval times by reference to a large or influential manor or a set of manors. A lord of the manor or other patron of an area, often the Diocese, would for prestige and public convenience set up an additional church of sorts, a chapel of ease which would serve the chapelry: typically an area roughly equal to the old extent of the manor or a new industrious area.

The chapels, as opposed to mission churches or mission rooms, had a date of consecration, dedication to a saint or saints, and typically their own clergy. They were by and large upgraded, that is (re-)constituted, into parishes. A small minority fell redundant and were downgraded or closed, though at a lesser rate than mission rooms, which were usually cheaply built and declined after the invention of different modes of private wheeled transport.

The vestry, whether a joint board with the whole parish or dedicated in each chapelry, was empowered under an Act of Parliament in the reign of Henry VIII to collect rates to improve the roads, other general purposes, and administer the Poor Law (e.g. indoor and outdoor relief, the Speenhamland system and other wages systems) until the establishment of Poor Law Unions in the 19th century. The Poor Law Amendment Act 1867 declared that all areas that levied a separate rate should become civil parishes; thus their number approximately equalled the sum of ecclesiastical parishes and chapelries. Civil parishes have been abolished in many urban areas, removing the third tier of British local government.

== Illustrated examples ==
=== Middlesex ===
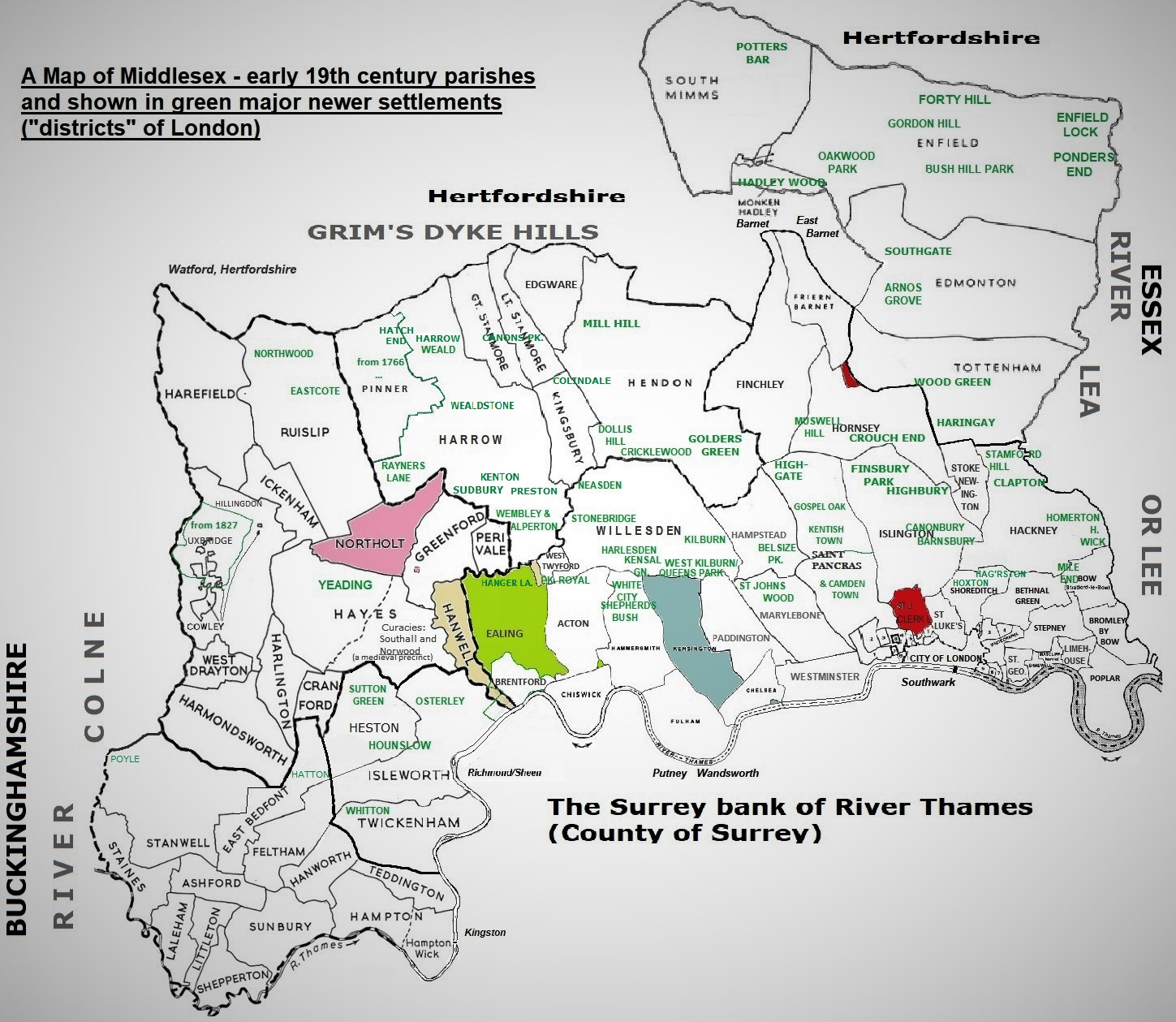
In Middlesex many of the newer settlements, shown in green, became briefly chapelries and rapidly were constituted as new churches

Pinner, Harrow and New Brentford, Hanwell were medieval-founded chapelries in Middlesex, constituted parishes in 1766 and 1660 respectively. Equally Old Brentford, as part of a further parish, Ealing, unusually so for a medieval town.

From the outset the townspeople of New Brentford, founded around St Lawrence's Hospital in the manorial land of Boston Manor in 1179, were "to worship at Hanwell on the four principal feasts and to be buried there", except "the infirm, chaplains, and their servants". Offerings, tithes (but a smaller portion after c. 1660) and an annual donation of wax went from the "curate/curacy" (dubbed sometimes the chaplain) to the rector, namely the parish priest, of Hanwell. Around 1660 New Brentford, already governed by its own vestry, was made a separate parish. In 1714 the rector of Hanwell managed to assert his right to the hay tithes from Boston manorial demesne but in 1744 he gave up the small tithes of New Brentford, all hay tithes except those from Boston demesne, and all offerings. In 1961 the parish of St. Lawrence, New Brentford, was amalgamated with St. George's and St. Paul's, Old Brentford, to form the united parishes of Brentford in the Church of England.

=== Cornwall ===
In Cornwall the parish of St Minver had chapelries of Porthilly and St Enodoc; Probus had chapelries of Cornelly and Merther and there were others. St Ives was a chapelry of Lelant before it was granted parochial status (until 1902 Towednack was also a chapelry of Lelant). Though St Agnes had a majority of the population it remained a chapelry of Perranzabuloe until 1846. South Petherwin had chapelries of Trewen and Launceston (St Mary Magdalene).
