= Launceston Guildhall and Town Hall =

Municipal building in Launceston, Cornwall, England

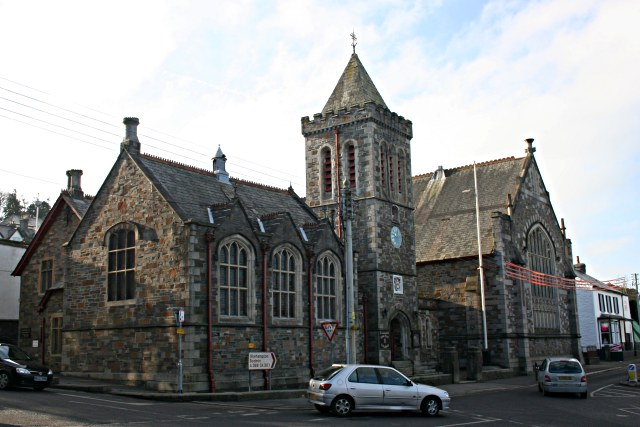
- Launceston Guildhall (left) and Town Hall (right)

- Shown in Cornwall
- 50.6360°N 4.3625°W
- Location: Launceston, Cornwall, England

History
- Built: 1887

Site notes
- Architect(s): Otho B. Peter and G. Hine
- Architectural style: Gothic style

Listed Building – Grade II
- Official name: The Guildhall and Town House with attached Coach House
- Designated: 10 December 1992
- Reference no.: 1297841

Launceston Guildhall and Town Hall is a municipal building in Western Road in Launceston, Cornwall, England. The building, which was the meeting place of Launceston Town Council, is a Grade II listed building.

== History ==
The county assizes had been held the town since 1201. Latterly, the venue for this was the old guildhall which was a medieval timber building that accommodated both the nisi prius court and the crown court. It stood at the corner of Broad Street and High Street in the town centre and was completed in 1647. However, after the assizes moved to the new Shire Hall in Bodmin in 1838, the old guildhall was no longer required and it was demolished in 1840.

After holding meetings for around 30 years in a hall which they shared with St Mary Magdalene's Church, civic leaders decided to procure a dedicated guildhall: the site they selected was open land to the south of Launceston Castle. The foundation stone for the new guildhall was laid on 30 September 1881. It was designed in the Gothic style and completed in late 1883. The design for the guildhall involved a symmetrical main frontage with three bays facing onto Western Road; each bay contained a three-light stained glass arched window with a gable above. Internally, it had an arch-braced ceiling and became lined with paintings and photographs of former mayors.

The foundation stone for the new town hall was laid by the Lord Chancellor, Lord Halsbury, on 30 September 1886. It was designed by Otho B. Peter and G. Hine in the Gothic style and completed in 1887. The design included a three-stage tower above the main entrance: the tower connected on the left to the guildhall and on the right the new town hall, which itself featured a large seven-light window with a tall gable facing Western Road. The town's coat of arms was subsequently displayed above the doorway in the tower.

In 1921 a clock with two quarter-jacks was installed in the tower by Potts & Sons. The clock already had a long history, prior to its installation in the tower, having originally been made by John Thwaites of Clerkenwell in 1803 and installed at Hexworthy House. The quarter-jacks are much older, they are believed to date from 1642. At some stage both they and the clock were transferred to the old guildhall on the corner of Broad Street and the High Street, and when that was demolished they were installed in a turret atop the Butter Market building (which was built in its place). The Butter Market was itself demolished in 1920, making way for the town war memorial; whereupon the decision was taken to install the clock in the tower of the present-day Guildhall and Town Hall. Potts added a new quarter-chime train to the mechanism and a more modern escapement before installing it in the tower, since when it has continued to drive the clock. The two quarter-jacks are located in a niche halfway up the tower, where they continue to chime the quarter-hours.

The complex served as the headquarters of Launceston Borough Council but ceased to be the local seat of government when the enlarged North Cornwall District Council was formed in 1974. It subsequently became the meeting place of Launceston Town Council. The guildhall and town hall were both extensively refurbished in 2010. Works of art in the complex include a portrait by Anthony van Dyck of King Charles I with M. de St Antoine, a portrait by Thomas Lawrence of the Recorder of Launceston, Hugh Percy, 2nd Duke of Northumberland, and a portrait by Tennyson Cole of the journalist, Sir Alfred Robbins.
