= James Ruse =

Cornish-Australian convict and agriculturalist (1759–1837)

- Born: 9 August 1759; Launceston, Cornwall, England, UK
- Died: 5 September 1837 (aged 78); Campbelltown, New South Wales, Australia
- Occupation: Farmer
- Years active: 1789−1836
- Spouse(s): Susannah Norcott, Elizabeth Perry
- Children: Elizabeth (1779−1779), Richard (1780−1840), Rebecca (1791−1792), James (1793−1866), Elizabeth (1794−1875), Susannah (1796−1872), Mary (1798−1871).
- Parent(s): Richard Ruse, Elizabeth Curne

James Ruse (9 August 1759 – 5 September 1837) was a Cornish farmer who, at age 23, was convicted of burglary and was sentenced to seven years' transportation. He arrived at Sydney Cove, New South Wales, on the First Fleet with 18 months of his sentence remaining. Ruse applied to Colony Governor Arthur Phillip for a land grant, stating that he had been bred for farming. Governor Phillip, desperate to make the colony self-sufficient, allocated Ruse an allotment at Rose Hill (now Rosehill, near Parramatta), where he proved himself industrious and showed that it was possible for a family to survive in New South Wales through farming. Ruse received a land grant, from which he grew and sold 600 bushels of wheat 30 acres (120,000 m^{2}). Ruse was the recipient of the first land grant in New South Wales. Ruse would later exchange the Rose Hill grant for more fertile land on the Hawkesbury River later in his life; after almost losing his farm and thus going bankrupt because of flooding, Ruse found work as a seaman, and later, a farm overseer.

== Early life ==
James Ruse was born at Launceston, Cornwall, England on 9 August 1759. He was baptised on 26 August at Lawhitton.

In 1782, he was tried at the Cornwall Assizes and sentenced to death for "seriously breaking and entering the dwelling house of Thomas Olive and stealing thereout 2 silver watches and other goods". He was reprieved and sentenced to transportation for seven years. He was sent on the Scarborough, one of the First Fleet, and arrived in Australia on 22 January 1788.

== Pioneering farmer ==
In 1789, Ruse produced the first successful corn harvest in New South Wales. That harvest failed to yield sufficient corn to make flour for the colony, but Ruse produced enough seeds for the next year's crop, which was successful. Such was the colony's need for a food supply that Governor Phillip rewarded Ruse for his success with the first land grant made in New South Wales, along with a gift of pigs and chickens. In February 1791, Ruse declared to the authorities that he was self-sufficient, and two months later, in March, he was granted a further 30 acres.

In 1794, Ruse moved further out, to the junction of the Hawkesbury River with South Creek, where he operated a less successful farm. Later, his source of income was wiped out by flooding, which was always a risk involved with farming in the Hawkesbury. Ruse seems to have been away from his family for some time and it has been assumed that he went to sea at the same time that he had his son James the younger indentured to Kable and Underwood. This left his wife, Elizabeth to take care of the family on her own. During this period, she had two children with convict James Kiss. These children were Ann Ruse Kiss (b. 1801) and William James Ruse Kiss (1806−1853). James Ruse was heavily in debt and it is suggested that the hard work of his wife Elizabeth saved him from bankruptcy. Elizabeth is shown in the records as supplying crops to the stores in her own right.

From 1828, James was employed as an overseer of Denham Court. In 1836, James Ruse and James Kiss were received into the Catholic church together. Ruse died at Campbelltown on 5 September 1837 and is buried with wife Elizabeth and daughter Mary.

Ruse's gravestone, parts of which he carved himself, reads:

"Gloria in Axcelsis

SACRED TO THE MEMEREY OF JAMES RUSE WHO DEPARTED THIS LIFE SEPT. 5TH IN THE YEAR OF HOURE LORD 1837 NATEF OF CORNWELL AND ARIVED IN THIS COLENEY BY THE FIRST FLEET AGED 78

MY MOTHER REREAD ME TENDERELY WITH ME SHE TOCK MUCH PAINES AND WHEN I ARIVED IN THIS COELNEY I SOWD THE FORST GRAIN AND NOW WITH MY HEVENLY FATHER I HOPE

FOR EVER TO REMAIN"

== Family life ==
James Ruse married Susannah Norcott in South Petherwin, Cornwall, in 1779. They had one daughter, Elizabeth (1779−1779) and one son, Richard (1781−1842).

After being transported for his crime and creating a new life in New South Wales, Ruse married fellow convict Elizabeth Parry (1769 – 27 May 1836) on 5 September 1790. They had five children together – Rebecah (1791−1792), James (1793−1866), Elizabeth (1794−1875), Susannah (1796 – 1872), and Mary (1798−1871).

Although the family history of James Ruse is well-documented, historical records never identified the parents of Ann Ruse Kiss (b. 1801) and William James Ruse Kiss (1806−1853), who were believed to have been adopted by the Ruse family. In 2019, genetic testing of their descendants indicated that they were in fact the children of Elizabeth Ruse and James Kiss. It is unknown whether James Ruse was aware of Kiss' involvement with Elizabeth.

== Legacy ==
The memory of James Ruse is perpetuated in the naming of key locations in Sydney, including James Ruse Agricultural High School in Carlingford; James Ruse Drive, running from Granville to Northmead, near Parramatta; and Ruse, a suburb in southwest Sydney.

A replica of his tombstone stands in the front garden of Barrengarry House, the administration block at James Ruse Agricultural High School. The original headstone, carved by Ruse himself, was moved by his descendants to a secure location after vandals damaged some headstones in the Old St Johns cemetery at Campbelltown. The headstone is now in the care of the Campbelltown and Airds Historical Society at Glenalvon House in Lithgow Street, Campbelltown.

In 1980, the Cornish folk singer Brenda Wootton wrote and recorded the song "James Ruse" which uses as a chorus the last four lines of the headstone's inscription.

== See also ==
- List of convicts transported to Australia
