= St Mary Magdalene's Church, Launceston =

Coordinates: 50°38′17.04″N 4°21′35.76″W

St Mary Magdalene’s Church, Launceston
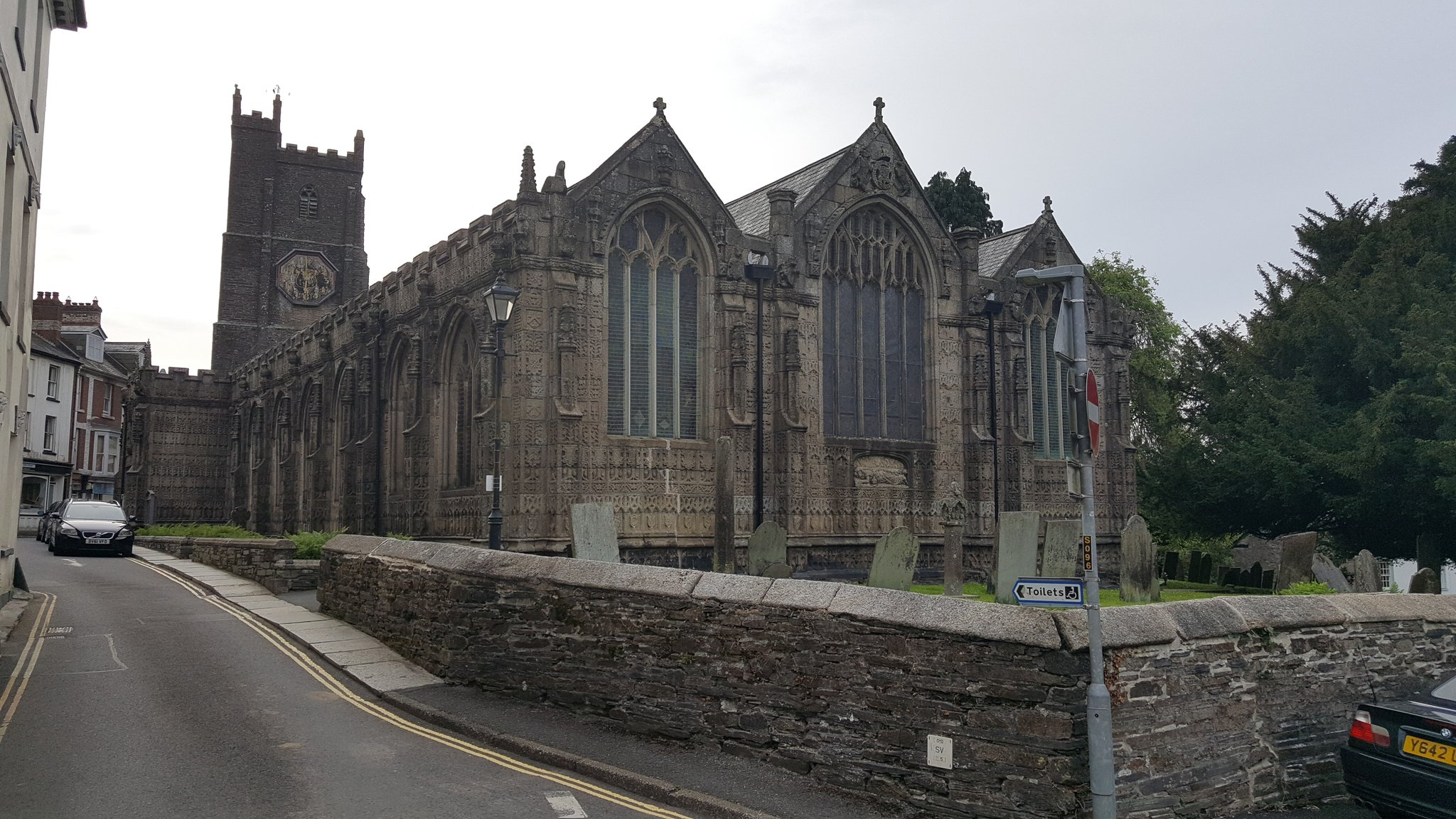
- St Mary Magdalene’s Church, Launceston
- St Mary Magdalene’s Church, Launceston
- OS grid reference: SX 33208 84675
- Location: Launceston
- Country: England
- Denomination: Church of England
- Churchmanship: Broad church

History
- Dedication: St Mary Magdalene

Architecture
- Groundbreaking: 1511
- Completed: 1524

Administration
- Province: Province of Canterbury
- Diocese: Diocese of Truro
- Archdeaconry: Bodmin
- Deanery: Trigg Major
- Parish: Launceston
- Location within Cornwall

Listed Building – Grade I
- Official name: Church of St Mary Magdalene
- Designated: 27 February 1950
- Reference no.: 1280301

St Mary Magdalene's Church, Launceston is a Grade I listed parish church in the Church of England in Launceston, Cornwall. It is unusual for its carvings; the entire exterior of the original part of the church is built of carved granite blocks. The church is dedicated to Jesus' companion, Mary Magdalene.

== History ==
The origins of the church date from the 12th century, but all except for the tower has been replaced. The church was under the management of Launceston Priory.

The current building, except for the tower, dates from 1511 to 1524 and was built by Sir Henry Trecarrel of Trecarrel as a memorial to his infant son.

After the dissolution of Launceston Priory in 1539 the management transferred to the Corporation who took on the responsibility of appointing curates and repairs to the building. Around 1550, the lead work needed repair, and the Corporation employed a plumber to recast and relay it. In 1640 the Mayor paid for new glass for the church windows.

In 1718 a west end gallery was built to increase the accommodation available at services. Iron railings were purchased in 1809 from the Tavistock Foundry, at a cost of £222 8s. 3d. (equivalent to £15,500 in 2025). Following an appeal for scrap metal, the iron railings were removed at the start of the Second World War.

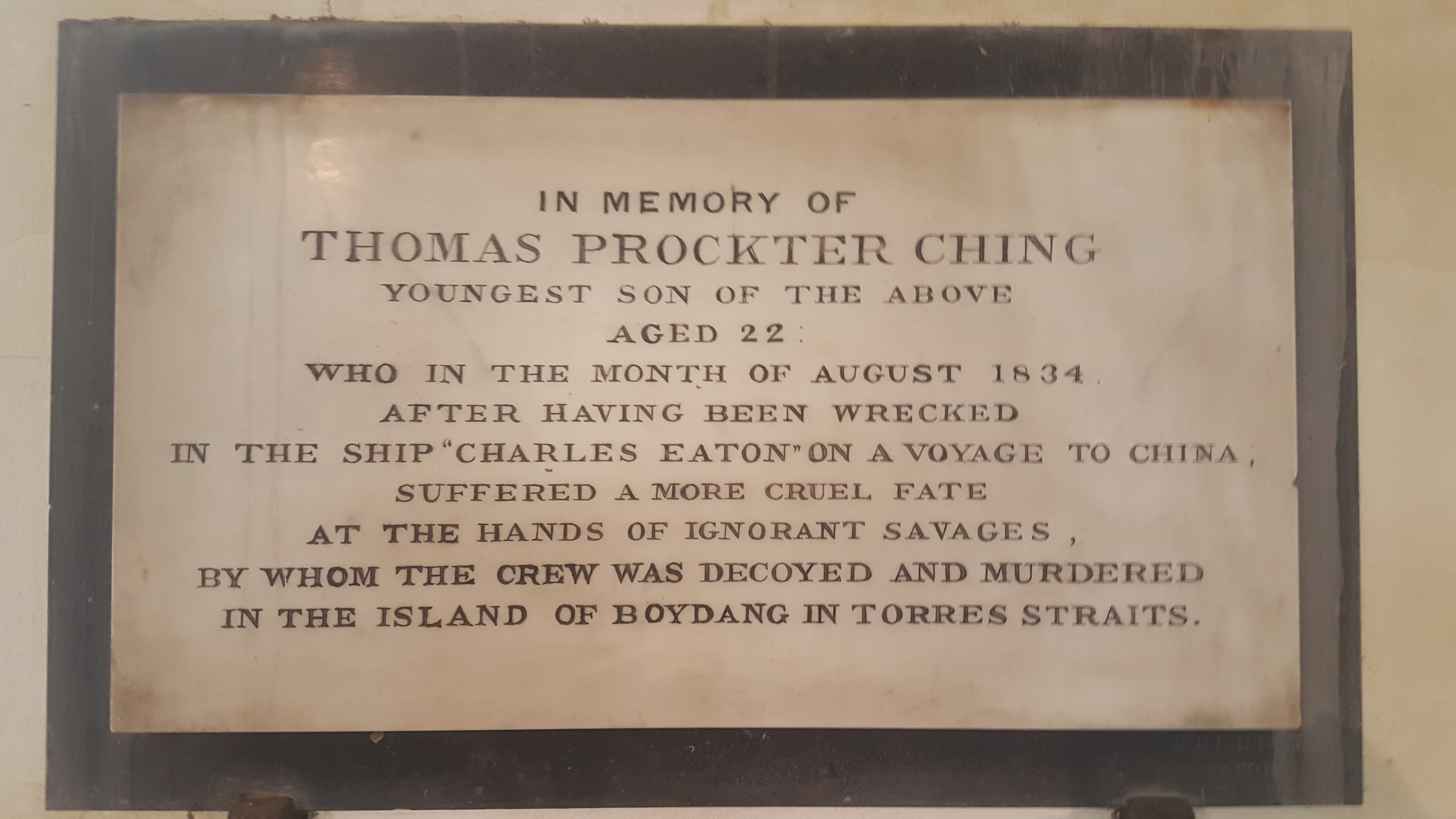
Memorial to Thomas Prockter Ching who served as midshipman on the ill fated Charles Eaton which was shipwrecked off Boydang Island in the Torres Straits.

In 1852 the pillars of the church were straightened and the roof was replaced. The plans for the work were prepared by D. Barton Esq, and the contact undertaken by Messrs Gill and Ede, builders of Launceston. The organ was dismantled and cleaned by two local townsmen, Messrs Geake and Lane. The church re-opened for worship on 28 December 1852 in the presence of the Mayor, Justices and other members of the corporation.

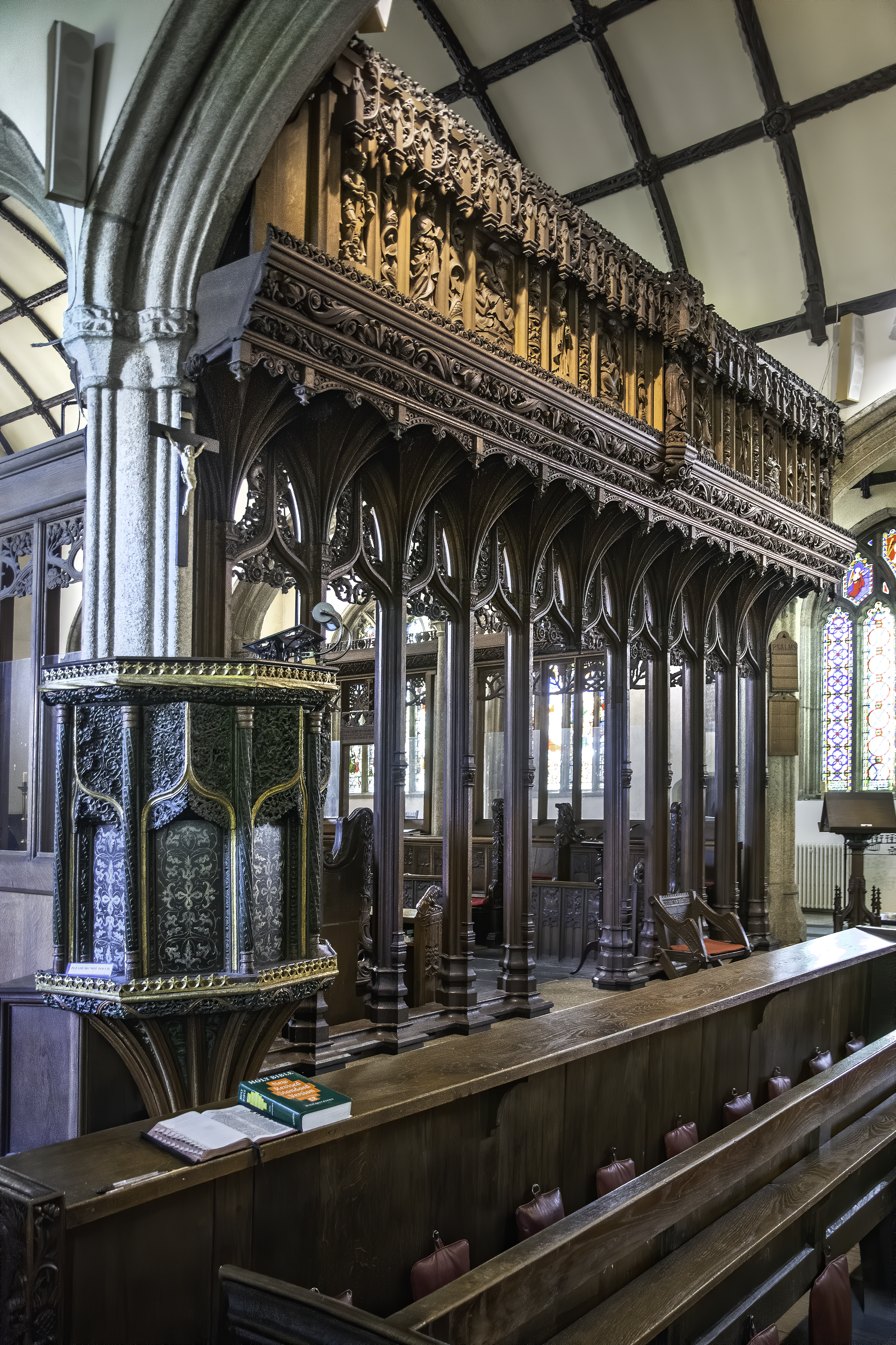
Launceston St Mary Magdalene Pulpit and Gothic Rood Screen by the Pinwill sisters

It was restored in 1894 at a cost of £3,000 (equivalent to £337,100 in 2025) under the plans of John Dando Sedding, but he died before the work could be carried out, and it was managed by Edmund Harold Sedding and Henry Wilson. A side chapel was added to the south aisle of the church. New seating was provided in the north and south aisles, and oak benches provided for the centre aisles. New choirs stalls were also provided, wood carving was done by Charles Trask and Sons, Stoke-under-Ham, Illminster. Stonework was done by William Burt of Newport, Launceston.

The organ was moved to its present location in 1904. The gallery was taken down in 1910. A new chancel screen 15 feet (4.6 m) high and 20 feet (6.1 m) wide by Rashleigh Pinwill of Plymouth was dedicated in 1911 to mark the 400th anniversary of the church. It cost £600.

=== Vicars ===
- 1622 John Sainthill
- 1630 Jasper Hicks
- 1633 Edward Cubbins
- 1637 William Crompton
- 1648 Joseph Hull
- 1656 William Oliva
- 1663 John Ruddle
- 1699 Nathaniel Boughton
- 1715 William Bedford
- 1737 Charles Bedford
- 1763 John Bedford
- 1787 William Carpenter
- 1808 John Rowe
- 1837 George Buckmaster Gibbons
- 1866 Wickham Montgomery
- 1880 Samuel William Elderfield Bird
- 1883 John Benson Sidgwick
- 1890 Thomas Jackson Nunns
- 1907 Frank Ernest Lewis
- 1919 Norman Archibald Rivers-Tippett
- 1936 William Harrison Rigg
- 1945 W. George Steer

== Organ ==
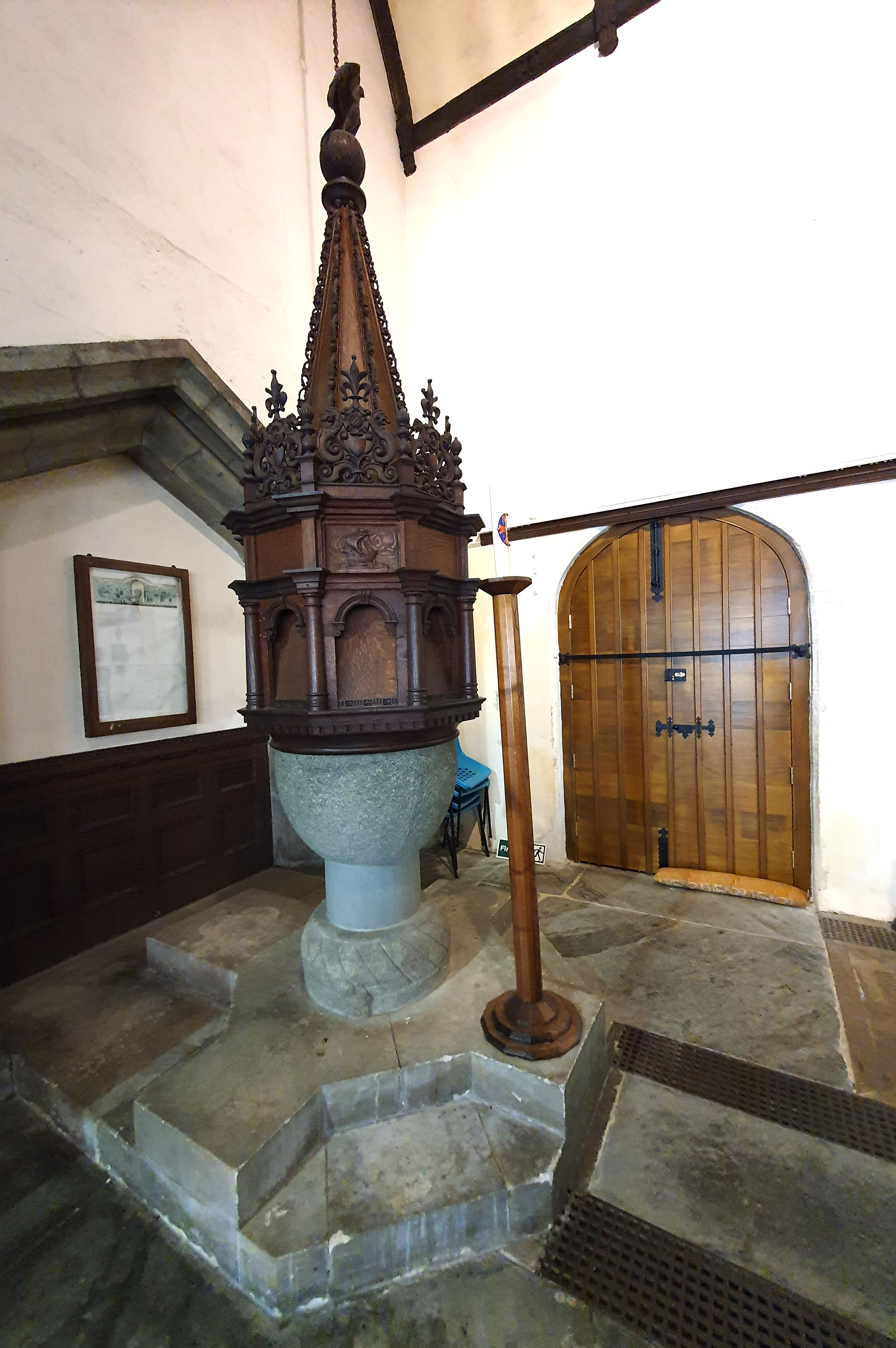
The font with its wooden cover

The church has had organs since before the English Civil War. An organ was installed in 1723, probably by Thomas Swarbrick. The donor was either Sir William Morice, 3rd Baronet (1707–1750) or his successor Humphry Morice MP (1723–1785). This has had numerous modifications over the years. A specification of the organ can be found on the National Pipe Organ Register.

=== Organists ===
- Robert Martin ca.1760 - 1800
- Philip Martin 1800 - 1830
- Thomas Peter Hamlin 1830 - 1871
- Thomas Dalby 1871 - 1898 (Formerly organist at St Wystan's Church, Repton and New Romney, Kent)
- William Clotworthy ???? - 1907 (afterwards organist of St Eustachius' Church, Tavistock)
- David John Coldwell FRCO 1907 - 1943
- Royland Jordan 1945 -

== Bells ==
The tower contains a peal of 8 bells cast by John Taylor & Company of Loughborough in 1938.
