= Annie Hearn =

Arsenic poisoner in England

- Born: Sarah Ann Everard; 1895; Middle Rasen, Lincolnshire, England
- Other names: Sarah Ann Hearn; Annie Faithful
- Occupation: Cook, housekeeper
- Status: Acquitted
- Criminal charge: Murder

Details
- Victims: 3
- Date: 1926–1930
- Weapon: White arsenic
- Date apprehended: February 1931, in Torquay

Annie Hearn (1895–?) was the assumed but known name of an arsenic poisoner in England in the 1920s/30s. Whilst Annie was found not guilty, all modern opinion concludes the weight of evidence would point to her having murdered at least three people.

== Life ==
She was born Sarah Ann Everard in 1895 in Middle Rasen in Lincolnshire to Robert and Betsy Everard. Her father was a gardener and they lived in various places in England. She showed a picture of her late husband "Dr Hearn" but this was later proven to be a picture of one of the Vane-Tempest baronets who was killed in France on 25 March 1917. To the public (and even to her own family) she played the role of a widow who had lost her husband in the First World War. This was quite a normal circumstance in England in the 1920s and would raise no suspicion. She adopted the name Sarah Ann Hearn and was known as Annie Hearn. In 1921 she went to live with her paternal aunt Mary Ann Everard and older sister Minnie Everard at Trenhorne House on the edge of Lewannick in Cornwall. Aunt Mary died in 1926 and Minnie died in the summer of 1930, and both were buried in Lewannick churchyard.

She obtained a post as cook and housekeeper to William (1889–1949) and Alice Thomas (née Parsons) who lived at nearby Trenhorne Farm. She appears to have been obsessed with William Thomas and sought to be his wife. Her affection was not reciprocated but she was on good terms with both husband and wife. They all three travelled to Bude in north Cornwall, around 20 km north of the farm, on 18 October 1930. There in Littlejohn's cafe they ate salmon sandwiches which had been made by Annie at home. They were distributed by Annie. Alice took the top sandwich offered to her, became very ill and started vomiting around two hours later. The local physician Dr Saunders diagnosed food poisoning.

It was later proved that a second dose of arsenic was given to Alice around 27 or 28 October. Desperately ill, she was taken to hospital in Plymouth on 3 November and died on the morning of 4 November.

Annie left Trenhorne House and faked a suicide by leaving a distinctive checked coat on a clifftop at Looe. An inquest into Alice's death concluded she had been murdered by a person or persons unknown by arsenic poisoning. The inquest ordered the exhumation of Annie's sister and aunt and again found arsenic in each. With much media attention the Daily Mail offered a reward of £500 for information on Annie's whereabouts.

Meanwhile, Annie had assumed the new name of Annie Faithful and got a job as cook and housekeeper to the architect Cecil Powell and his wife at Brooksby House in Torquay. A tip off by Cecil himself led police there in February 1931. Feeling some sympathy, he donated his £500 reward to her defence, allowing her to afford an influential advocate.

== The trial ==
Annie was charged with the murder of her sister, Lydia Maria Everard aged 52, and her neighbour, Alice Maud Thomas (known as "Minnie") aged 47. She was not charged with the murder of her aunt (despite arsenic in her body) as there was little evidence, other than odd coincidence.

The trial took place in Cornwall Assizes in Bodmin in June 1931. Dr Eric Wordley and Roche Lynch gave expert witness on the presence of white arsenic in the each body. The eminent Norman Birkett KC acted as defence lawyer. He argued that presence of arsenic was not evidence of arsenic poisoning. A local chemist, Shuker & Reed, gave evidence that they had sold Annie a weedkiller containing white arsenic some four years previously.

The prosecution led by Herbert du Parcq KC argued that Annie's sister, Minnie Everard, had died in July 1930, and had been poisoned slowly by arsenic over a period of 7 months. However this was based on exhumation of the body and defence argued the body was contaminated by natural arsenic levels in the soil.

Despite a large amount of evidence the weight of evidence was largely circumstantial and Annie Hearn was found Not Guilty after an eight-day trial on 23 June much to the disquiet of the public gallery. This conclusion was very much pushed at the jury by Judge Roche who appeared to support the strong defence theory. Minnie's diary, which alleged that she thought Annie was poisoning her, was ruled inadmissible as evidence.

== Aftermath ==
William Thomas was forced to leave due to the level of rumours and returned to his home area of St Germans where he died in December 1949.

Annie went north to live with a younger sister in Yorkshire. It is thought she lived under a further false name.

The poisoned sandwiches that Annie made to kill the woman who she felt stood in her way with William and the suspicious death of her aunt inspired mystery writer Agatha Christie's 1940 novel Sad Cypress.

== Books based on the Case ==
- Arsenic and Mercy Quint by John Rigbey
- The Cornish Widow by Jacqueline Beard
- West Country Murders by Nicola Sly
- Murder by Poison by Nicola Sly
- The Secret Poisoner: A Century of Murder by Linda Stratmann
- The Murders of Annie Hearn: The Poisonings that Inspired Agatha Christie by Jonathan Oates
