= St Thomas the Apostle Rural =

Civil parish in Cornwall, England

Coordinates: 50.629°N 4.408°W

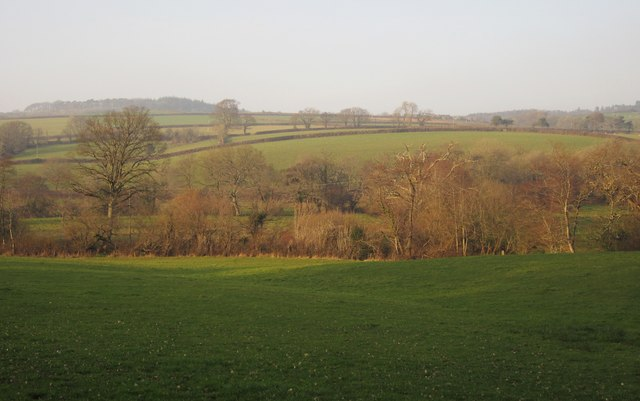
- Valley of the River Kensey

- Location within Cornwall
- Population: 970 (Parish, 2021)
- OS grid reference: SX298838
- Civil parish: St Thomas the Apostle Rural
- Unitary authority: Cornwall
- Ceremonial county: Cornwall
- Region: South West
- Country: England
- Sovereign state: United Kingdom
- Post town: LAUNCESTON
- Postcode district: PL15
- Dialling code: 01566
- Police: Devon and Cornwall
- Fire: Cornwall
- Ambulance: South Western
- UK Parliament: North Cornwall

St Thomas the Apostle Rural is a civil parish in east Cornwall, England, United Kingdom. The modern parish was created in 1894 from the part of the older parish of St Thomas the Apostle, also known as St Thomas-by-Launceston (Cornish: Sen Tommos Lannstefan), which lay outside the borough boundaries of Launceston. The main settlement in the parish today is Tregadillett (Cornish: Tregadylet).

The parish lies to the west of the town of Launceston. It is bounded to the east by Launceston, to the south by South Petherwin, to the west by Trewen, and to the north by Egloskerry and St Stephens by Launceston Rural. At the 2021 census the population of the parish was 970.

== History ==
The area which would become the parish of St Thomas the Apostle was anciently part of the parish of St Stephen, which covered the town of Launceston and extensive surrounding areas. Several chapels of ease were established to serve the town, particularly in light of the parish church at St Stephen's being peripheral to the main urban area after the focus for the town shifted southwards.

Launceston Priory stood just south of the River Kensey, in between the original centre of Launceston around St Stephen's to the north and the newer centre (historically also known as Dunheved) which grew up around the castle to the south. The area south of the Kensey became the parish of Launceston St Mary Magdalene after that former chapel of ease was rebuilt in the early 16th century. Launceston Priory was dissolved in 1539. The former priory church, dedicated to Thomas the Apostle, was retained to serve as another chapel of ease. It was subsequently made a parish church in 1726 and given a parish covering an area south of the Kensey and north of the castle and town centre, and also extending into rural areas to the west of the town.

Part of the parish of St Thomas the Apostle was within the borough boundaries of Launceston from the creation of the parish in 1726. The area within the borough was known as the hamlet of St Thomas Street. Parish functions under the poor laws were administered separately for St Thomas Street and the rest of the parish, and so St Thomas Street became a separate civil parish in 1866 when the legal definition of 'parish' was changed to be the areas used for administering the poor laws. The borough was enlarged in 1889, with further parts of the parish of St Thomas the Apostle being among the areas added to the borough, including the parish church.

The Local Government Act 1894 directed that civil parishes were no longer allowed to straddle borough boundaries, and so the parish was split along the borough boundary. The ecclesiastical parish of St Thomas the Apostle after 1894 therefore straddled three civil parishes: "St Thomas Street" covering the part that was in the borough of Launceston prior to 1889, "St Thomas the Apostle Urban" covering the western fringes of the town that had been added to the borough in 1889, and "St Thomas the Apostle Rural" covering the areas outside the borough. The civil parishes of St Thomas Street and St Thomas the Apostle Urban were abolished in 1922 when all the urban parishes within the borough were united into a single parish called Dunheved, otherwise Launceston.

Despite the fragmentation of the civil parishes, the ecclesiastical parish remains essentially as it was on its creation in 1726, covering the part of Launceston north of the old walled town and south of the Kensey and stretching into the rural areas west of the town.

== Parish church ==
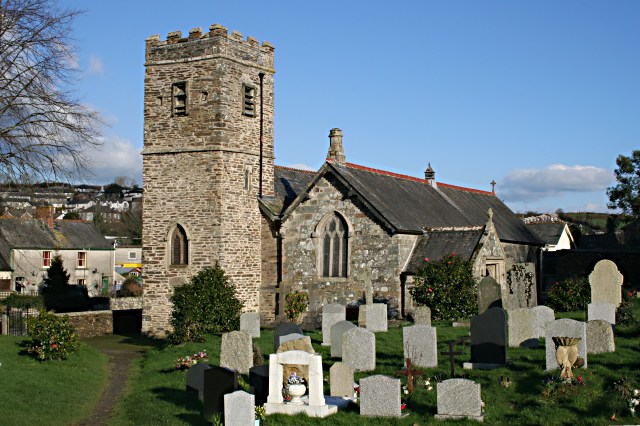
Parish church of St Thomas the Apostle

The original parish church, dedicated to St Thomas, is on the road called Riverside in Launceston at OS Grid Ref SX327850, on the south bank of the River Kensey. It is the church from the former Launceston Priory, also known as St Thomas's Priory, and the ruins of other parts of the priory complex adjoin the church. It is largely of 15th century date, but the lower part of the tower is 14th century: interesting features include a Norman font and tympanum, and two wall paintings. The Norman font is of the Altarnun type and also the largest font in Cornwall. There is a Cornish cross in the churchyard, found when the church was restored and partially rebuilt in 1869-70.

A chapel of ease, dedicated to St Mary the Virgin, is in the village of Tregadillett at OS Grid Ref SX296840.

== Geography ==
The modern civil parish covers a largely rural area to the west of Launceston. The River Kensey forms the northern boundary of the parish, and much of the southern boundary follows the A30 road. At the eastern end of the parish some suburban streets on the edge of Launceston fall within the parish boundary. Trgeadillett is the largest settlement in the civil parish, which also contains several other smaller hamlets and farms, including Trebursye, Kestle, Trevallett and Tredidon. The Hidden Valley Discovery Park is a tourist attraction at Tredidon.

== Tregadillett ==
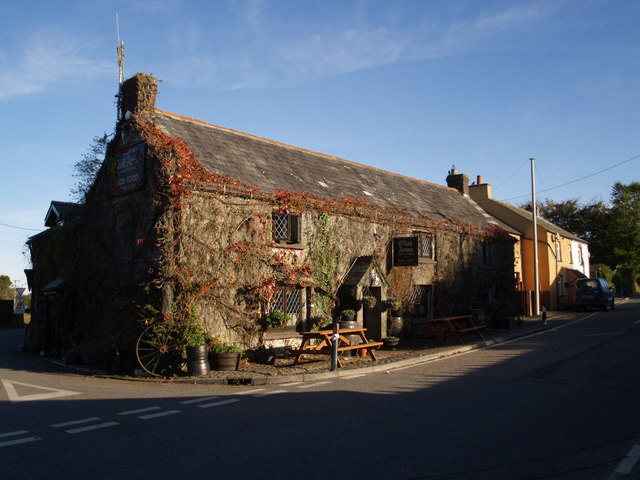
The Eliot Arms, Tregadillett

Tregadillett (Cornish: Tregadyles) is the largest settlement in the civil parish of St Thomas the Apostle Rural and is situated beside the A30 trunk road about 3 miles (5 km) west of Launceston. The village has a primary school, community centre, shared with The Church of Christ the Cornerstone, Tregadillett and a pub, The Eliot Arms; the post office closed down, but now operates from the community centre on Mondays.

== Governance ==
There are two tiers of local government covering St Thomas the Apostle Rural, at parish and unitary authority level: St Thomas the Apostle Rural Parish Council and Cornwall Council. The parish council generally meets at the Tregadillett Community Centre, which forms part of the same building as St Mary's Church at Tregadillett.
