= South Petherwin =

Village in Cornwall, England

Coordinates: 50.612°N 4.390°W

South Petherwin: Cornish: Paderwynn Dheghow
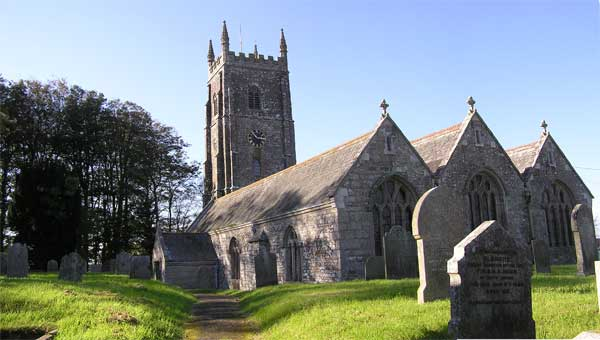
- South Petherwin church

- Location within Cornwall
- Population: 931 (Parish, 2011)
- OS grid reference: SX 310 818
- Civil parish: South Petherwin
- Unitary authority: Cornwall
- Ceremonial county: Cornwall
- Region: South West
- Country: England
- Sovereign state: United Kingdom
- Post town: LAUNCESTON
- Postcode district: PL15
- Dialling code: 01566
- Police: Devon and Cornwall
- Fire: Cornwall
- Ambulance: South Western
- UK Parliament: North Cornwall

South Petherwin (Cornish: Paderwynn Dheghow) is a village and civil parish in east Cornwall, England, United Kingdom. It is in the Registration District of Launceston. The civil parish is bounded to the north by the Launceston parishes of St Thomas and St Mary Magdalene, to the east by Lawhitton and Lezant parishes and to the west by Trewen parish. The population of the parish in the 2001 census was 932. The district falls in the Altarnun electoral ward but the population of the civil parish at the 2011 Census was almost unchanged at 931.

South Petherwin village is situated 3 miles (5 km) south-southwest of the town of Launceston on the road from Launceston to Liskeard. The parish church, dedicated to St Paternus, stands in the village at grid reference SX 309 819. The church's tower has pinnacles and battlements and it houses a ring of five bells.

== History ==
The Saint, Patern (or Padarn, Paternus) has had several candidates, which have become mixed and confused over the ages. It is believed that the actual St. Patern to which the Parishes of North and South Petherwin are dedicated, was actually the father of St. Constantine of Cornwall, a Cornish King who gave up his throne to become a monk. St. Patern and St. Constantine have thus always been linked, with dedications always being near one another (a Celtic practice when saints are related or work together) (St. Constantine Church at Milton Abbot being the case in point for South Petherwin).

With the assumption that Dunheved (now known as Launceston) was the seat of the Celtic Kings of the area and that when Constantine became a monk he gave his territory to the Celtic Church, the Parish, along with North Petherwin and Lawhitton (Landwithan), would have been administered by the Celtic Bishop from St German's Priory.

With the West Saxon invasion, the new King created a new diocese in the South West based at Sherborne in 909 AD. The lands which were controlled by the Celtic Bishop, were conceded to the new Bishop's control, to finance his work in Cornwall. It is with the Saxons that both Petherwins began to dominate the region, with the River Kensey being the natural divide. North Petherwin in the North with the new monastery of St. Stephens (a Saxon abbot being appointed to quell the Celts), and South Petherwin to the south of the Kensey: Dunheved was allowed to decline, as a means to crush the Celtic will. The see of the Diocese moved first to Crediton from Sherborne, then on to Exeter in 1050.

=== Norman period ===
The next radical change came with the Normans who sought to suppress the West Saxon control. First St. Stephen's was reduced as a monastery with the priory being moved across the Kensey to Newport. Then the ruined ancient fort of Dunheved was rebuilt as a Castle and walled town. At that time South Petherwin became the mother Church for Launceston, and it is the Church's importance in providing a valuable source of income to the church as a whole, that accounts for the size of the Church when it was rebuilt in the fifteenth century. Its significance is also shown by the existence of five roads which all lead to the Church. (Three still exist as normal tarmac roads; one is a footpath leading across fields from Tregadillett, with a fifth road from Trecrogo, which is now blocked off.) The estate was much larger than the present Parish and also included Trewen, hence the medieval association between St. Michael's Church, Trewen and St. Paternus's Church, South Petherwin (a link now ended with the consolidation of parochial charges).

The parish is now situated in the Hundred of East and deanery of Trigg Major.

== Churches ==
=== Parish church ===
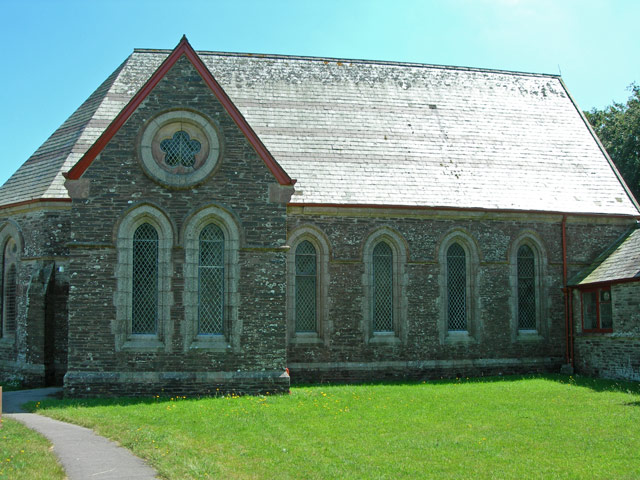
South Petherwin Methodist Church

The church consists of a chancel, nave, north and south aisles, and vestry. The chancel was restored in the 19th century. The arcades each consist of six four-centred arches, supported on monolith granite pillars. There are north and south porches. The tower has three stages, and is buttressed on the square; it is wholly built of local stone apart from the battlements and pinnacles which are of granite. The belfry contains six bells and a clock. There was a holy well in a field at Oldwit Farm, where water was collected and brought to the church each time a baptism took place.

The Priest-in-charge of Lezant, Lewannick, North Hill and Lawhitton is responsible for this parish also; Trewen is the responsibility of the Vicar of Egloskerry.

Ambrose Manaton a local landowner and M.P. died in 1651 and was buried at South Petherwin, where his monument displayed the arms of Manaton and Reskymer, and Manaton and Edgcombe.

=== Nonconformist chapels ===
There was a Methodist and a Baptist chapel in the Churchtown, and a Bible Christian chapel at Trecrogo Lane-end.

== Stanley Simmonds ==
Stanley Simmonds was an English painter and art teacher who retired from teaching in 1983 and he and his wife moved to South Petherwin (near Launceston where his friend Charles Causley lived). There he set up a studio in a former Bible Christian chapel, where he continued to paint until his death in 2006. Retrospective exhibitions of his work were held in Launceston in 2012, organised by the Charles Causley Society, Lewes in 2014 and Egdean, Sussex, in 2015.

== Sources ==
- Artemis Arts (15 June 2016). "Stanley Simmonds ARCA 1917–2006. A Retrospective Exhibition". Artemis Arts.
- Gillbard, John (2013). South Petherwin Parish Past & Present No 1. Redruth: Gillbard Press. ISBN 978-0957609648.
- Moncrieff-Bray Gallery (6 October 2015). "Stanley Simmonds (1917–2006) Paintings from his Cornish Studio". Moncrieff-Bray Gallery.
- stanleysimmonds.com (2013). "Stanley Simmonds. A list of previous exhibitions". stanleysimmonds.com.
- Telegraph Announcements (2006). "Deaths>Simmonds". Telegraph Announcements.
