= Launceston Priory =

Priory in Launceston, Cornwall, England

Coordinates: 50.636425°N 4.355307°W

Launceston Priory was a priory at Newport, Launceston, Cornwall, England, UK.

The priory was founded 1127 by William Warelwast, Bishop of Exeter as a house of Augustinian canons. Its charter replaced an earlier foundation of secular canons at St Stephens, a collegiate church dating back to c. 830. In c. 1155 the priory completed a move from its original site at St. Stephens to Newport in the valley of the River Kensey.

Although the priory was dissolved in 1539, it was one of three earlier Cornish monastic sites (the others being at Bodmin and St Germans) to appear in King Henry VIII's 1540 proposals to establish a new cathedral for Cornwall. None of these proposals succeeded, and the buildings at Launceston were gradually robbed of stone and materials and levelled with extra soil until nothing was visible.

The site was re-discovered in 1886 and 1888 (during the construction of the railway and a gas holder) and excavated by Otho B. Peter, thus allowing the plan to be reconstructed. The plan drawn by Peter reveals the complexity and large scale of the buildings.

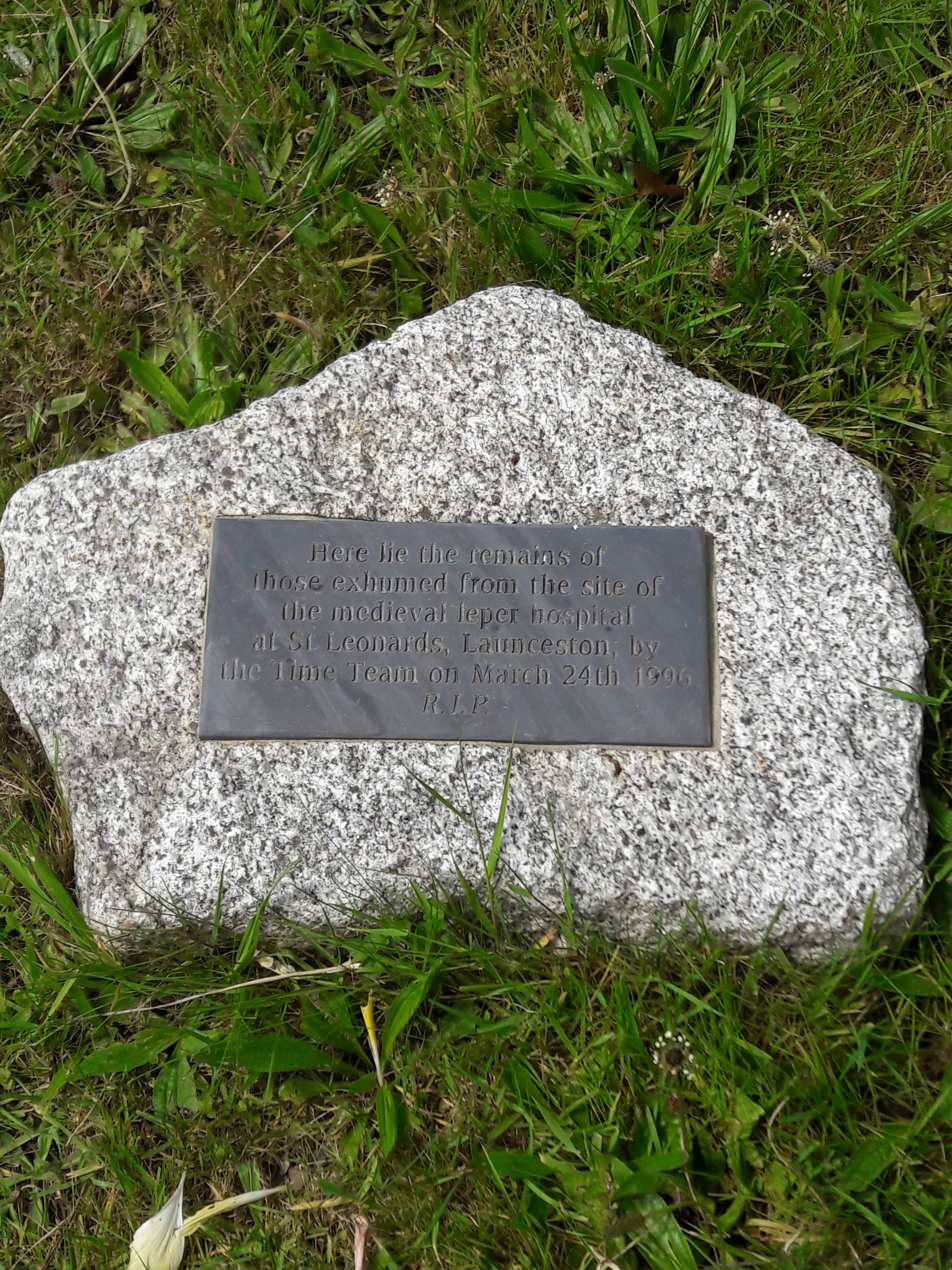
Plaque in St Thomas's churchyard

In the late 20th century the ruins fell into disrepair, but in recent years they have been consolidated, the grounds tidied up, access improved and interpretation boards set up. The Friends of Launceston Priory in partnership with Launceston Town Council now care for the ruins, which are to be found at: 1 Riverside, Newport, Launceston PL15 8DH; to the rear of the (Anglican) church of St Thomas the Apostle.
