= Lawhitton =

Village in Cornwall, England

Coordinates: 50.617°N 4.326°W

Lawhitton: Cornish: Lannwydhan
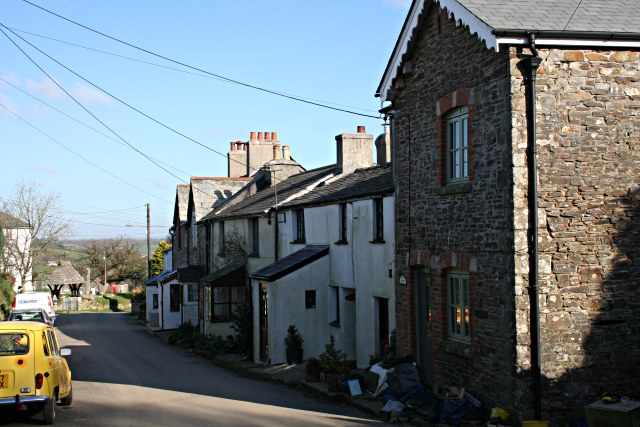
- A terrace of cottages in Lawhitton

- Location within Cornwall
- Population: 301 (Lawhitton Rural parish, 2021)
- OS grid reference: SX355824
- Civil parish: Lawhitton Rural
- Unitary authority: Cornwall
- Ceremonial county: Cornwall
- Region: South West
- Country: England
- Sovereign state: United Kingdom
- Post town: LAUNCESTON
- Postcode district: PL15
- Dialling code: 01566
- Police: Devon and Cornwall
- Fire: Cornwall
- Ambulance: South Western
- UK Parliament: North Cornwall

Lawhitton (Cornish: Lannwydhan) is a village in Cornwall, England, United Kingdom. The village is situated two miles (3 km) south-west of Launceston and half-a-mile west of Cornwall's border with Devon at the River Tamar. The village is the main settlement in the civil parish of Lawhitton Rural, which was created in 1894 from the part of the old parish of Lawhitton that lay outside the borough boundaries of Launceston. The border with Devon forms the parish's eastern boundary; to the north, it is bounded by St Thomas by Launceston parish; to the west by Launceston parish; and to the south by Lezant parish. At the 2021 census the population of the parish was 301.

== History ==
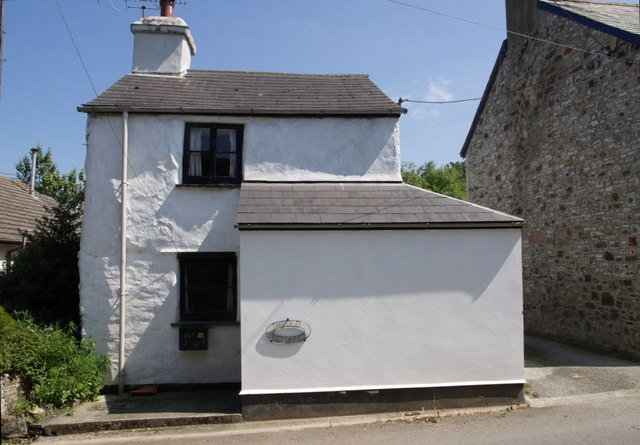
Old Post Office, Lawhitton

At the time of Domesday Book (1086) the manor was held by the bishop and had 11 hides of land and land for 40 ploughs. The lord had land for 2 ploughs with 7 serfs, and 27 villeins and 20 smallholders had land for 29 ploughs. There was 8 acres of meadow, 100 acres of pasture and 10 acres of underwood. The value of the manor was £17 though it had formerly been worth only £8.

Until 1261 the benefice of Lawhitton consisted of a vicarage and a sinecure rectory; they were then combined as a rectory. From then until 1924 there were 60 rectors, of whom probably only 19 were resident. The last of these rectors was Henry Du Boulay who was concurrently Archdeacon of Bodmin from 1892 to 1924 Du Boulay was ordained in 1864 and died in 1925; he was the son of an earlier rector of Lawhitton.

There is a Cornish cross at Treniffle; it was found built into an old barn at Tregada Farm about 1883 and then placed in her garden by Mrs. Morshead.

== Parish church ==
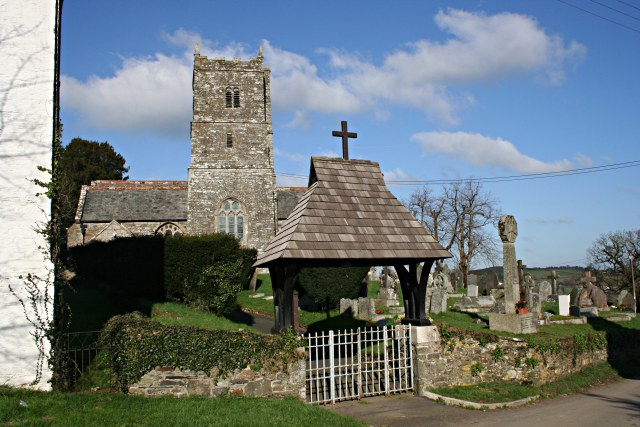
Lawhitton church

The parish church of St Michael is in Lawhitton village at SX 355 825; it is of various periods of English Gothic architecture. The plan is unusual and the tower stands in the position of a south transept. The tower is 13th century in date and there is a north aisle. The font is Norman, of the Altarnun type. Features of interest include the Jacobean pulpit, 1665, and two monuments, to R. Bennet (d. 1683) and in Coade stone to Richard Bennet-Coffin (d. 1796).

=== Bennett-Coffin family ===
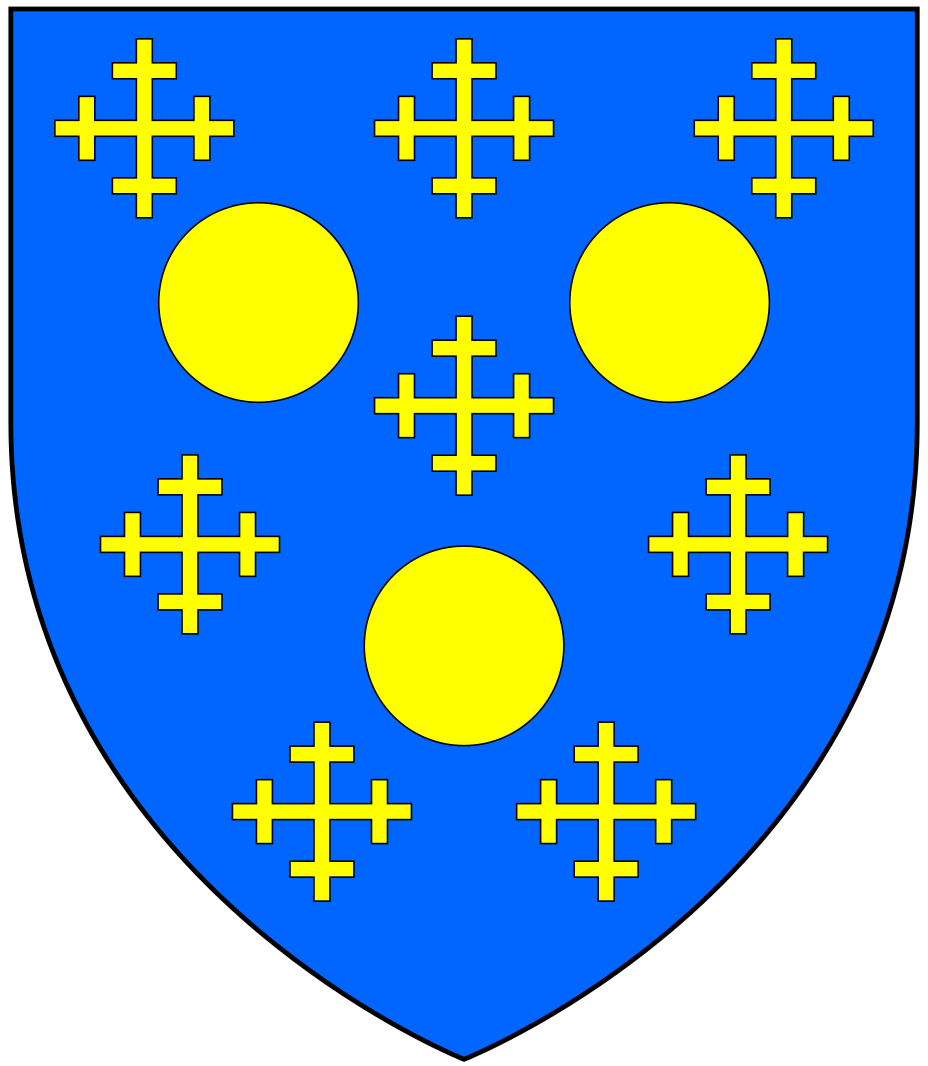
Arms of Coffin: Azure, three bezants between eight crosses crosslet or. Often shown with varying number of crosses, in which case: Azure semé of crosses crosslet or, three bezants

Richard Bennet (d.1619), a Councillor at Law, built Hexworthy House as his seat within the parish. The Bennet family originated in Sussex and settled at Hexworthy during the reign of Queen Elizabeth I (1558–1603). His son was Col. Robert Bennet (1605–1683) of Hexworthy, a Member of Parliament during the Civil War and a noted commander of the Parliamentarian forces. His descendant Richard Bennett-Coffin (d.1796) was the second son of Edward Bennett of Lawhitton by his wife Honor Coffin (born 1682), 11th daughter of Richard Coffin (1623–1700) of Portledge in the parish of Alwington in North Devon, lord of the manor of Alwington and Sheriff of Devon in 1683. Richard Bennett-Coffin (1715-1796) became heir to the Coffin estates following the death of his childless uncle Richard Coffin (1684–1766). The Coffin family had been established at Alwington since the reign of King Henry II (1154–1189), and remained there in unbroken male succession until 1766. Richard Bennett adopted the name and arms of Coffin in 1767 by Act of Parliament, but died without progeny at Esher in Surrey and was buried at Lawhitton where survives his monument. However, the inscription on this is misleading in its ending: 'Dying without Issue In him ended the Lineal Descent of the Families of BENNETT and COFFIN'. Richard had an elder brother, William Bennett (1712-1788), who had many descendents (see his memorial stone in St Stephen by Saltash church, Saltash, Cornwall).

Richard's heir was Rev. John Pine-Coffin (1735–1824), eldest surviving grandson of Dorothy Coffin (1651–1690), eldest daughter of Richard Coffin (1623–1700), who in 1672 married Edward Pyne (1648–1675) of East Down. Her descendants remained seated at East Down manor house until 1866, the Pyne family having occupied it since the 13th century. The last in the Pine-Coffin family to occupy Portledge manor house was Richard Geoffrey Pine-Coffin (1908–1974).

== Governance ==
There are two tiers of local government covering Lawhitton, at parish and unitary authority level: Lawhitton Parish Council and Cornwall Council. The parish council meets at the Village Hall.

=== Administrative history ===
Lawhitton was an ancient parish. A relatively small area at the north-western tip of the parish fell within the borough boundaries of Launceston. The Local Government Act 1894 directed that parishes could no longer straddle borough boundaries, and so the old parish of Lawhitton was split into two civil parishes: "Lawhitton Urban" covering the part inside the borough of Launceston and "Lawhitton Rural" covering the part outside the borough. Lawhitton village fell within the Lawhitton Rural parish. At the 1891 census (the last before the abolition of the parish), Lawhitton had a population of 361. Lawhitton Urban parish was abolished in 1922, when all the urban parishes within the borough of Launceston were united into a single parish.

Lawhitton Rural remains the official name of the civil parish, but its parish council simply calls itself "Lawhitton Parish Council". The ecclesiastical parish is simply called "Lawhitton".

== Notable resident ==
James Ruse 1759–1837 from the area was aboard the first fleet of convicts into Sydney cove in 1788. He went on to become a celebrated farming pioneer.
