= River Kensey =

River in east Cornwall, England

Coordinates: 50°38′25″N 4°19′53″W

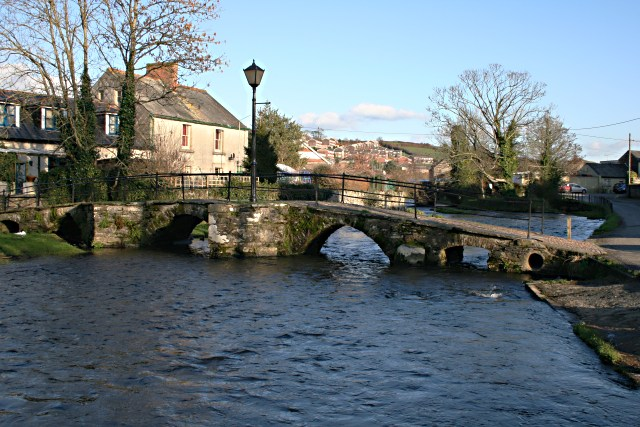
Prior's Bridge and the River Kensey

The River Kensey is a river in east Cornwall, England, UK which is a tributary of the River Tamar.

The river rises at Kensey in the parish of Treneglos and flows generally east to the south of Tresmeer and Egloskerry and then divides the town of Launceston from its suburb Newport before flowing into the Tamar about a mile east of Launceston. Newport was the site of Launceston Priory, hence the name of the bridge.
