= Trewen =

Hamlet in Cornwall, England

Coordinates: 50.625°N 4.472°W

Trewen: Cornish: Trewenn
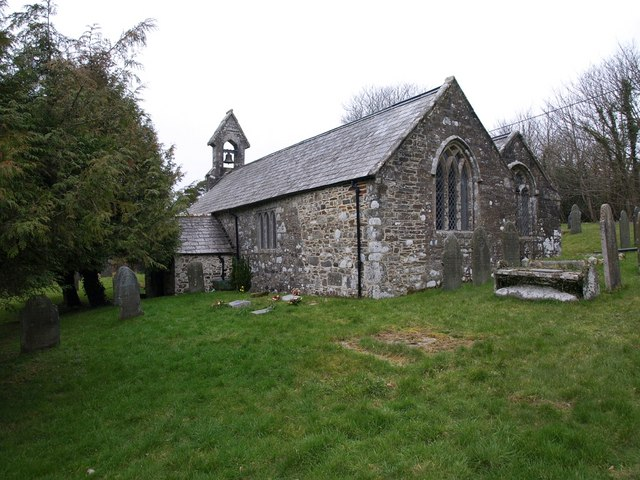
- Trewen Church

- Location within Cornwall
- Population: 142 (Civil Parish, 2011)
- OS grid reference: SX252836
- Civil parish: Trewen
- Unitary authority: Cornwall
- Ceremonial county: Cornwall
- Region: South West
- Country: England
- Sovereign state: United Kingdom
- Post town: LAUNCESTON
- Postcode district: PL15
- Dialling code: 01566
- Police: Devon and Cornwall
- Fire: Cornwall
- Ambulance: South Western
- UK Parliament: North Cornwall

Trewen (Cornish: Trewenn) is a hamlet and a civil parish in east Cornwall, England, United Kingdom. The parish is just east of Bodmin Moor in the River Inny valley and lies in the Registration District of Launceston.

Trewen parish is bounded to the north by Egloskerry parish, to the east by St Thomas-by-Launceston, to the south by South Petherwin and to the west by Altarnun and Laneast parishes. The population of Trewen parish in the 2001 census was 134. This had increased to 142 at the 2011 census. The population of Trewen was 193 in 1801, 221 in 1841, 99 in 1921 (it declined at every census between 1851 and 1921), 80 in 1961 and 141 in 2011 (it increased at every census between 1971 and 2011).

The hamlet of Trewen is situated 5 miles (8 km) west of Launceston. The parish church of St Michael is in the village at OS Grid Ref SX251835. The little church has a bellcote rather than a tower. "The church is an ancient granite building in the Early Perpendicular style, which was restored in 1863/1864; it comprises a chancel, nave, and north aisle". The font is Norman, square and plain. The only other hamlet in the parish of Trewen is Piper's Pool which straddles the A395 road.
