= Lezant =

Village and civil parish in Cornwall, England

Coordinates: 50.588°N 4.348°W

Lezant: Cornish: Lannsant
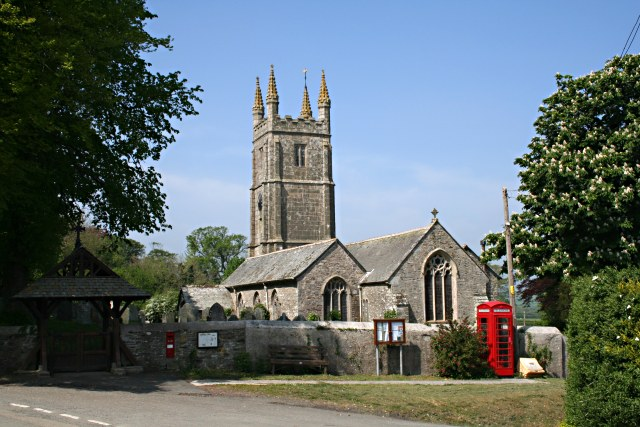
- Lezant Church

- Location within Cornwall
- Population: 756 (United Kingdom Census 2011 including Carthamartha)
- OS grid reference: SX339791
- Civil parish: Lezant
- Unitary authority: Cornwall
- Ceremonial county: Cornwall
- Region: South West
- Country: England
- Sovereign state: United Kingdom
- Post town: LAUNCESTON
- Postcode district: PL15
- Dialling code: 01579
- Police: Devon and Cornwall
- Fire: Cornwall
- Ambulance: South Western
- UK Parliament: North Cornwall

Lezant (Cornish: Lannsant) is a civil parish and village in east Cornwall, England, United Kingdom. Lezant village is about five miles (8 kilometres) south of Launceston. The population of the parish in the 2001 census was 751, increasing slightly to 765 in the 2011 census.

== Geography ==
The parish of Lezant is in the Launceston registration district. The county border with Devon forms the parish's eastern boundary. It is bounded on the north by South Petherwin and Lawhitton.

=== Greystone Quarry and Bridge ===
A historically important road crossing of the River Tamar is 2 miles (3.2 km) from the village at Greystone Bridge; the arched stone bridge was built in 1439. Greystone Bridge is the site of a large aggregate quarry operated by Bardon Aggregates. The quarry walls are designated as the Greystone Quarry SSSI (Site of Special Scientific Interest), for its geological characteristics.

== Notable people ==
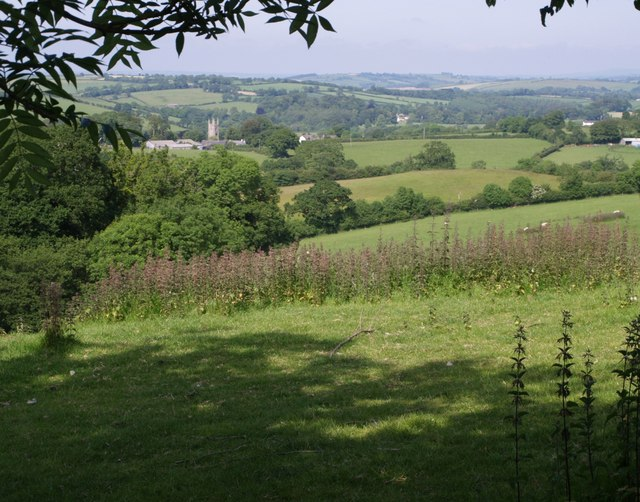
View towards Lezant

- Peter of Cornwall, a medieval scholar and prior of Holy Trinity, Aldgate, was born near Launceston, Cornwall, the son of Jordan of Trecarrel (died c. 1180).
- Matthew Sutcliffe, Dean of Exeter for over 40 years from 1588 was also Rector of Lezant from 1594.
- John Woolton (1535?-1594) was Bishop of Exeter, and from 1584 held the rectory of Lezant in plurality.
