= Launceston, Cornwall =

Town in Cornwall, England

Coordinates: 50.637°N 4.360°W

Launceston: Cornish: Lannstevan
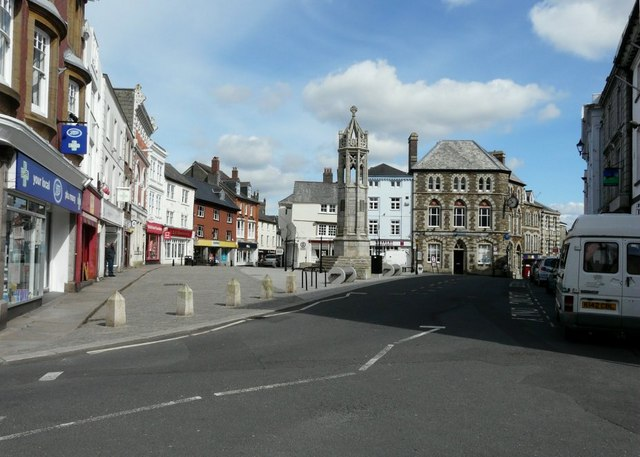
- Town Square

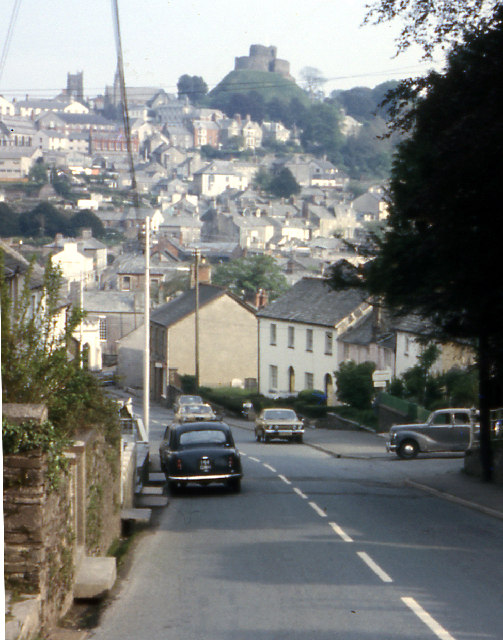
- Town centre in 1973 from Saint Stephen's Hill showing the prominent Launceston Castle

- Location within Cornwall
- Population: 10,247 (Parish, 2021); 8,425 (Built up area, 2021)
- Motto: Royale et Loyale
- OS grid reference: SX335845
- Civil parish: Launceston
- Unitary authority: Cornwall
- Ceremonial county: Cornwall
- Region: South West
- Country: England
- Sovereign state: United Kingdom
- Post town: LAUNCESTON
- Postcode district: PL15
- Dialling code: 01566
- Police: Devon and Cornwall
- Fire: Cornwall
- Ambulance: South Western
- UK Parliament: North Cornwall

Launceston (/ˈlɑːnstən, ˈlɔːn-/ LAHN-stən, LAWN-, locally /ˈlænsən, ˈlɑːn-/ LA(H)N-sən; rarely spelt Lanson as a local abbreviation; Cornish: Lannstevan [lanːˈstɛvan]) is a town and civil parish in Cornwall, England, United Kingdom. It is 1 mile (1.6 km) west of the River Tamar, which forms almost the entire border between Cornwall and Devon. The landscape of the town is generally steep, rising from the River Kensey, a tributary of the Tamar, up to the hill on which Launceston Castle stands.

The castle was built by Robert, Count of Mortain, (half-brother of William the Conqueror) c. 1070 to control the surrounding area. Launceston was the caput of the feudal barony of Launceston and of the Earldom of Cornwall until replaced by Lostwithiel in the 13th century. Launceston was later the county town of Cornwall until 1838 when Bodmin replaced it. Launceston's motto "Royale et Loyale" (English translation: Royal and Loyal) is a reference to its adherence to the Cavalier cause during the English Civil War of the 1640s.

The town is known as one of the gateways to Cornwall, being near where the A30 road enters the county. The road historically went through the centre of the town, but now bypasses it to the south. Launceston Steam Railway, a narrow-gauge heritage railway, runs during the summer months. At the 2021 census the population of the civil parish was 10,247 and the population of the built up area as defined by the Office for National Statistics was 8,425.

== History ==
The Cornish name of "Launceston", Lannstevan, means the "church enclosure of St Stephen", and includes the Common Brittonic placename element lan- (church enclosure / estate). It is derived from the former monastery at St Stephen's, at the northern end of the modern town. The castle was built about 0.75 miles (1.2 km) south-east of St Stephen's. The Saxon name Dunheved, likely meaning "hill summit", was historically used for castle and the town which grew up around it in the West Saxon period. Both names came to be used for the town, with Launceston gradually becoming the dominant name, although the legal name of the borough which covered the town remained "Dunheved, otherwise Launceston" until 1974.

The earliest known Cornish mint was at Launceston, which operated on a minimal scale at the time of Æthelred the Unready before Cornwall received full diocesan jurisdiction in 994. Only one specimen is known to exist. In the reign of William the Conqueror, the mint was moved to Dunheved and remained in existence until the reign of Henry II, 1160. During the reign of Henry III of England, another mint was established in Launceston.

Launceston Castle, in good repair, is a Norman motte-and-bailey castle, and was built by Robert, Count of Mortain (half-brother of William the Conqueror) c. 1070 to dominate the surrounding area. Launceston was the caput of the feudal barony of Launceston and of the Earldom of Cornwall until replaced by Lostwithiel in the 13th century. Launceston was later the county town of Cornwall until 1838 when Bodmin replaced it. The lands of Robert, Count of Mortain, became the core holdings of the feudal barony of Launceston, and the Fleming family continued to hold most of their manors from that barony, as can be seen from entries in the Book of Fees.

In the Domesday Book (1086) it is recorded that Launceston was held by the Count of Mortain, and that he had his castle there. There was land for 10 ploughs, 1 villein and 13 smallholders with 4 ploughs, 2 mills which paid 40 shillings (£2 sterling) and 40 acres of pasture. The value of the manor was only £4 though it had formerly been worth £20. The earlier settlement of Launceston around St Stephen's was gradually eclipsed in importance by the settlement initially known as Dunheved around the castle to the south-east. The main market for the area had been at St Stephen's, but it was transferred in 1086 to Dunheved.

The Roman Catholic saint and martyr Cuthbert Mayne was executed at Launceston in 1577; a legacy of memorials and a church exists.

=== Civil War ===
During the English Civil War Launceston was known to be Royale et Loyale to Charles I of England, hence its coat of arms. His son, who was later crowned Charles II of England, stayed in the town for a couple of days en route to the Cavalier army based further west.

In 1643, the Parliamentarian forces under the command of Major General James Chudleigh advanced in an attempt to capture Launceston from the Royalists. The Royalist commander, Ralph Hopton, 1st Baron Hopton, stationed his forces on the summit of Beacon Hill, a steep hill which overlooks the town. The Parliamentarians captured the foot of the hill, but were unable to dislodge the Royalist forces from the top. Hopton led a counterattack down the hill and, despite fierce fighting and the arrival of Parliamentary reinforcements, forced Chudleigh's troops to retreat.

Sir Richard Grenville, 1st Baronet was committed by Prince Charles to Launceston Prison for refusing to obey Lord Hopton; Grenville had already quarrelled with General George Goring, Lord Goring.

=== Later history ===
Launceston has the only document in the UK signed by Mary II of England and her husband, William III of England. The very poor means of transport within Cornwall, which did not begin to be improved until the late 18th century, meant that assizes were held in Launceston. When the situation had been improved Bodmin became the county town where the assizes were held (at the Shire Hall there in 1838).

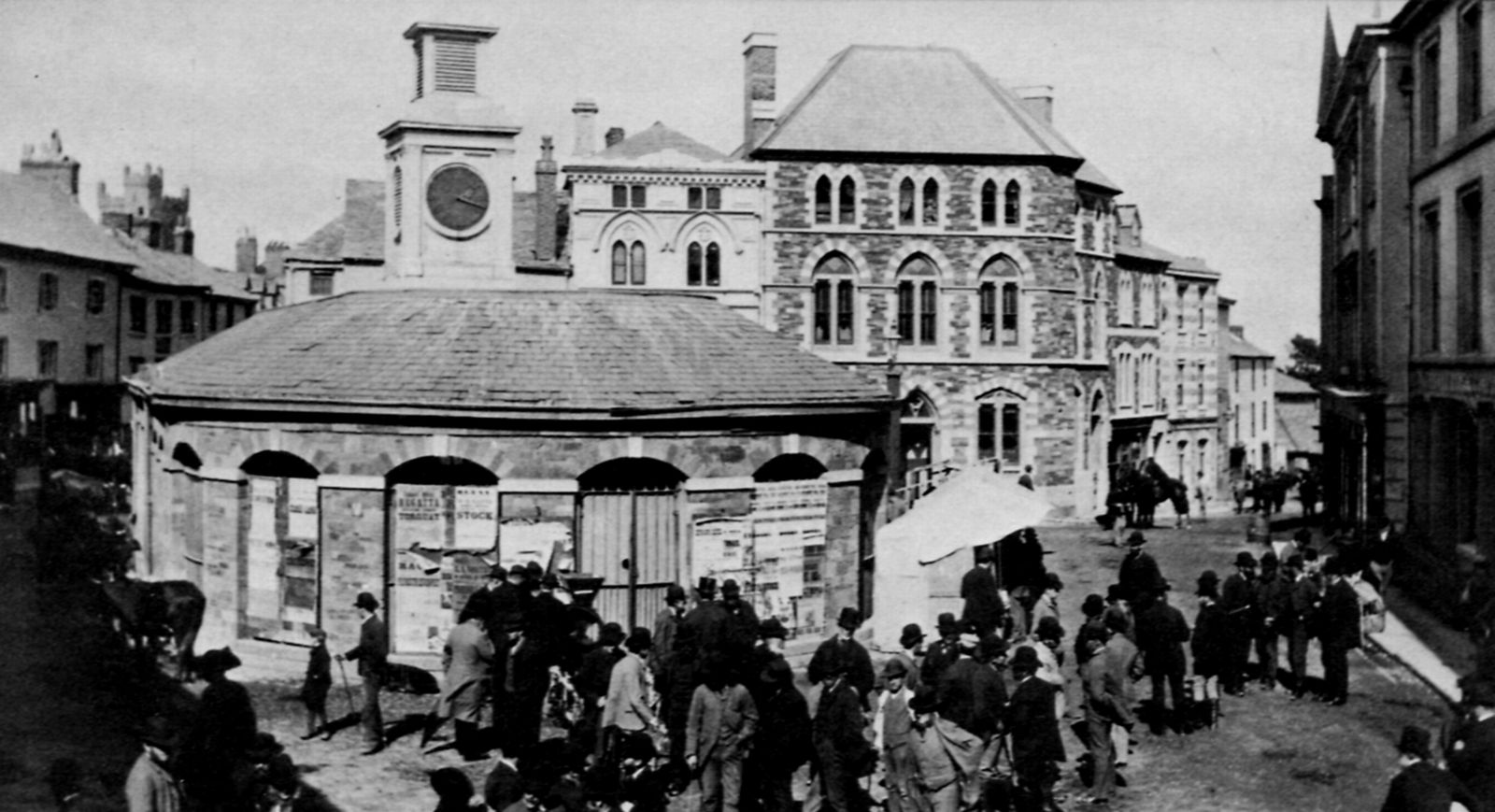
The market at Launceston (period 1850–98) by Francis Frith

Viscount Launceston was a title of nobility created in 1726 (as Viscount of Launceston) but is now extinct. In the early 19th century, Launceston gave its name to the settlement, Launceston, Tasmania, which is now the second largest city in Tasmania.

During World War Two, racial tensions in the ranks of American soldiers sparked a shootout in the town square. Fourteen African American soldiers of the 581st Ordnance Ammunition Company were charged with mutiny.

In 1973, Prince Charles visited to receive his feudal dues from the Duchy of Cornwall.

== Geography ==
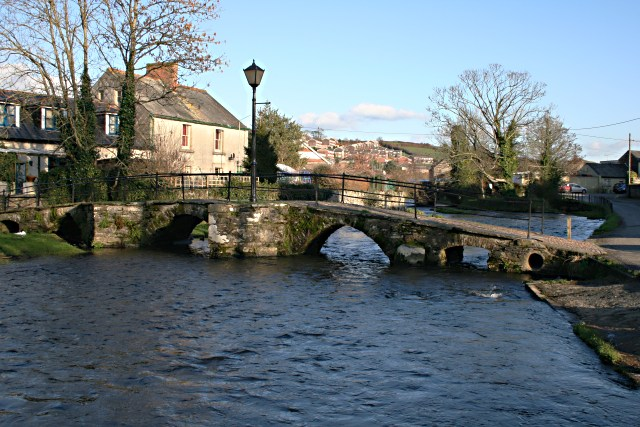
Prior's Bridge over the River Kensey

Launceston is a market town, castle, recreational and heritage railway visitor town and the main shopping centre for the adjoining rural areas of west Devon and east Cornwall. The town is mainly built on the south side of a large hill almost immune to flooding, unlike its northern neighbourhood, Newport in part on a slightly wider plain at the bottom of the hill, which is susceptible to flooding by the River Kensey.

The suburb of Newport is recorded for the first time during the 13th century. The natural advantages of the Launceston district had been recognised by the Anglo-Saxon monks of St Stephen and by the Norman lord of Cornwall in the reign of King William I. At this point in the course of the River Tamar it is joined by four tributaries within a short distance and its floodplain is relatively large, while further south the Tamar valley is narrow and meandering.

Launceston is connected to the A30 trunk route, a dual carriageway bypass carrying its road traffic south of the town. The bypass crosses the River Tamar on the Dunheved Bridge built in 1975–1976 and substantially rebuilt 2006–2007. Through this the town is approximately 42 miles (68 km) west of Exeter, 27 miles (43 km) north-west of Plymouth and 21 miles (34 km) east of the smaller regional centre of Bodmin. It is roughly midway between the north coast of Cornwall (at Bude) and the south coast (at Saltash).

Stourscombe SSSI, a geological Site of Special Scientific Interest, one mile (1.6 km) to the east of Launceston, is designated ″... for the best inland exposure of the Upper Devonian in South West England and the type locality of the Stourscombe Beds (Upper Famennian).″

== Notable buildings ==
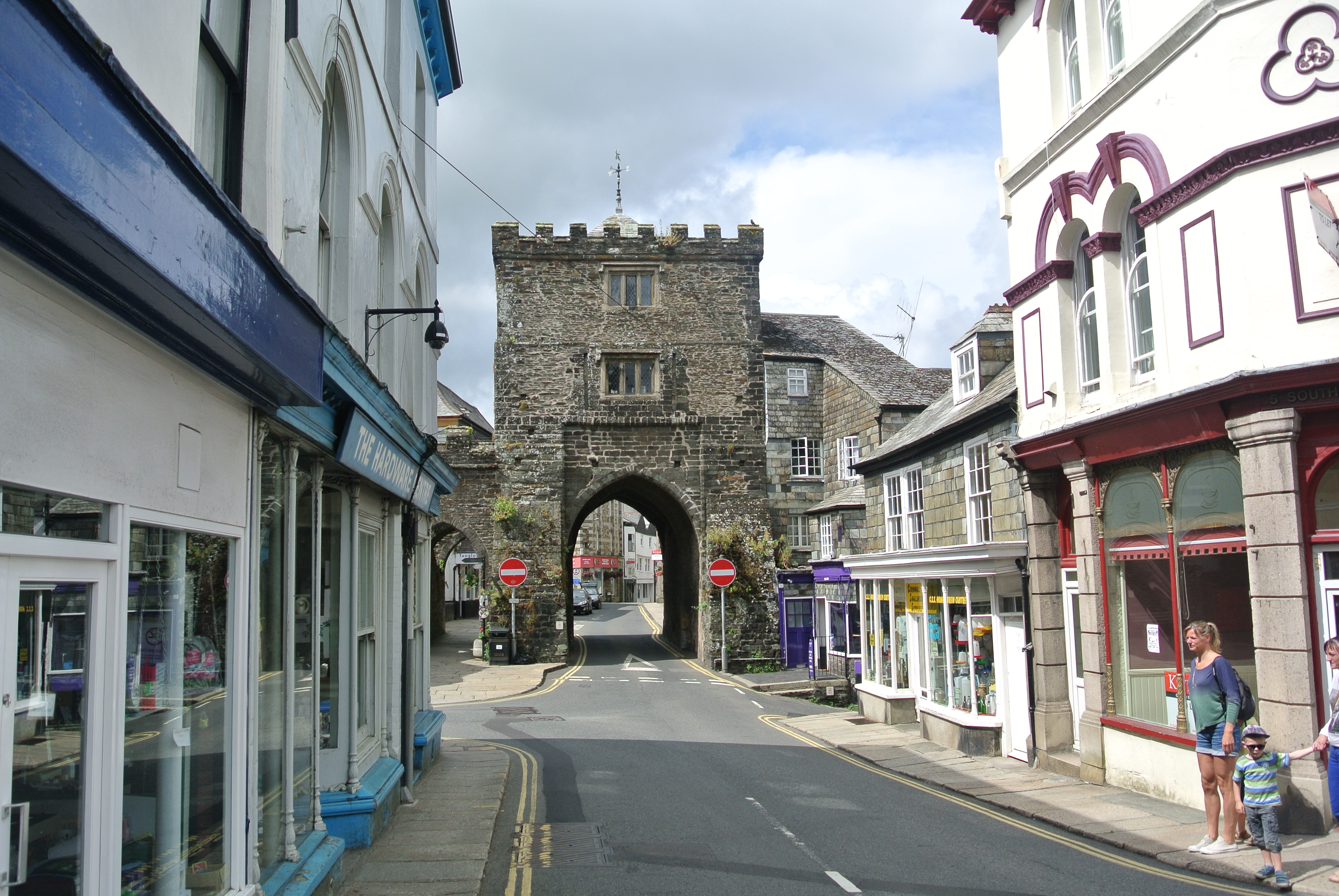
South Gate

Part of the town wall is still in existence including the South Gate of two arches. The White Hart Hotel incorporates a Norman doorway possibly removed from the Friary at St Thomas'. New Bridge (early 16th century) crosses the River Tamar: it is of granite. Two old bridges cross the River Kensey: one mediaeval and one built in 1580. The Baptist chapel is late 18th century and a number of Georgian houses may also be seen.

Three nonconformist churches/chapels served the 19th-century town: Wesleyan Methodist, Bible Christian, and Calvinist. North Cornwall and West Devon's Elim Pentecostal Church is in the town.

Lawrence House, a Grade II* listed building on Castle St, houses the town museum.

Madford is a house built in the second half of the 17th century by Sir Hugh Piper. By 1777 it came into the possession of Richard Vyvyan of Trelowarren through his marriage to Philippa Piper. Philip Vyvyan, son of Richard, conveyed it to the Rev. John Lethbridge whose successors were attorneys and also town clerks and deputy recorders of Launceston. The legal firm of Lethbridge was joined in 1828 by Charles Gurney who in 1833 became town clerk, an office he held until 1867. The next town clerk was John Lethbridge Cowlard who bought Madford from his uncle in 1841 (he was also borough treasurer for over 50 years).

== Governance ==
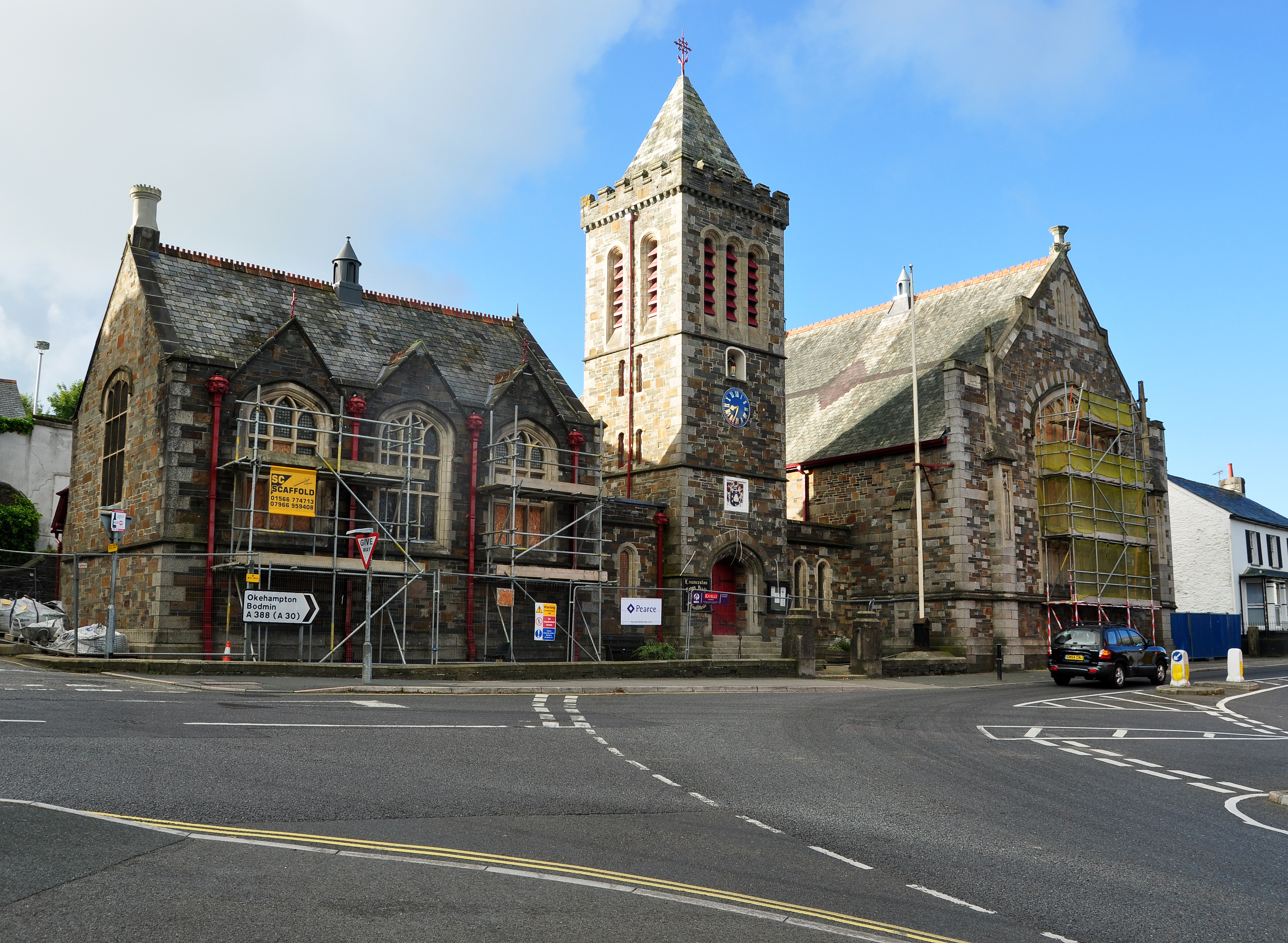
Launceston Guildhall and Town Hall

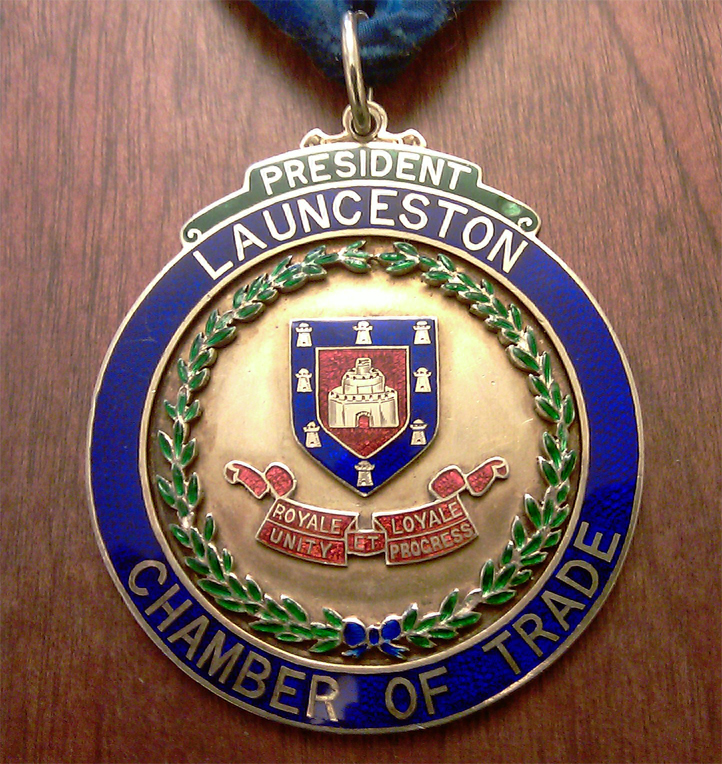
Launceston Chamber of Trade President's Chain showing the coat of arms and motto

There are two tiers of local government covering Launceston, at parish (town) and unitary authority level: Launceston Town Council and Cornwall Council. The town council is based at Launceston Town Hall on Western Road.

For parliamentary elections, the town has been part of the North Cornwall constituency since 1918. Since the 2024 general election the MP has been Ben Maguire, a Liberal Democrat.

=== Administrative history ===
Launceston was anciently part of the parish of St Stephen, which covered Launceston and surrounding rural areas, including parts of Devon. The parish was gradually subdivided. In the outlying rural areas, Laneast, Werrington, and St Giles on the Heath became separate parishes. With the parish church at St Stephen's being some distance from the main part of the town around the castle, several chapels of ease were built in the town.

St Mary Magdalene's Church was largely rebuilt between 1511 and 1524 and was subsequently raised from being a chapel of ease to being a parish church, being assigned a parish covering the southern parts of the town and rural areas to the south. The church from Launceston Priory, dedicated to St Thomas the Apostle, was retained for use as a chapel of ease after the priory was dissolved in 1539. It was subsequently made a parish church in 1726 and given a parish covering an area south of the River Kensey and north of the castle and town centre (which area was known as the hamlet of St Thomas Street), and also extending into rural areas to the west of the town. The reduced parish of St Stephen north of the Kensey subsequently came to be known as St Stephens by Launceston, to distinguish it from other parishes of the same name, such as St Stephens by Saltash.

Dunheved was an ancient borough. Its earliest known charter was granted by Richard, Earl of Cornwall; the document is not dated but it is believed to have been issued sometime between 1231 and 1272. The borough was originally defined to cover a relatively small area around the castle and town centre. This borough served as a constituency for parliamentary elections from 1295 as the Launceston parliamentary borough, returning two members of parliament.

Immediately north of the borough of Dunheved was an area on the banks of the Kensey known as the borough of Newport. This area was controlled by Launceston Priory as its manorial owner until the priory's dissolution, after which it passed to the Duchy of Cornwall. It was never incorporated as a borough for municipal purposes, but it became a constituency in the early 16th century, shortly before the priory's dissolution, returning two members of parliament as the Newport parliamentary borough.

The Reform Act 1832, which sought to eliminate rotten boroughs, abolished the Newport constituency and reduced the Launceston constituency to having just one member of parliament. At the same time, the Launceston constituency was enlarged to take in the parish of St Stephen and the parts of the parishes of Lawhitton, St Thomas the Apostle, and South Petherwin that lay outside the borough of Dunheved, otherwise Launceston. The enlarged constituency therefore took in the whole area of the pre-1832 Newport constituency, as well as surrounding rural areas.

Dunheved, otherwise Launceston, was reformed to become a municipal borough in 1836 under the Municipal Corporations Act 1835, which standardised how most boroughs operated. Although the constituency had been enlarged in 1832, the municipal borough kept the same boundaries as the ancient borough, and therefore excluded parts of the urban area, notably Newport. In order to provide more modern local government functions, including water supply and sewers, a Launceston local board district was established in 1850, covering the municipal borough plus parts of the parishes of St Thomas and St Stephen, including Newport and the main settlement at St Stephen's. The borough of Dunheved, otherwise Launceston, and the local board district of Launceston then existed alongside each other with their separate functions and overlapping but different boundaries, until 1889 when the borough was enlarged to match the local board district. The local board was then dissolved and its functions taken on by the borough council.

The borough council built Launceston Town Hall in phases between 1881 and 1887 to serve as its headquarters. The Guildhall wing was built first, followed by the Town Hall wing.

The Local Government Act 1894 directed that civil parishes were no longer allowed to straddle borough boundaries, and so the three parishes of St Thomas the Apostle, St Stephen, and Lawhitton were each split into an urban parish covering the part inside the borough and a rural parish for the part outside the borough. The urban parishes within the borough were subsequently united into a single parish of Dunheved, otherwise Launceston, in 1922.

The borough of Dunheved, otherwise Launceston, was abolished in 1974 under the Local Government Act 1972. The area became part of the new district of North Cornwall. A successor parish was created covering the area of the pre-1974 borough. Whereas the borough retained the name "Dunheved, otherwise Launceston" right up to its abolition in 1974, despite the name Dunheved having long fallen out of general usage, the successor parish was just called Launceston. Its parish council took the name Launceston Town Council. North Cornwall was in turn abolished in 2009. Cornwall County Council then took on district-level functions, making it a unitary authority, and was renamed Cornwall Council.

The blazon of the town's coat of arms is "Gules a triple circular tower in a pyramidal form Or the first battlements mounted with cannon of the last, all within a bordure Azure charged with eight towers domed on the second." A badge was granted on 26 Mar 1906, being the first ever granted to a civic body: A keep or castle Gold.

=== County town ===
The primary function of counties until the 19th century was the administration of justice. Cornwall's senior courts, the assizes, were generally held at Launceston until 1838. Visiting judges toured each county of England to hear cases at the assizes. Launceston's position at the eastern end of Cornwall minimised how much travelling the judges had to do within Cornwall, and in particular avoided the need for them to cross Bodmin Moor. As roads improved, it was decided that a more central location for Cornwall's assizes would be appropriate. Shire Hall was therefore built at Bodmin, which opened in 1838 for hosting the assizes and other courts. Bodmin was thereafter described as the county town rather than Launceston. When elected county councils were established in 1889, Cornwall County Council chose to base itself in Truro rather than Bodmin.

== Economy ==
The outskirts of Launceston host some large retail businesses with convenience, niche and fine weather tourist-catering commerce in the town centre. The three main industrial estates are Pennygillam, Scarne and Newport.

Launceston is located on the A30 trunk road into Cornwall and has a number of transport based business mainly located in Pennygillam Industrial estate. A major local business is the DS Smith packaging products manufacturing plant. Launceston is located in predominately rural area and has a number of business dedicated to supporting the surrounding rural economy.

The town has several restaurants, cafés, takeaways and a number of pubs. There are fewer pubs than in the Victorian era, a national trend with the larger ones tending to survive which specialise in their food, others of which provide live music events on a weekly basis.

A tucking mill was established in the 15th century by the Flemings in the north of the town (Newport), water-powered, continuing in use for corn until 1968. A manuscript left by Richard Robbins (died 1910) records eight tanneries in the town in the 19th century. A mechanics' institute was founded in 1847 at the Central Subscription Room. The gasworks was established as early as 1834 by Waygood & Porter of Beaminster.

The Duchy Originals company first manufactured its products in 2006 by opening a factory in Launceston making sweet and savoury pastry products but made a loss of £447,158 in the financial year 2006/07. During 2009 the bakery in Launceston was sold at a loss, contributing to the Duchy Originals company making a loss for 2009 – 10.

The Natural Fibre Company (TNFC) is a British wool mill based in Launceston and is the only small-scale full range textile mill in the UK. The main focus of the business is to add value to naturally coloured raw fleece which is bought from farmers, smallholders and rare sheep breeders.

== Culture ==
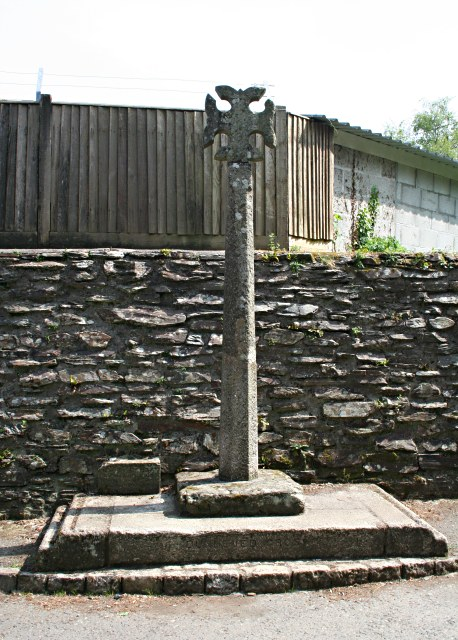
Dunheved Cross

The poet Charles Causley was a native and long-standing resident of the town where he was both born and died. He was at one time contender for Poet Laureate and died in 2003, aged 86. His grave is in the St Thomas Churchyard near the house he lived in, which carries a blue plaque. He contributed the account of Launceston to a feature in the Sunday Times magazine called "Village England". He describes it as belonging to England rather than to Cornwall " Launceston is one of the most important towns in Daphne du Maurier's novel Jamaica Inn.

Launceston annually hosted the "Castle Rock" music festival in July and August, which took place on the lower grounds of the castle which overlooks the town (within the outer walls). As well as a vibrant mix of local bands, the 2006 festival was headlined by Capdown which massively improved the event's profile. The first concert was performed in 1994 and the 2000 edition featured a young artist who was unknown at the time, Jamie Cullum.

The Cornish & Devon Post is one of the newspapers for the district and its office is in the town. Local-specific editions of the paper and other publications are produced. It was founded in 1856 and incorporates the Launceston Weekly News. The Cornish Guardian North Cornwall edition covers Launceston. Four FM radio stations can be received: BBC Radio Cornwall, Pirate FM, Heart West, and Radyo an Gernewegva (online or via large aerials). In December 2013 a periodic community audio magazine was incepted The Launceston Podcast with catch-up services online. Local TV coverage is provided by BBC South West and ITV West Country. Television signals are received from the Caradon Hill TV transmitter.

Sporting clubs include amateur football club Launceston F.C. who play at Pennygillam, rugby union side Launceston Rugby Club who play at Polson Bridge, Launceston Cricket Club, Launceston Golf Club and Dunheved Bowling Club.

There are three community-based drama groups within Launceston itself.

Launceston is twinned with Plestin-les-Grèves in Brittany, France.

=== Places of worship ===
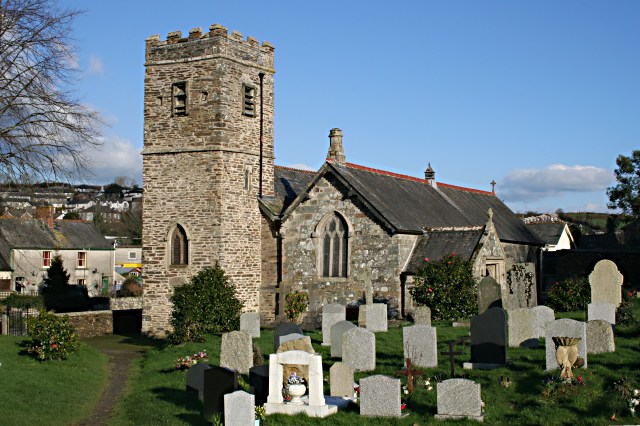
St Thomas's Church, St Thomas by Launceston

Three Anglican churches are in the town which has a united benefice and ecclesiastical parish covering Tregadillett three miles (5 km) west, the same clergy alternating services to provide for a large attendance and operating a combined website.

The Grade I listed church of St Mary Magdalene was built in 1511–1524 by Sir Henry Trecarrel of Trecarrel near the town as a memorial to his infant son who died whilst being bathed. The ornate carvings in granite originally carved for the mansion he began to build at Trecarrel, Lezant have withstood the test of time. The tower dates from the 14th century, an earlier church and graveyard having occupied the site. Its grand organ was presented by a member of the Morice family of Werrington Park. The donor was either Sir William Morice (1707–1750) or his successor, Humphry Morice MP (1723–1785). The casework is elaborate and has been described as "a superb example of 18th century woodwork; the 18th century pipework is also of very high quality".

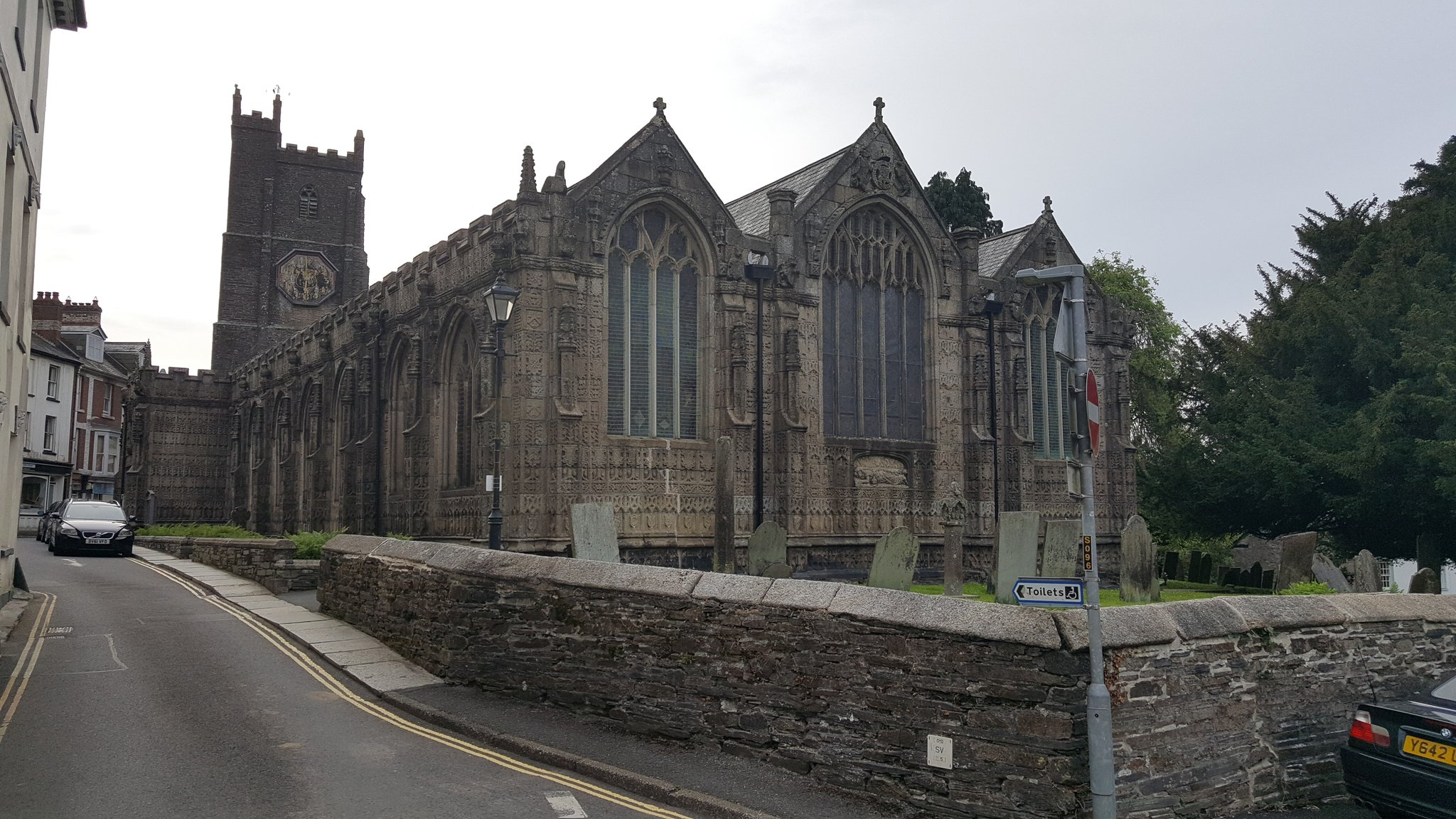
St Mary Magdalene's Church, Launceston, Cornwall

On St Stephen's Hill the main road through the north of the town is the Roman Catholic church consecrated to Cuthbert Mayne (see #History) designed by Arthur Langdon in a blend of Byzantine and Romanesque. It was built in 1911 by local mason F. H. Nicholls of Lewannick, with carpentry by J. H. Harry, the oak doors by a Mr Clifton of Ashwater, and the copper dome by T. Chapman (junior) of Launceston. The lady chapel was added in 1933.

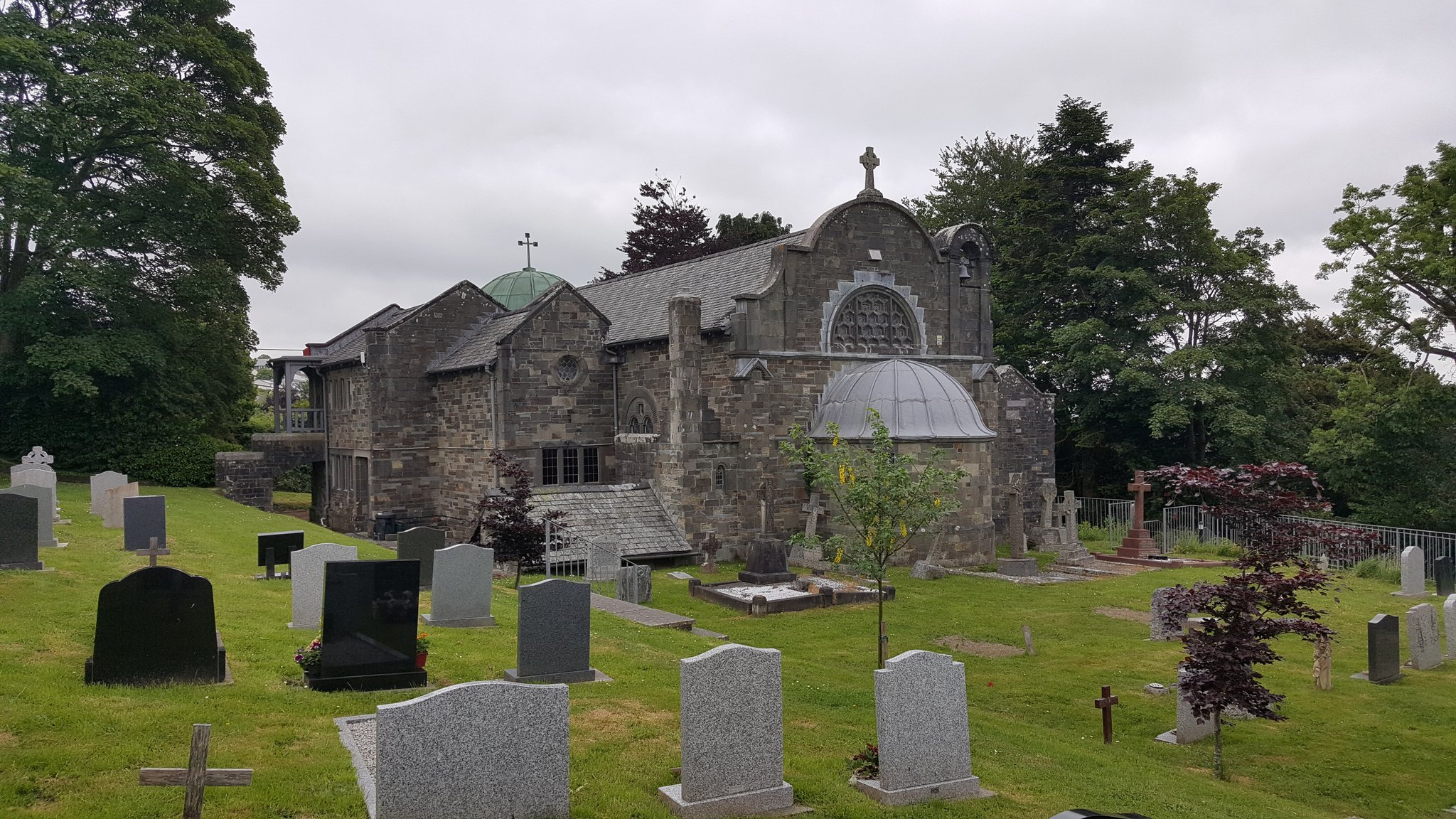
St Cuthbert Mayne, Roman Catholic Church, Launceston, Cornwall.

=== Cornish wrestling ===
Launceston has been a centre for Cornish wrestling for centuries. Places where tournaments were held include: Castle Green, St Stephens, Chapman's Well and Bowling green at Werrington Park.

== Education ==
Five schools are in the town:

- Four primary schools – St Catherine's Church of England Primary, St Stephen's Community Primary School and Launceston Community Primary School (Windmill Hill Academy) cater for pupils aged 4 to 11.
- St. Joseph's School, St Stephens Hill is a private day school for boys and girls from age 3, going from nursery through the early years, junior department and into the senior school. The senior school boys and girls have been accepted into the sixth form from September 2012.
- Launceston College was first established in 1409 and became a boys grammar school with boarding house before becoming fully inclusive and educating students aged 11 to 18 or 19.

A former student of Launceston College was actor Sir Roger Moore. In 1962, Horwell Grammar School for Girls, Dunheved Road, was merged with the school, and in 1965 the former Pennygillam School was added to form the present-day comprehensive school, which is still known as Launceston College. Since the 19th century (exact date unknown) the college has been at the southern end of Dunheved Road, approximately one kilometre from the town centre. In 1966, H. Spencer Toy, its principal, published A History of Education at Launceston detailing the development of education in the town and surrounding area.

Launceston Community Primary School has the colloquial pseudonym Windmill Primary School, being situated adjacent to the site of the town's former windmill for grinding grain in Coronation Park.

== Transport ==
Launceston is no longer connected to the national railway network, but was for almost a century served by two railway lines. The Great Western Railway (GWR) branch from Plymouth terminated in the town and the London and South Western Railway (LSWR) Exeter to Padstow North Cornwall Railway passed through. The stations were adjacent. The GWR station closed to passengers in 1952 after which all trains used the LSWR station until the North Cornwall line closed in 1966. The site of the station has been redeveloped for light industrial use. Currently, the town is 10 miles (16 km) away from the nearest station at Gunnislake. The Launceston Steam Railway narrow-gauge heritage railway uses an adjacent site and runs for 2.5 miles (4.0 km) westward to Newmills along the valley of the Kensey.

The closest main-line railway stations to Launceston are Bodmin Parkway (24.1 miles (38.8 km) by car) and Plymouth (25.5 miles (41.0 km)). There are regular bus services to Plymouth and Exeter St Davids railway station.

== Notable residents ==
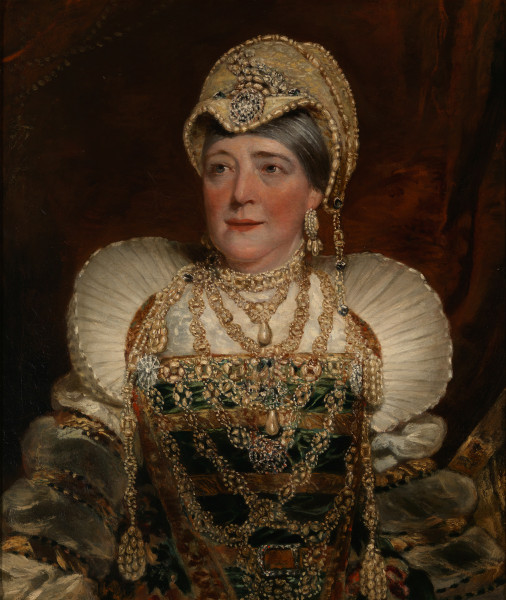
Mary Ann Davenport, 1818

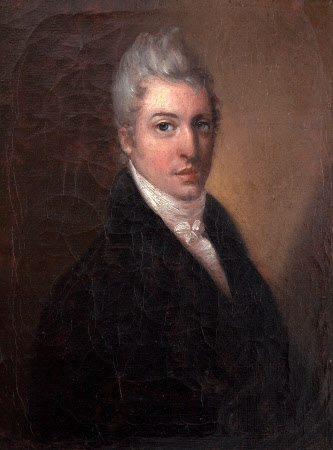
Francis Vyvyan Jago Arundell, 1815

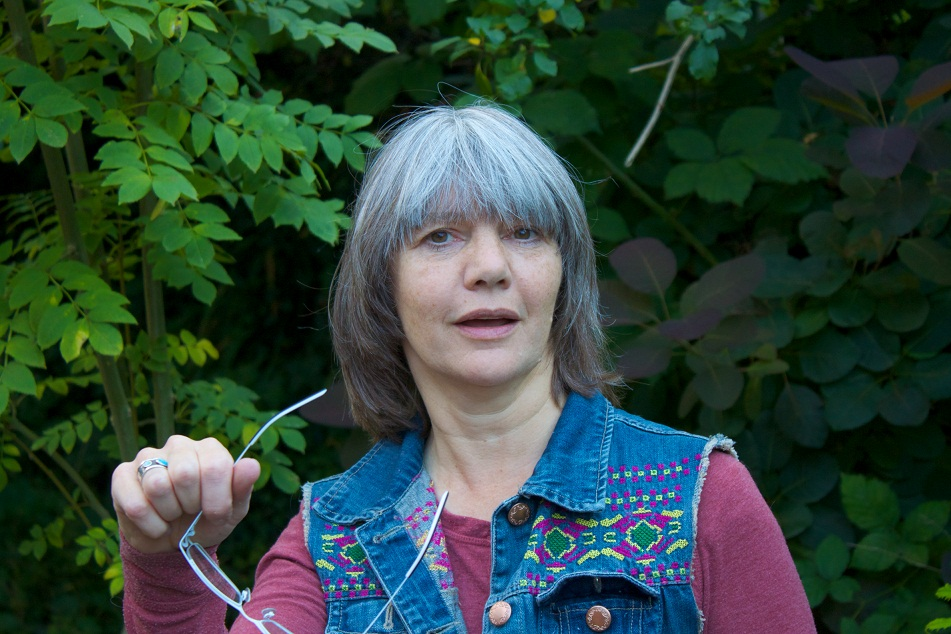
Pery Burge, 2012

- Agnes Prest (died 1557), a spinner, one of the Marian Martyrs, burned at the stake at Southernhay, Exeter on 15 August 1557
- Philip Gidley King (1758–1808), Royal Navy officer, colonial administrator, 3rd Governor of New South Wales from 1800 to 1806.
- Mary Ann Davenport (c. 1759 – 1843) a British Shakespearean actress.
- James Ruse (1759–1837), farmer aged 23, convicted of burglary and sentenced to 7 years' transportation, arrived Australia on Scarborough, part of the First Fleet of convict ships.
- James Willoughby Gordon (1772–1851), Quartermaster-General and local MP, 1830-1831.
- Francis Arundell (1780–1846), antiquary, Anglican clergyman, oriental traveller and Rector of Landulph.
- William Bowles (1780–1869), a senior Royal Navy officer, politician and local MP, 1844-1846.
- Henry Hardinge, 1st Viscount Hardinge (1785–1856), Army officer, politician and local MP, 1832-1844.
- Thomas Chandler Haliburton (1796–1865), a Nova Scotian politician, judge and local MP, 1859-1865.
- John Couch Adams (1819–1892), a British mathematician and astronomer, he predicted the existence and position of Neptune, using only mathematics.
- Hardinge Giffard, 1st Earl of Halsbury (1823–1921), barrister, politician, local MP from 1877, also served three times as Lord High Chancellor of Great Britain.
- Henry Lopes, 1st Baron Ludlow (1828–1899), a British judge, politician and local MP, 1868 to 1874.
- Sir Alfred Farthing Robbins (1856-1931), journalist, political biographer and freemason
- Frederick Nicholson Betts (1906–1973), coffee plantation manager, British Indian Army officer, political agent, and ornithologist
- Charles Causley (1917–2003), poet, school teacher and writer.
- Joan Rendell (1921–2010), the writer, historian and phillumenist, lived at nearby Yeolmbridge.
- John McGeoch (1955–2004) Scottish post-punk guitarist with Magazine & Siouxsie and the Banshees. lived and died locally
- Pery Burge (1955–2013), an artist who worked with abstract images using ink in water or ink on paper
- Grenville Davey (1961–2022), sculptor and winner of the 1992 Turner Prize.

=== Sport ===
- William Ellicott (1856–1933), sport shooter, bronze and silver team medallist at the 1908 Summer Olympics
- Derek Prout (1942-2005), rugby union player, played 41 games fir Northampton Saints and 2 for England
- Chris Harrison (born 1956), retired footballer, played 441 games, mainly for Plymouth Argyle
- Jimmy Tucker (born 1970), rugby union player who played 28 games for Exeter Chiefs and 50 for Cornwall
