= Launceston North and North Petherwin (electoral division) =

Electoral division of Cornwall in the UK

- Electoral district
- Launceston North and North Petherwin shown within Cornwall (click to zoom in)
- Country: England
- Sovereign state: United Kingdom
- UK Parliament: North Cornwall
- Councillors: Adam Paynter (Independent)

Launceston North and North Petherwin (Cornish: Lannstevan North ha Peder Wynn) is an electoral division of Cornwall in the United Kingdom and returns one member to sit on Cornwall Council. The current Councillor is Adam Paynter, an Independent and the council's Deputy Leader.

== Extent ==
Launceston North and North Petherwin covers the very north of the town of Launceston, including parts of the suburbs of St Stephen-by-Launceston and Lanstephan (which are both shared with Launceston Central division), as well as the villages of Yeolmbridge, Egloskerry, Langore, North Petherwin, Bennacott and Boyton, and the hamlets of Dutson, Ladycross, Kestle, Tregeare, Trebeath, Badharlick, Langdon, Hellescott, Billacott, Troswell, Brazacott, North Beer, Clubworthy, South Wheatley and Maxworthy. The village of Tregadillett is shared with the Stokeclimsland division. The division covers 10,233 hectares in total.

== Election results ==
=== 2017 election ===
2017 election: Launceston North and North Petherwin
Party	Candidate	Votes	%	±%
Liberal Democrats	Adam Paynter	1,007	53.2	
Conservative	Val Bugden-Cawsey	785	41.4	
Labour	Gill Brown	99	5.2	
Majority		222	11.7	
Rejected ballots		3	0.2	
Turnout		1894	51.0	
Liberal Democrats hold		Swing		

=== 2013 election ===
2013 election: Launceston North and North Petherwin
Party	Candidate	Votes	%	±%
Liberal Democrats	Adam Paynter	769	51.2	
UKIP	Graham Ford	364	24.2	
Conservative	Bill Sowerby	206	13.7	
Independent	Max Hailey	79	5.3	
Independent	Krystyna Zdan-Michajlowicz	73	4.9	
Majority		405	26.9	
Rejected ballots		12	0.8	
Turnout		1503	39.6	
Liberal Democrats win (new seat)				
