= List of United Kingdom locations: Cru-Cu =

The United Kingdom

This is part of the list of United Kingdom locations: a gazetteer of place names in the United Kingdom showing each place's locality and geographical coordinates.

== Cr (continued) ==
=== Cru ===
Location	Locality	Coordinates (links to map & photo sources)	OS grid reference
Cruckmeole	Shropshire	52.67°N 02.84°W	SJ4309
Cruckton	Shropshire	52.68°N 02.84°W	SJ4310
Cruden Bay	Aberdeenshire	57.41°N 01.85°W	NK0936
Crudgington	Shropshire	52.75°N 02.54°W	SJ6318
Crudwell	Wiltshire	51.62°N 02.07°W	ST9592
Crugmeer	Cornwall	50.54°N 04.96°W	SW9076
Crugybar	Carmarthenshire	52.01°N 03.96°W	SN6537
Cruise Hill	Worcestershire	52.26°N 02.00°W	SP0063
Crulabhig	Western Isles	58.19°N 06.81°W	NB1733
Crumlin	County Antrim	54.62°N 06.21°W	J1576
Crumlin	Caerphilly	51.67°N 03.14°W	ST2198
Crumplehorn	Cornwall	50.33°N 04.53°W	SX2051
Crumpsall	Manchester	53.51°N 02.24°W	SD8402
Crumpsbrook	Shropshire	52.39°N 02.55°W	SO6278
Crumpton Hill	Herefordshire	52.13°N 02.35°W	SO7648
Crundale	Kent	51.20°N 00.96°E	TR0749
Crundale	Pembrokeshire	51.82°N 04.94°W	SM9718
Cruwys Morchard	Devon	50.89°N 03.60°W	SS8712
Crux Easton	Hampshire	51.30°N 01.39°W	SU4256
Cruxton	Dorset	50.76°N 02.56°W	SY6096

=== Crw ===
Location	Locality	Coordinates (links to map & photo sources)	OS grid reference
Crwbin	Carmarthenshire	51.79°N 04.22°W	SN4713

=== Cry ===
Location	Locality	Coordinates (links to map & photo sources)	OS grid reference
Cryers Hill	Buckinghamshire	51.65°N 00.74°W	SU8796
Crymych	Pembrokeshire	51.96°N 04.65°W	SN1833
Crynant	Neath Port Talbot	51.72°N 03.75°W	SN7904
Crystal Palace	Bromley	51.430°N 00.071°W	TQ341708

== Cu ==
Location	Locality	Coordinates (links to map & photo sources)	OS grid reference
Cuaig	Highland	57.54°N 05.84°W	NG7057
Cuan	Argyll and Bute	56.26°N 05.63°W	NM7514
Cubbington	Warwickshire	52.30°N 01.50°W	SP3468
Cubeck	North Yorkshire	54.29°N 02.07°W	SD9589
Cubert	Cornwall	50.37°N 05.12°W	SW7857
Cubitt Town	Tower Hamlets	51.49°N 00.01°W	TQ3879
Cubley	Barnsley	53.51°N 01.63°W	SE2402
Cubley Common	Derbyshire	52.94°N 01.76°W	SK1639
Cublington	Buckinghamshire	51.89°N 00.79°W	SP8322
Cuckfield	West Sussex	51.00°N 00.14°W	TQ3024
Cucklington	Somerset	51.04°N 02.35°W	ST7527
Cuckney	Nottinghamshire	53.23°N 01.16°W	SK5671
Cuckold's Green	Suffolk	52.38°N 01.64°E	TM4882
Cuckold's Green	Wiltshire	51.31°N 02.03°W	ST9857
Cuckoo Green	Suffolk	52.53°N 01.69°E	TM5199
Cuckoo's Corner	Hampshire	51.16°N 00.94°W	SU7441
Cuckoo's Corner	Wiltshire	51.31°N 01.95°W	SU0357
Cuckoo's Knob	Wiltshire	51.35°N 01.72°W	SU1962
Cuckoo Tye	Suffolk	52.06°N 00.72°E	TL8744
Cuckron	Shetland Islands	60.24°N 01.27°W	HU4051
Cucumber Corner	Norfolk	52.59°N 01.51°E	TG3806
Cuddesdon	Oxfordshire	51.72°N 01.13°W	SP6003
Cuddington	Buckinghamshire	51.79°N 00.94°W	SP7311
Cuddington	Cheshire	53.23°N 02.61°W	SJ5971
Cuddington Heath	Cheshire	53.00°N 02.79°W	SJ4746
Cuddy Hill	Lancashire	53.82°N 02.77°W	SD4937
Cudham	Bromley	51.31°N 00.06°E	
Cudlipptown or Cudliptown	Devon	50.59°N 04.09°W	SX5279
Cudworth	Surrey	51.15°N 00.27°W	TQ2141
Cudworth	Somerset	50.88°N 02.89°W	ST3710
Cudworth	Barnsley	53.56°N 01.42°W	SE3808
Cudworth Common	Barnsley	53.55°N 01.41°W	SE3907
Cuerden Green	Lancashire	53.71°N 02.68°W	SD5524
Cuerdley Cross	Cheshire	53.37°N 02.69°W	SJ5487
Cufaude	Hampshire	51.30°N 01.08°W	SU6457
Cuffern	Pembrokeshire	51.84°N 05.06°W	SM8921
Cuffley	Hertfordshire	51.71°N 00.11°W	TL3003
Cuffurach	Moray	57.63°N 03.02°W	NJ3961
Cuidhtinis	Western Isles	57.77°N 06.89°W	NG0987
Cuidrach	Highland	57.54°N 06.39°W	NG3759
Cuiken	Midlothian	55.83°N 03.23°W	NT2361
Cuil	Highland	56.64°N 05.29°W	NM9855
Culbokie	Highland	57.59°N 04.34°W	NH6059
Culburnie	Highland	57.43°N 04.53°W	NH4841
Culcabock	Highland	57.46°N 04.20°W	NH6844
Culcharry	Highland	57.52°N 03.90°W	NH8650
Culcheth	Cheshire	53.45°N 02.52°W	SJ6595
Culduie	Highland	57.39°N 05.81°W	NG7140
Culford	Suffolk	52.29°N 00.68°E	TL8370
Culfordheath	Suffolk	52.33°N 00.71°E	TL8574
Culgaith	Cumbria	54.65°N 02.62°W	NY6029
Culham	Oxfordshire	51.65°N 01.27°W	SU5095
Culkein	Highland	58.24°N 05.35°W	NC0333
Culkein Drumbeg	Highland	58.24°N 05.22°W	NC1133
Culkerton	Gloucestershire	51.65°N 02.10°W	ST9395
Cullen	Moray	57.69°N 02.82°W	NJ5167
Cullercoats	North Tyneside	55.02°N 01.43°W	NZ3670
Cullicudden	Highland	57.64°N 04.26°W	NH6564
Cullingworth	Bradford	53.82°N 01.91°W	SE0636
Cullipool	Argyll and Bute	56.24°N 05.66°W	NM7312
Cullivoe	Shetland Islands	60.69°N 01.01°W	HP5402
Culloch	Perth and Kinross	56.33°N 03.97°W	NN7817
Culloden	Highland	57.48°N 04.15°W	NH7146
Cullompton	Devon	50.85°N 03.39°W	ST0207
Culm Davy	Devon	50.92°N 03.25°W	ST1215
Culmer	Surrey	51.14°N 00.65°W	SU9439
Culmers	Kent	51.32°N 00.94°E	TR0562
Culmington	Shropshire	52.43°N 02.75°W	SO4982
Culmore	Stirling	56.13°N 04.14°W	NS6796
Culmstock	Devon	50.90°N 03.28°W	ST1013
Culnacnoc	Highland	57.57°N 06.16°W	NG5162
Culpho	Suffolk	52.09°N 01.22°E	TM2149
Culrain	Highland	57.91°N 04.41°W	NH5794
Culrigrein or Coulregrein	Western Isles	58.22°N 06.37°W	NB4334
Culross	Fife	56.04°N 03.63°W	NS9885
Culroy	South Ayrshire	55.39°N 04.67°W	NS3114
Culswick	Shetland Islands	60.18°N 01.51°W	HU2745
Cults	City of Aberdeen	57.10°N 02.18°W	NJ8902
Cultybraggan	Perth and Kinross	56.34°N 04.00°W	NN7619
Culverlane	Devon	50.42°N 03.77°W	SX7460
Culverstone Green	Kent	51.33°N 00.33°E	TQ6362
Culverthorpe	Lincolnshire	52.94°N 00.48°W	TF0240
Culworth	Northamptonshire	52.10°N 01.21°W	SP5446
Cumberlow Green	Hertfordshire	51.95°N 00.10°W	TL3030
Cumbernauld	North Lanarkshire	55.94°N 03.98°W	NS7674
Cumbernauld Village	North Lanarkshire	55.96°N 03.98°W	NS7676
Cumber's Bank	Wrexham	52.94°N 02.83°W	SJ4439
Cumberworth	Lincolnshire	53.23°N 00.24°E	TF5073
Cumdivock	Cumbria	54.82°N 03.02°W	NY3448
Cumeragh Village	Lancashire	53.81°N 02.66°W	SD5636
Cuminestown	Aberdeenshire	57.54°N 02.33°W	NJ8050
Cumledge	Scottish Borders	55.79°N 02.33°W	NT7956
Cumlewick	Shetland Islands	59.98°N 01.24°W	HU4222
Cummersdale	Cumbria	54.86°N 02.96°W	NY3853
Cummertrees	Dumfries and Galloway	54.98°N 03.34°W	NY1466
Cummings Park	City of Aberdeen	57.16°N 02.15°W	NJ9108
Cummingston	Moray	57.69°N 03.46°W	NJ1368
Cumnock	East Ayrshire	55.44°N 04.26°W	NS5719
Cumnor	Oxfordshire	51.73°N 01.33°W	SP4604
Cumnor Hill	Oxfordshire	51.74°N 01.32°W	SP4705
Cumrew	Cumbria	54.84°N 02.71°W	NY5450
Cumwhinton	Cumbria	54.86°N 02.85°W	NY4552
Cumwhitton	Cumbria	54.86°N 02.78°W	NY5052
Cundall	North Yorkshire	54.14°N 01.35°W	SE4272
Cundy Cross	Barnsley	53.54°N 01.44°W	SE3706
Cundy Hos	Barnsley	53.46°N 01.53°W	SK3197
Cunninghamhead	North Ayrshire	55.63°N 04.59°W	NS3741
Cunnister	Shetland Islands	60.64°N 01.05°W	HU5296
Cupar	Fife	56.31°N 03.02°W	NO3714
Cupar Muir	Fife	56.30°N 03.03°W	NO3613
Cupernham	Hampshire	50.99°N 01.48°W	SU3622
Cupid Green	Hertfordshire	51.76°N 00.45°W	TL0709
Cupid's Hill	Monmouthshire	51.92°N 02.87°W	SO4025
Curbar	Derbyshire	53.26°N 01.62°W	SK2574
Curborough	Staffordshire	52.70°N 01.82°W	SK1212
Curbridge	Hampshire	50.89°N 01.26°W	SU5211
Curbridge	Oxfordshire	51.76°N 01.52°W	SP3308
Curdridge	Hampshire	50.91°N 01.24°W	SU5313
Curdworth	Birmingham	52.52°N 01.75°W	SP1792
Curgurrell	Cornwall	50.19°N 04.97°W	SW8837
Curland	Somerset	50.94°N 03.04°W	ST2717
Curland Common	Somerset	50.94°N 03.04°W	ST2717
Curlew Green	Suffolk	52.23°N 01.48°E	TM3865
Curling Tye Green	Essex	51.73°N 00.63°E	TL8207
Curload	Somerset	51.04°N 02.94°W	ST3428
Currian Vale	Cornwall	50.37°N 04.87°W	SW9657
Curridge	Berkshire	51.43°N 01.31°W	SU4871
Currie	City of Edinburgh	55.88°N 03.31°W	NT1867
Currock	Cumbria	54.87°N 02.93°W	NY4054
Curry Lane	Cornwall	50.71°N 04.42°W	SX2993
Curry Mallet	Somerset	50.98°N 02.97°W	ST3221
Curry Rivel	Somerset	51.02°N 02.87°W	ST3925
Cursiter	Orkney Islands	58.99°N 03.09°W	HY3712
Curteis' Corner	Kent	51.12°N 00.64°E	TQ8539
Curtisden Green	Kent	51.13°N 00.48°E	TQ7440
Curtisknowle	Devon	50.36°N 03.78°W	SX7353
Curtismill Green	Essex	51.64°N 00.18°E	TQ5196
Cury	Cornwall	50.04°N 05.25°W	SW6721
Cusbay	Orkney Islands	59.21°N 02.79°W	HY5537
Cusgarne	Cornwall	50.21°N 05.15°W	SW7540
Cushuish	Somerset	51.06°N 03.15°W	ST1930
Cusop	Herefordshire	52.06°N 03.12°W	SO2341
Custards	Hampshire	50.87°N 01.58°W	SU2908
Custom House	Newham	51.51°N 00.03°E	TQ4181
Cusveorth Coombe	Cornwall	50.24°N 05.14°W	SW7643
Cusworth	Doncaster	53.53°N 01.18°W	SE5404
Cutcombe	Somerset	51.14°N 03.54°W	SS9239
Cutgate	Rochdale	53.62°N 02.21°W	SD8614
Cuthill	East Lothian	55.95°N 02.99°W	NT3874
Cutiau	Gwynedd	52.73°N 04.03°W	SH6317
Cutlers Green	Essex	51.94°N 00.31°E	TL5930
Cutler's Green	Somerset	51.26°N 02.58°W	ST5952
Cutmadoc	Cornwall	50.43°N 04.69°W	SX0963
Cutmere	Cornwall	50.41°N 04.36°W	SX3260
Cutnall Green	Worcestershire	52.31°N 02.19°W	SO8768
Cutsdean	Gloucestershire	51.96°N 01.88°W	SP0830
Cutsyke	Wakefield	53.71°N 01.36°W	SE4224
Cutteslowe	Oxfordshire	51.78°N 01.27°W	SP5010
Cutthorpe	Derbyshire	53.25°N 01.49°W	SK3473
Cuttiford's Door	Somerset	50.88°N 02.96°W	ST3210
Cuttybridge	Pembrokeshire	51.83°N 05.00°W	SM9319
Cuttyhill	Aberdeenshire	57.54°N 01.93°W	NK0450
Cuxham	Oxfordshire	51.65°N 01.04°W	SU6695
Cuxton	Kent	51.36°N 00.44°E	TQ7066
Cuxwold	Lincolnshire	53.49°N 00.23°W	TA1701
