= Grade I listed buildings in Torridge =

There are over 9,000 Grade I listed buildings in England. This page is a list of these buildings in the district of Torridge in Devon.

== Torridge ==
Name	Location	Type	Completed (Note: The date given is the date used by Historic England as significant for the initial building or that of an important part in the structure's description.)	Date designated	Grid ref. (Note: The grid reference is based on the British national grid reference system, sometimes known as OSGB36, used by the Ordnance Survey.) Geo-coordinates	Entry number (Note: The "List Entry Number" is a unique number assigned to each listed building and scheduled monument by Historic England.)	Image
Church of St Andrew	Alwington, Torridge	Anglican Church	17th century	20 February 1958	SS4046923157; 50°59′08″N 4°16′27″W	1170749	Church of St Andrew More images
Church of St Peter	Ashwater, Torridge	Parish Church	14th century or earlier	14 February 1985	SX3868395234; 50°44′03″N 4°17′14″W	1164568	Church of St Peter More images
Church of Saint George and All Saints	Beaford, Torridge	Parish Church	Late 15th century	4 October 1960	SS5521015007; 50°54′59″N 4°03′40″W	1105078	Church of Saint George and All Saints More images
Bideford Bridge including Parapet Walls and Gates of East Abutment	Bideford, Torridge	Bridge	Late 13th century timbers	8 November 1949	SS4556926427; 51°00′59″N 4°12′11″W	1200873	Bideford Bridge including Parapet Walls and Gates of East Abutment More images
The Royal Hotel	East the Water, Bideford, Torridge	House	17th century	8 November 1949	SS4571326405; 51°00′59″N 4°12′03″W	1200870	The Royal Hotel More images
Church of St Bridget	Bridgerule, Torridge	Anglican Church	1723	14 February 1958	SS2812003168; 50°48′09″N 4°26′26″W	1104976	Church of St Bridget More images
Church of St Nicholas	Broadwoodwidger, Torridge	Parish Church	12th century	23 August 1957	SX4112989179; 50°40′50″N 4°15′00″W	1333032	Church of St Nicholas More images
Orleigh Court	Buckland Brewer, Torridge	Flats	1982	22 January 1952	SS4297322255; 50°58′42″N 4°14′18″W	1170935	Orleigh Court More images
Church of St Leonard	Churchtown, Clawton, Torridge	Sundial	1634	14 February 1958	SX3485899261; 50°46′10″N 4°20′36″W	1104685	Church of St Leonard More images
Church of All Saints	Clovelly Court Park, Clovelly, Torridge	Anglican Church	15th century	20 February 1958	SS3097525135; 51°00′03″N 4°24′37″W	1333106	Church of All Saints More images
Church of St Peter	Dowland, Torridge	Parish Church	Norman	4 October 1960	SS5679910315; 50°52′28″N 4°02′12″W	1309370	Church of St Peter More images
Church of St Mary and St Gregory	Frithelstock, Torridge	Church	1741	4 October 1960	SS4636419546; 50°57′17″N 4°11′20″W	1105177	Church of St Mary and St Gregory More images
Ruins of Priory Church	Frithelstock, Torridge	Lady Chapel	c. 1330	4 October 1960	SS4639919565; 50°57′18″N 4°11′18″W	1326508	Ruins of Priory Church More images
Church of St Nectan	Stoke, Hartland, Torridge	Collegiate Church	c. 1050	20 February 1958	SS2350324743; 50°59′42″N 4°30′59″W	1333125	Church of St Nectan More images
Hartland Abbey	Abbey Park, Hartland, Torridge	Abbey	c. 1175	22 January 1952	SS2405324874; 50°59′47″N 4°30′31″W	1104440	Hartland Abbey More images
Church of Saint Mary	High Bickington, Torridge	Parish Church	12th century	4 October 1960	SS5992020524; 50°58′01″N 3°59′47″W	1326598	Church of Saint Mary More images
Church of St Swithun	Littleham, Torridge	Church	Mid 13th century	20 February 1958	SS4435423503; 50°59′23″N 4°13′09″W	1105152	Church of St Swithun More images
Church of St James	Luffincott, Torridge	Parish Church	May be 13th century	14 February 1958	SX3323894654; 50°43′39″N 4°21′51″W	1161919	Church of St James More images
Great Potheridge	Great Potheridge, Merton, Torridge	Farmhouse	Post 19th century	16 January 1952	SS5137714665; 50°54′44″N 4°06′56″W	1147436	Great Potheridge More images
Church of St George	Monkleigh, Torridge	Church	Early 15th century	20 February 1958	SS4575620718; 50°57′55″N 4°11′53″W	1305679	Church of St George More images
Church of St Margaret	Northam, Torridge	Parish Church	Older	15 June 1951	SS4487429099; 51°02′25″N 4°12′51″W	1169270	Church of St Margaret More images
Church of the Holy Cross	Tetcott, Torridge	Parish Church	13th century	14 February 1958	SX3321296510; 50°44′39″N 4°21′55″W	1252173	Church of the Holy Cross More images
Church of the Holy Trinity	Weare Giffard, Torridge	Anglican Church	Late 19th century	4 October 1960	SS4672622134; 50°58′41″N 4°11′05″W	1171583	Church of the Holy Trinity More images
Gatehouse Approx 15m to SE of Weare Giffard Hall	Weare Giffard, Torridge	Gatehouse	Late 15th century	16 January 1952	SS4667922101; 50°58′40″N 4°11′07″W	1105108	Gatehouse Approx 15m to SE of Weare Giffard Hall More images
Weare Giffard Hall	Weare Giffard, Torridge	House	After 1454	16 January 1952	SS4666822132; 50°58′41″N 4°11′08″W	1171633	Weare Giffard Hall More images
Church of St Stephen	West Putford, Torridge	Anglican Church	1620	14 February 1958	SS3589615659; 50°55′01″N 4°20′09″W	1164596	Church of St Stephen More images
Church of All Saints	Winkleigh, Torridge	Parish Church	Early 14th century	4 October 1960	SS6327408062; 50°51′21″N 3°56′38″W	1318120	Church of All Saints More images
Church of All Hallows	Woolfardisworthy, Torridge	Anglican Church	Norman	20 February 1958	SS3321921084; 50°57′54″N 4°22′35″W	1333152	Church of All Hallows More images

== See also ==
- Grade II* listed buildings in Torridge
