= Broadwoodwidger Rural District =

Defunct administrative area of Devon, England

Coordinates: 50.645°N 4.380°W

Broadwoodwidger was a rural district in the administrative county of Devon from 1894 to 1966, northeast of Launceston. The district consisted of part of the Launceston rural sanitary district in Devon. The remainder of the sanitary district became Launceston Rural District in Cornwall.

The rural district comprised six civil parishes:

- Broadwoodwidger
- Northcott
- North Petherwin
- St Giles on the Heath
- Virginstow
- Werrington

Part of the rural district lay west of the River Tamar, forming a salient surrounded by Cornwall on three sides. The county boundary was realigned when the district was abolished in 1966 by the Local Government Commission for England (1958–1967), with two parishes, North Petherwin and the majority of Werrington being transferred to Cornwall with the remaining four parishes in Devon and passing to the Holsworthy Rural District.

== See also ==
- Local Government Commission for England (1958–1967)
- Historic Counties of England
