= Curbridge =

Curbridge may refer to:

- Curbridge, Hampshire
- Curbridge, Oxfordshire
