= South Wheatley =

South Wheatley may refer to the following places in England:

- South Wheatley, Nottinghamshire
- South Wheatley, Cornwall

== See also ==
- Wheatley (disambiguation)
