= St Stephens by Launceston Rural =

Civil parish in Cornwall, England

Coordinates: 50.652°N 4.405°W

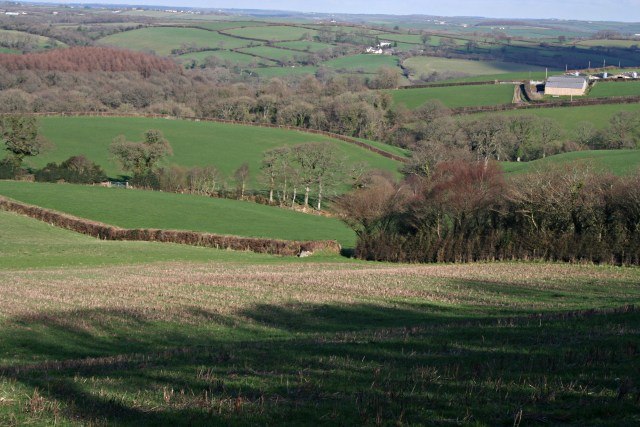
- Farmland west of Langore

- Location within Cornwall
- Population: 350 (Parish, 2021)
- Civil parish: St Stephens by Launceston Rural
- Unitary authority: Cornwall
- Ceremonial county: Cornwall
- Region: South West
- Country: England
- Sovereign state: United Kingdom
- Post town: LAUNCESTON
- Postcode district: PL15

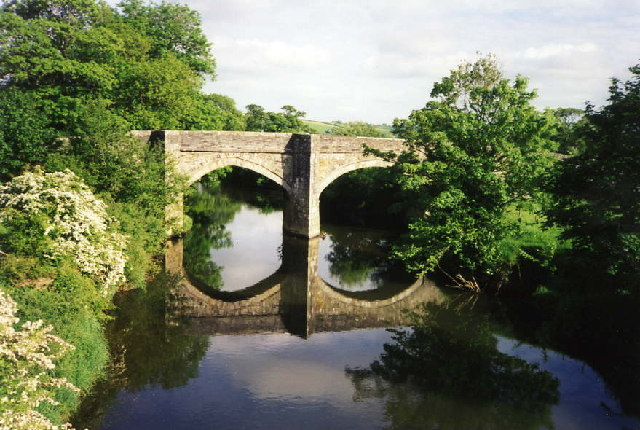
Higher New Bridge over the River Tamar on the eastern boundary of the parish

St Stephens by Launceston Rural is a civil parish in the east of Cornwall, England, United Kingdom. The modern parish was created in 1894 from the part of the ancient parish of St Stephen, also known as St Stephens by Launceston, which lay outside the borough boundaries of Launceston. The parish remains largely rural, with its main settlements being the hamlets of Dutson, Langore, and Truscott. At the 2021 census the population of the parish was 350.

The parish lies immediately north-west of the town of Launceston and is bounded to the south by the parishes of Launceston, St Thomas the Apostle Rural, and Lawhitton. To the east it is bounded by the River Tamar (the border between Cornwall and Devon). To the north and north-west it is bordered by the parishes of Werrington, North Petherwin and Egloskerry.

== History ==
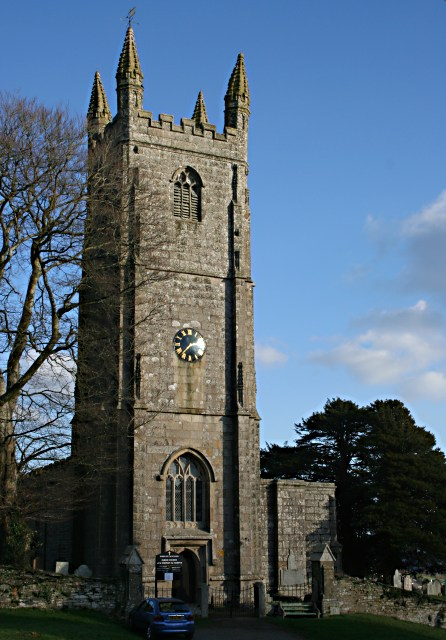
St Stephen's Church

In Anglo-Saxon times there was a monastery here dedicated to St Stephen whose canons owned the surrounding land including the town of Launceston (i.e. Lan-stefan-ton) (the name did not then belong to Dunheved the present town). A mint was established here as early as the reign of Aethelred II, 976, but only one specimen is known to exist (it weighs 1.61g). However, after the Norman Conquest the Norman Earl acquired Dunheved and rebuilt the castle there. He expropriated the market and mint of the canons and the townspeople followed them to Dunheved. (The name of Launceston belonged originally to the monastery and town here, but was then transferred to the town of Dunheved.) The church of St Stephen retained its importance and remained the mother church of many of the surrounding parishes, Tremaine, Egloskerry, Tresmeer, Werrington, St Giles, Laneast, St Thomas, St Mary Magdalene and others throughout the Middle Ages.

From 1850 the more urban part of the parish around Newport and the settlement around St Stephen's Church were included in the Launceston local board district, established to provide local government services including water supply and drainage for the Launceston urban area. The borough of Dunheved, otherwise Launceston was enlarged to match the local board district in 1889.

The Local Government Act 1894 directed that civil parishes were no longer allowed to straddle borough boundaries, and so the parish of St Stephens was split into a St Stephens by Launceston Urban parish covering the parts inside the borough, including the old settlement of St Stephen's around the parish church, and a St Stephens by Launceston Rural parish covering the rural parts of the old parish outside the borough. The urban parishes within the borough were subsequently united into a single parish of Dunheved, otherwise Launceston, in 1922.

== Notable buildings ==
The parish church, dedicated to St Stephen, is within the northern outskirts of the town of Launceston at grid reference SX 324 857. The church's buttressed and battlemented tower (16th century) houses a ring of six bells. The church was built in the early 13th century after the monastery which had been on this site had moved into the valley near the castle. The old tower was demolished by Reginald Earl of Cornwall. The present fine tower was built in the 16th century; the font is Norman. On the Tamar at Yeolmbridge is the oldest bridge in Cornwall: it has two pointed arches and the roadway has been widened in modern times.

== Governance ==
There are two tiers of local government covering St Stephens by Launceston Rural, at parish and unitary authority level: St Stephens by Launceston Rural Parish Council and Cornwall Council. The parish council generally meets at Langore Village Hall.

== Cornish wrestling ==
St Stephens hosted Cornish wrestling tournaments in the 1800s.

== Notable residents ==
- Joan Rendell, historian, resided at Yeolmbridge in the latter part of her life.
