= St Stephens, Cornwall =

St Stephens, Cornwall or St Stephen, Cornwall may refer to:

- St Stephen-in-Brannel, a village near St Austell, Cornwall.
- St Stephen-by-Launceston, near Launceston.
- St Stephens by Saltash, near Saltash.
