= List of shipwrecks in March 1875 =

The list of shipwrecks in March 1875 includes ships sunk, foundered, grounded, or otherwise lost during March 1875.

== 1 March ==
List of shipwrecks: 1 March 1875
Ship	State	Description
Australia	United Kingdom	The steamship ran aground at Hawkins Point, Baltimore, Maryland, United States. She was on a voyage from Galveston, Texas, United States to Liverpool, Lancashire.
Copious	United Kingdom	The ship was driven ashore at Girvan, Ayrshire.
Flying Spray	United Kingdom	The paddle tug was run into by the steam lighter Leopold (United Kingdom) at Port Glasgow, Renfrewshire and was beached in a sinking condition.
Franconia	Germany	The steamship ran aground in the Elbe near Schulau. She was on a voyage from the West Indies to Hamburg. She was refloated on 9 March and taken in to Hamburg.
Ida	United Kingdom	The ship was driven ashore in Dundalk Bay. She was on a voyage from Troon, Ayrshire to Dundalk, County Louth.
Maraldi	United Kingdom	The steamship was run ashore at Bahia, Brazil. She was on a voyage from the River Plate to Liverpool.
Matthanja	Norway	The barque collided with Zanzibar (United Kingdom) and sank in the English Channel 30 nautical miles (56 km) off Start Point, Devon, United Kingdom. Her crew were rescued by Zanzibar. Matthanja was on a voyage from Stavanger to Trapani, Sicily, Italy.
Melbourne	Victoria	The 53-ton schooner sailed from Lyttelton Harbour, New Zealand. Wreckage from the ship was discovered in mid-March close to the northwestern tip of the South Island and two bodies, one believed to have been of the ship's captain, were found washed ashore on Farewell Spit towards the end of the month.
Newton	United Kingdom	The steamship ran aground in the Elbe between Glückstadt and "Stohr". She was refloated with assistance from the steamship Enock (Flag unknown).

== 2 March ==
List of shipwrecks: 2 March 1875
Ship	State	Description
Madge Wildfire	United Kingdom	The schooner ran aground at Cairnryan, Wigtownshire. She was on a voyage from Liverpool, Lancashire to Glasgow, Renfrewshire.
Panther	United Kingdom	The steamship ran aground in the Elbe between Lühe and Schulau.
Peri	United Kingdom	The brig was driven ashore on St Martin's, Isles of Scilly. She was on a voyage from Bône, Algeria to Swansea, Glamorgan. She was refloated and taken in to St Mary's, Isles of Scilly.
Seagull	United Kingdom	The ship ran aground in "St. John's River", Natal Colony.
The Princess	United Kingdom	The steamship foundered off Calais, France with the loss of seven of her seventeen crew. Survivors were rescued by the fishing smack Confidence en Dieu (France). The Princess was on a voyage from Antwerp, Belgium to London.

== 3 March ==
List of shipwrecks: 3 March 1875
Ship	State	Description
Modeste	France	The ship was wrecked on the East Mouse Sand, in the Thames Estuary. Her crew were rescued by a Dutch galiot. She was on a voyage from Dunkirk, Nord to London, United Kingdom.
Pequot	United States	The ship was wrecked 40 nautical miles (74 km) north of Maceió, Brazil. She was on a voyage from Rio de Janeiro, Brazil to Pensacola, Florida.

== 4 March ==
List of shipwrecks: 4 March 1875
Ship	State	Description
Giovanni	Italy	The barque was wrecked on Cape Cod, Massachusetts, United States with the loss of fifteen of her sixteen crew. She was on a voyage from Palermo, Sicily to Boston, Massachusetts.
Mercator	United Kingdom	The steamship ran aground at Harwich, Essex. She was on a voyage from Poti, Russia to Harwich. She was refloated.

== 5 March ==
List of shipwrecks: 5 March 1875
Ship	State	Description
Adelaide	United Kingdom	The medium clipper ran aground in the Potomac River. She was on a voyage from Rio de Janeiro, Brazil to Baltimore, Maryland, United States.
Agnes	United Kingdom	The schooner was driven ashore at Lindisfarne, Northumberland. She was refloated with the assistance of a tug.
Giovanni	Italy	The barque was wrecked on Cape Cod, Massachusetts, United States with the loss of fifteen of her sixteen crew. She was on a voyage from Palermo, Sicily to Boston, Massachusetts.
Holsatia	Germany	The ship ran aground in the Elbe at "Neumühle".
J. R. Hea	United States	The ship was abandoned in the Atlantic Ocean. Her crew were rescued by Colorado (United States). J. R. Hea was on a voyage from Baltimore, Maryland to Queenstown, County Cork, United Kingdom.
Pride of the Thames	China	The barque was wrecked on the Mitsulze Rocks, 12 nautical miles (22 km) from Nagasaki, Japan. Her crew were rescued. She was on a voyage from Nagasaki to Yokohama, Japan.
Souvenir	Norway	The barque ran aground on the Scarweaterh Sands, in the Bristol Channel. Her crew were rescued by the pilot boat Vigilant (United Kingdom). She was on a voyage from Lillesand to Cardiff, Glamorgan, United Kingdom. Souvenir capsized and drove out to sea. She was discovered the next day by the pilot cutter Rose Emma (United Kingdom. Souvenir was righted and towed in to Llanelly, Glamorgan.

== 6 March ==
List of shipwrecks: 6 March 1875
Ship	State	Description
Eider	United Kingdom	The steamship collided with the barque Avalanche (United Kingdom) in the English Channel off Start Point, Devon and was severely damaged. Eider was on a voyage from Southampton, Hampshire to the West Indies. She put back to Southampton for repairs.
Marie Westendorf	Denmark	The ship was abandoned in the Atlantic Ocean. Her crew were rescued by Aramis (France). Marie Westendorf was on a voyage from Pensacola, Florida to Svendborg.

== 7 March ==
List of shipwrecks: 7 March 1875
Ship	State	Description
Cesare Becarria, and Conservator	Italy; United Kingdom	The steamship Conservator was run down and sunk by the barque Cesare Becarria off Flamborough Head, Yorkshire. Her twenty crew were rescued by the. steamship Berwick (United Kingdom). Conservator was on a voyage from the River Tyne to London. Cesare Becarria was severely damaged. She put in to Filey Bay but ran aground on the Filey Brigg and was severely damaged. She was beached south of Scarborough, Yorkshire. Her crew survived. She was on a voyage from London to South Shields, County Durham, United Kingdom.
China	United Kingdom	The ship ran aground on the Cross Sand, in the North Sea off the coast of Norfolk. Her 22 crew were rescued by the Caister Lifeboat The Boys ( Royal National Lifeboat Institution). China was on a voyage from London to the River Tyne. She was refloated with the assistance of The Boys and some tugs.
Janie Banfield	United Kingdom	The brig was wrecked on Nisyros, Greece. Her crew were rescued.
J. J.	United Kingdom	The steamship was wrecked on the Carr Rock, in the Firth of Forth with the loss of a crew member. She was on a voyage from Tayport, Fife to Middlesbrough, Yorkshire.

== 8 March ==
List of shipwrecks: 8 March 1875
Ship	State	Description
Argus	France	The smack ran aground at Rye, Sussex, United Kingdom. She was refloated and taken in to Rye in a waterlogged condition.
Annie McJannet	United Kingdom	The schooner was driven ashore and wrecked in Church Bay, County Cork. She was on a voyage from Queenstown, County Cork to Irvine, Ayrshire.
Benbow	United Kingdom	The steamship was driven ashore at St. Margaret's Bay, Kent. She was on a voyage from the Charente to London. She was refloated with the assistance of the tug Palmerston (United Kingdom).
British Hero	United Kingdom	The paddle tug was run into and sunk at Hull, Yorkshire by the steamship Manchester (United Kingdom). British Hero was refloated the next day.
Clutha	United Kingdom	The steamship was driven ashrore 3 nautical miles (5.6 km) east of Port Talbot, Glamorgan. She was refloated on 6 April with the assistance of a tug and taken in to Swansea, Glamorgan.
Columbus	United Kingdom	The schooner was run down and sunk in Liverpool Bay 1 nautical mile (1.9 km) south south east of the Crosby Lightship ( Trinity House) by the steamship Adriatic) (United Kingdom) with the loss of one of the eight people on board. Survivors were rescued by the steamship Enterprise (United Kingdom). Columbus was on a voyage from Fowey, Cornwall to Runcorn, Cheshire.
Eugene	France	The yacht was wrecked at St. Jean d'Acre, Ottoman Syria with the loss of all hands.
Fairlina	United Kingdom	The ship departed from Sunderland, County Durham for Limerick. No further trace, presumed foundered with the loss of all hands.
Hannah Coppack	United Kingdom	The ship was driven ashore at Ayr. She was on a voyage from Portrush, County Antrim to Ayr.
Hilda	United Kingdom	The cutter ran aground on the Jordan Flats, in Liverpool Bay. Her crew were rescued by the tug Great Conquest (United Kingdom). Hilda was on a voyage from Beaumaris, Anglesey to Liverpool, Lancashire.
Hooghly	France	The steamship ran aground at Wusong, China. She was refloated.
Juno	United Kingdom	The sloop was wrecked on the Navestone, in the Farne Islands, Northumberland. Her crew were rescued by the full-rigged ship Edinburgh (United Kingdom).
Ocean Wave	United Kingdom	The schooner was driven ashore at St. Margaret's Bay. She was on a voyage from Genoa, Italy to London. She was refloated and taken in to The Downs.
Pride	United Kingdom	The ship departed from Sunderland for Southampton, Hampshire. No further trace, presumed foundered with the loss of all hands.
Prince Eugene	(United Kingdom of Great Britain and Ireland) Guernsey	The schooner was driven ashore at Selsey Bill, Sussex and was abandoned by her crew. She was on a voyage from Guernsey to Shoreham-by-Sea, Sussex. She was refloated and taken in to Portsmouth, Hampshire with the assistance of a tug. Subsequently placed under repair.
Rieta	United States	The brigantine was driven ashore and wrecked in Church Bay. She was on a voyage from Baltimore, Maryland to Queenstown.
Sarah Richardson	United Kingdom	The ship sank in the River Tyne.
Victoria	United Kingdom	The steamship was severely damaged by fire at South Shields, County Durham.
Wyk-Van-Zee	Netherlands	The ship ran aground on the Ridge Sand. She was on a voyage from Java, Netherlands East Indies to Amsterdam, North Holland. She was refloated and taken in to The Downs in a leaky condition.
Unnamed	Flag unknown	The ship sank in Liverpool Bay.

== 9 March ==
List of shipwrecks: 9 March 1875
Ship	State	Description
Billow	United Kingdom	The schooner was abandoned in a sinking condition. Her crew were rescued by Sympathy (Netherlands). Billow was on a voyage from "Duranso" to Hayle, Cornwall.
British Queen	United Kingdom	The schooner was driven onto the Ark Rocks, off Bamburgh, Northumberland and was wrecked. Her crew were rescued. She was on a voyage from Berwick upon Tweed to Blyth, Northumberland.
Cairngowrie	United Kingdom	The schooner was driven ashore and wrecked near Bamburgh Castle, Northumberland. Her crew were rescued by the Bamburgh Lifeboat.
Cock-a-Leekie	United Kingdom	The schooner was driven ashore north of Girvan, Ayrshire. She was refloated and taken in to Girvan in a waterlogged condition.
Colombo	United Kingdom	The barque was wrecked at St. Jean d'Acre, Ottoman Syria. Her crew were rescued.
Columbus	United States	The ship was rammed and sunk by the White Star Line ocean liner Adriatic (United Kingdom) in the Crosby Channel at Liverpool, Lancashire, United Kingdom.
Dunphail Castle	United Kingdom	The ship caught fire in the West India Docks, London and was scuttled.
Economy	United Kingdom	The brig was abandoned off Filey, Yorkshire. Her five crew were rescued by fishing boats. She was on a voyage from Folkestone, Kent to Scarborough, Yorkshire. Economy came ashore at Reighton, Yorkshire and was wrecked.
Eliza McLaughlan	Canada	The ship was driven ashore at West Hartlepool, County Durham, United Kingdom. She was on a voyage from Doboy, Georgia, United States to West Hartlepool. She was refloated with the assistance of three tugs and taken in to West Hartlepool, where she sank.
Energy	United Kingdom	The fishing smack was driven ashore and wrecked at North Shields, Northumberland. Her crew were rescued by the North Shields Lifeboat Noble ( Royal National Lifeboat Institution).
Grace Carry	United Kingdom	The fishing smack was driven ashore and wrecked at the Cloch Lighthouse, Renfrewshire. She was on a voyage from Teignmouth, Devon to Glasgow, Renfrewshire.
James Irvine	United Kingdom	The ship was wrecked at Portpatrick, Wigtownshire. She was on a voyage from Dublin to Campbeltown, Argyllshire.
Nada	United Kingdom	The steamship was driven ashore on the Île d'Yeu, Vendée, France. She was on a voyage from the Clyde to Bordeaux, Gironde, France. She was refloated on 26 April and beached. Nada was refloated on 6 May and taken in tow for Saint-Nazaire, Ille-et-Vilaine but sank off the mouth of the Loire. Her crew survived.
Osprey	United Kingdom	The sloop was beached at Spittal, Northumberland. Both crew were rescued by the Berwick upon Tweed Lifeboat Albert Victor ( Royal National Lifeboat Institution). Osprey was on a voyage from Newcastle upon Tyne, Northumberland to Dunbar, Lothian. She subsequently broke up.
Prince of Waterloo	United Kingdom	The schooner ran aground on the Spencer Spit, at the mouth of the River Mersey, and sank with the loss of two of her four crew. Survivors were rescued by the Hoylake Lifeboat. She was on a voyage from Wicklow to Woodend.
Salvadora	Spain	The ship ran aground at Venus.
Sarah Hughes	United Kingdom	The ship was driven ashore and severely damaged at Maryport, Cumberland. Her crew were rescued. She was on a voyage from Maryport to Ardglass, County Down.
Thomas Bayne	United Kingdom	The full-rigged ship was wrecked off "Rakudes", on the Somali coast. Her crew survived. She was on a voyage from Aden to Bassein, India.
Urania	United Kingdom	The ship was driven ashore at Greystones, County Wicklow. Her crew survived. She was on a voyage from Dublin to Whitehaven, Cumberland.
Victorine	France	The barque was wrecked on Sylt, Germany. Her crew were rescued. She was on a voyage from Havre de Grâce, Seine-Inférieure to Hamburg, Germany.
Three unnamed vessels	United Kingdom	A schooner and two smacks were driven ashore on Holy Isle, in the Firth of Forth.
Unnamed	United Kingdom	The ship foundered off Souter Point, Northumberland. Her crew were rescued by the paddle tugs Balmoral and Vans (both United Kingdom), which was towing the ship from the River Tees to the River Tyne.
Unnamed	United Kingdom	The pilot boat, a coble, capsized off Bamburgh with the loss of all five crew.

== 10 March ==
List of shipwrecks: 10 March 1875
Ship	State	Description
David Boyd	United Kingdom	The ship ran aground on the San Gabriel Reef. off Colonia, Yap, Captaincy General of the Philippines. She was on a voyage from Portland, Dorset to Colonia.
Driving Mist	United Kingdom	The ship was driven ashore at Padstow, Cornwall. She was on a voyage from Neath, Glamorgan to Newquay, Cornwall. She was refloated the next day.
Emanuel	Denmark	The galiot was driven ashore and wrecked on Skagen. Her crew were rescued. She was on a voyage from Ærøskøbing to "Cappelm".
Emily Quigley	United Kingdom	The Yorkshire Billyboy was driven ashore in the River Carron. She was on a voyage from Grangemouth, Stirlingshire to Colchester, Essex.
Energy	United Kingdom	The fishing trawler was driven ashore at South Shields, County Durham. Her five crew were rescued by the steamship Providence (United Kingdom) and the South Shields Lifeboat.
Eugenie	United Kingdom	The brigantine was driven ashore at Margate, Kent. She was refloated and taken in to Ramsgate, Kent.
Pomona	France	The ship was driven ashore on Texel, North Holland, Netherlands. She was on a voyage from Bordeaux, Gironde to Bremerhaven, Germany.
Rambler	United Kingdom	The ship was abandoned in the Bristol Channel. She was subsequently towed in to Llanelly, Glamorgan.
Unnamed	United Kingdom	The lighter foundered off Souter Point, Northumberland. Her four crew were rescued by the tug Venus (United Kingdom), which was towing her from the River Tees to South Shields.
Unnamed	United Kingdom	The brig capsized in the North Sea off the coast of County Durham.

== 11 March ==
List of shipwrecks: 11 March 1875
Ship	State	Description
Commodore	United Kingdom	The brig ran aground on the Blacktail Sand, in the Thames Estuary. She was on a voyage from South Shields, County Durham to London.
Elise Metsler	France	The ship struck rocks in the Gironde. She put back to Pauillac, Gironde in a waterlogged condition.
Emily	United Kingdom	The schooner foundered in the North Sea off Bridlington, Yorkshire. Her crew were rescued by a fishing smack. She was on a voyage from South Shields to Rouen, Seine-Inférieure, France.
Sailor	United Kingdom	The brigantine was driven ashore and severely damaged at Moville, County Donegal.
Telegraph	United Kingdom	The cutter struck sluice gates at Calais, France and sank. She was on a voyage from Colchester, Essex to Calais.
West Ridge	United Kingdom	The ship ran aground on the Maplin Sand, in the North Sea off the coast of Essex. She was on a voyage from Dundee, Forfarshire to London.
Unnamed	United Kingdom	The Mersey Flat collided with the steamship Elmina (United Kingdom) and sank in the River Mersey.

== 12 March ==
List of shipwrecks: 12 March 1875
Ship	State	Description
Bengalese	United Kingdom	The steamship departed from Constantinople, Ottoman Empire for Malta. Presumed subsequently foundered with the loss of all hands. Wreckage thought to be from the ship was discovered off Cape Matapan, Greece.
Cleadon	United Kingdom	The steamship was driven ashore at Coalhouse Point, in the River Thames. She was on a voyage from Sunderland, County Durham to London. She was refloated on 17 March.
Elizabeth	United Kingdom	The brigantine was wrecked on the Barber Sand, in the North Sea off the coast of Norfolk with the loss of all five crew.
Gladstone	United Kingdom	The steamship was driven ashore at Happisburgh, Norfolk. Her 21 crew were rescued by the Yarmouth Lifeboat. She was on a voyage from Middlesbrough, Yorkshire to London.
Isaac Lincoln	United Kingdom	The ship departed from Boston, Massachusetts, United States for Liverpool, Lancashire. No further trace, presumed foundered with the loss of all hands.
Punch	United Kingdom	The schooner was wrecked on the Barber Sand. Her six crew were rescued by the Caister Lifeboat The Boys ( Royal National Lifeboat Institution). Punch was on a voyage from Newcastle upon Tyne, Northumberland to Dublin.

== 13 March ==
List of shipwrecks: 13 March 1875
Ship	State	Description
Bolivia	United Kingdom	The ship ran aground in the Clyde at Greenock, Renfrewshire. She was refloated and taken in to Glasgow, Renfrewshire.
Catharina	Germany	The ship ran aground in the Hudson River. She was on a voyage from New York, United States to Bremen. She was refloated and resumed her voyage.
Freidig	Norway	The barque was driven ashore near "Aslong". She was on a voyage from Torrevieja, Spain to Sandefjord. She was refloated and towed in to Mandal.
Sisters	United Kingdom	The fishing smack collided with the fishing smack Boomerang (United Kingdom) and sank in the North Sea 30 nautical miles (56 km) off Flamborough Head, Yorkshire. Her crew survived.
St. Peter	United Kingdom	The steamship ran aground in the Elbe. She was on a voyage from Hamburg, Germany to Sunderland, County Durham. She was refloated and resumed her voyage.

== 14 March ==
List of shipwrecks: 14 March 1875
Ship	State	Description
Cerdic	United Kingdom	The steamship ran aground in the Gulf of Aden. She was on a voyage from Kurrachee, India to Liverpool, Lancashire. She was refloated and resumed her voyage.
Euphrosyne	New Zealand	The 75-ton schooner sailed from Dunedin for Oamaru. No further trace, presumed foundered with the loss of all six crew.
Immacolata	Italy	The barque was lost near Portopalo di Capo Passero, Sicily. Her crew were rescued. She was on a voyage from Messina, Sicily to Marseille, Bouches-du-Rhône, France.
Lady Maxwell	United Kingdom	The steamship ran aground at Whitehaven, Cumberland.
Robert Halker	United Kingdom	The fishing smack was deliberately set afire in the North Sea by one of her crew.

== 15 March ==
List of shipwrecks: 15 March 1875
Ship	State	Description
City of Richmond	United Kingdom	The ship arrived at Calcutta, India from Liverpool, Lancashire on fire.
Hope	United Kingdom	The ship was wrecked at Bembridge, Isle of Wight.

== 16 March ==
List of shipwrecks: 16 March 1875
Ship	State	Description
Angelo Antonio	Italy	The barque caught fire at Liverpool, Lancashire, United Kingdom of Great Britain and Ireland and was scuttled. She was refloated the next day and found to be severely damaged.
Ringdove	United Kingdom	The steamship ran aground on the Longsand, in the North Sea off the coast of Essex. She was on a voyage from Newcastle upon Tyne, Northumberland to Cartagena, Spain. She was refloated the next day and resumed her voyage.

== 17 March ==
List of shipwrecks: 17 March 1875
Ship	State	Description
Asiatic	United Kingdom	The ship departed from Pensacola, Florida, United States for London. No further trace, presumed foundered with the loss of all hands.
Brittany	United Kingdom	The steamship ran aground at Cardiff, Glamorgan. She was refloated and resumed her voyage.
Calista Haws	United Kingdom	The ship ran aground at New York, United States. She was on a voyage from Pensacola, Florida, United States to Liverpool, Lancashire. She was refloated and resumed her voyage.
Levant	United Kingdom	The barque put in to Stanley, Falkland Islands on fire. She was scuttled on 18 March. She was severely damaged.
Mavourneen	United Kingdom	The barque was wrecked on the Hartwell Reef, off Boa Vista Island Cape Verde Islands. Her crew were rescued. She was on a voyage from Liverpool to the Brass River.
Melodia	United Kingdom	The brigantine was wrecked in the Rio Grande. Her crew were rescued. She was on a voyage from Cádiz, Spain to the Rio Grande.

== 18 March ==
List of shipwrecks: 18 March 1875
Ship	State	Description
Jeanne Louise	France	The fishing trawler was run down and sunk in the English Channel 5 nautical miles (9.3 km) off Beachy Head, Sussex, United Kingdom by the schooner Johanna Mathilda (Sweden) ith the loss of three of her eight crew. Survivors were rescued by Johanna Mathilda.

== 20 March ==
List of shipwrecks: 20 March 1875
Ship	State	Description
Marie	Germany	The barque ran aground at Neufahrwasser. She was refloated and taken in to Danzig.
Théophile Marie	France	The ship foundered in the Atlantic Ocean. Her crew were rescyed by Fylla (Flag unknown). Théophile Marie was on a voyage from "St. Maro" to Havre de Grâce, Seine-Inférieure.

== 21 March ==
List of shipwrecks: 21 March 1875
Ship	State	Description
Bengal	United Kingdom	The steamship ran aground in the Suez Canal. She was on a voyage from Bombay, India to Liverpool, Lancashire. She was refloated on 23 March and resumed her voyage.
Marchioness of Lorne	United Kingdom	The steamship was wrecked on Tiree, Inner Hebrides.

== 22 March ==
List of shipwrecks: 22 March 1875
Ship	State	Description
Anglian	United Kingdom	The steamship was damaged by fire in the Atlantic Ocean. She was on a voyage from Southampton, Hampshire to Cape Town, Cape Colony.

== 23 March ==
List of shipwrecks: 23 March 1875
Ship	State	Description
Kosmopoliet III	Netherlands	The ship ran aground in the Scheldt at Hellevoetsluis, Zeeland.

== 24 March ==
List of shipwrecks: 24 March 1875
Ship	State	Description
Adam Smith	United Kingdom	The brig was run into by the steamship Kron Prinz (Germany) and sank in the North Sea 30 nautical miles (56 km) off Souter Point, Northumberland. Her crew were rescued by Kron Prinz. Adam Smith was on a voyage from London to the River Tyne.
Crighton	United Kingdom	The steamship was driven ashore at Çeşme, Ottoman Empire. She was on a voyage from Alexandria, Egypt to Sulina, Ottoman Empire.
Freia	Norway	The barque was driven ashore on Heligoland. She was on a voyage from Hamburg, Germany to Puerto Rico.
Granite	United Kingdom	The brig ran aground on Scroby Sands, Norfolk. She was on a voyage from London to Sunderland, County Durham. She was refloated with the assistance of a tug.
James Evans	United Kingdom	The fishing smack was destroyed by fire in the Dogger Bank. Her five crew were rescued by the smack Ventura (United Kingdom).
Regina	United Kingdom	The ship ran aground on the Coal Rock. She was on a voyage from "Blackpoint" to Liverpool, Lancashire. She was refloated and taken in to Liverpool in a leaky condition.
Tyne	Norway	The schooner was taken in to Langore, Cornwall, United Kingdom in a derelict condition.

== 25 March ==
List of shipwrecks: 25 March 1875
Ship	State	Description
Albert	United Kingdom	The steamship struck a sunken rock at "Lochchum" and was beached.
Homely	United States	The brig ran aground in an American river. She was on a voyage from Rio de Janeiro, Brazil to the Hampton Roads, Virginia.
Selica	Belgium	The steamship ran aground on the Haaks Bank, in the North Sea off the coast of Zeeland, Netherlands. She was on a voyage from Antwerp to Copenhagen, Denmark. She was refloated and taken in to the Nieuw Diep.
William and Jane	United Kingdom	The ship was towed in to Milford Haven, Pembrokeshire in a sinking condition. She was on a voyage from Saundersfoot, Pembrokeshire to Limerick.

== 26 March ==
List of shipwrecks: 26 March 1875
Ship	State	Description
Apollo	Trieste	The steamship was driven ashore at Silivri, Ottoman Empire. She was on a voyage from Trieste to Constantinople, Ottoman Empire.
Artemisa	Austria-Hungary	The barque was driven ashore at Cape Spartel, Morocco.
Duchess	United Kingdom	The steamship ran aground at Portrush, County Antrim. She was on a voyage from Glasgow, Renfrewshire to Portrush. She was refloated and taken in to Portrush. She grounded on an anchor and was subsequently found to be severely leaky.
Henrietta	United States	The ship was driven ashore on Heligoland. She was on a voyage from Baltimore, Maryland to Hamburg, Germany. She was refloated and taken in to the Elbe.

== 27 March ==
List of shipwrecks: 27 March 1875
Ship	State	Description
Ayrsome	United Kingdom	The ship was damaged by an onboard explosion off Start Point, Devon. Two of her crew were severely injured. She was on a voyage from Cardiff, Glamorgan to Rouen, Seine-Inférieure, France.
Ernestine	Netherlands	The ship ran aground on the Haisborough Sands, in the North Sea off the coast of Norfolk, United Kingdom. She was on a voyage from Sunderland, County Durham, United Kingdom to Makassar, Netherlands East Indies. She was refloated with the assistance of tugs and taken in to Great Yarmouth, Norfolk in a leaky condition.
Essex	United Kingdom	The steamship ran aground at Bornholm, Denmark. Her crew were rescued. She was on a voyage from Hull, Yorkshire to Pillau, Germany. She was refloated on 30 March.
Formosa	Canada	The barque ran aground at "Beale", County Kerry, United Kingdom. She was on a voyage from Philadelphia, Pennsylvania, United States to Limerick. She was refloated.
Frances	United Kingdom	The barque ran aground off the Hurst Castle, Hampshire. She was refloated and resumed her voyage.
Gills	United Kingdom	The ketch was driven ashore at Blakeney, Norfolk. She was on a voyage from London to Gainsborough, Lincolnshire.
Hampton	Netherlands	The ship ran aground off Goeree, Zeeland. She was on a voyage from Batavia, Netherlands East Indies to a Dutch port.
Hawke	United Kingdom	The ship ran aground at Boscastle, Cornwall and was severely damaged.
Kordula	Norway	The barque ran aground in the Palmones. She was on a voyage from Cowes, Isle of Wight, United Kingdom to Barcelona, Spain. She was later refloated and taken in to Gibraltar for repairs.
Ortensia	United Kingdom	The ship was driven ashore south of Cape Spartel, Morocco and was abandoned by her crew.

== 28 March ==
List of shipwrecks: 28 March 1875
Ship	State	Description
Louisa	United Kingdom	The ketch was driven ashore and sank at Flamborough Head, Yorkshire with the loss of all four people on board.
Martin Scott	United Kingdom	The ship ran aground in the River Thames. sHe was on a voyage from London to Calcutta, India.
Thirteen	United Kingdom	The brig was wrecked on the Cross Sand, in the North Sea off the coast of Norfolk. Her eight crew were rescued by the Caister Lifeboat The Boys ( Royal National Lifeboat Institution).

== 29 March ==
List of shipwrecks: 29 March 1875
Ship	State	Description
Joneheid	Denmark	The ship was driven ashore at Morup, Sweden. She was on a voyage from Belfast, County Antrim, United Kingdom to Copenhagen. She was refloated and resumed her voyage.
Storm Finch	United Kingdom	The yacht struck a submerged object and was wrecked at Algiers, Algeria with the loss of two of the six people on board. She was refloated on 19 May and taken in to Algiers.
Yuen Tze Fee	China	The ship was driven ashore on "Dodd Island". All on board were rescued. She was a total loss.

== 31 March ==
List of shipwrecks: 31 March 1875
Ship	State	Description
Anna	United Kingdom	The ship ran aground at Pensacola, Florida, United States. She was on a voyage from Barrow-in-Furness, Lancashire to Pensacola.
Corsica	United States	The barque collided with the full-rigged ship Ida Lily (United States at Astoria, New York. Corsica was severely damaged and was beached. She was on a voyage from Portland, Oregon to a European port.
Galathea	United Kingdom	The barque was driven ashore in Wendelsfjord. She was on a voyage from Blyth, Northumberland to Copenhagen, Denmark. She was refloated on 5 April and towed in to Copenhagen by a steamship.
Helmi	Germany	The brig ran aground at Lagos, Lagos Colony and was severely damaged. She was refloated.

== Unknown date ==
List of shipwrecks: Unknown date in March 1875
Ship	State	Description
Agatha	United Kingdom	The schooner was abandoned in the North Sea off Flamborough Head, East Riding of Yorkshire. She was towed in to Grimsby, Lincolnshire on 10 March by the smack United Friends (United Kingdom).
Anna	Norway	The barque was wrecked at Pensacola, Florida, United States. She was on a voyage from Barrow-in-Furness, Lancashire, United Kingdom to Pensacola.
Annabel	United States	The schooner was abandoned in the Atlantic Ocean before 9 March.
Ardent	France	The ship was wrecked off Mayaguana, Bahamas. She was on a voyage from Sainte-Marie, Martinique to a French port.
Cairnduna	United Kingdom	The schooner was driven ashore at Bamburgh Castle, Northumberland. Her four crew were rescued by the North Sunderland Lifeboat. She was on a voyage from Dundee, Forfarshire to Sunderland, County Durham.
Castor	Austria-Hungary	The ship was wrecked in the Chandeleur Islands, Louisiana, United States before 23 March. She was on a voyage from Cienfuegos, Cuba to Pascagoula, Mississippi, United States.
Celt	United Kingdom	The steamship was wrecked at Quoin Point, Cape Colony. All on board were rescued.
City of London	United Kingdom	The ship was driven ashore at Tacumshane, County Wexford. She broke up on 7 March.
Evelyn	United Kingdom	The barque foundered in the Atlantic Ocean before 5 March. She was on a voyage from Baltimore, Maryland, United States to Queenstown, County Cork.
Fleetwing	United Kingdom	The ship ran aground at "Puenta", Mallorca, Spain. She was on a voyage from Agrigento, Sicily, Italy to Runcorn, Cheshire. She was refloated.
Geraldine	United Kingdom	The ship became a total loss in the Congo River due to piracy. Her crew were rescued.
Gipsy Lass	United Kingdom	The Yorkshire Billyboy foundered in the North Sea off the coast of Lincolnshire with the loss of all hands.
H. B. Stanwood	United States	The Schooner was lost in March. Lost with all 12 hands.
Homely	United States	The brig ran aground in the River Plate. She was on a voyage from Rio de Janeiro, Brazil to the Hampton Roads, Virginia.
Invincible	France	The ship ran aground off Sagua la Grande, Cuba.
Louisa	United Kingdom	The ship was wrecked on the Scorpion Reef, in the Gulf of Mexico before 11 March. She was on a voyage from the Laguna de Términos to Falmouth, Cornwall.
Manila	United Kingdom	The ship was abandoned off the coast of New South Wales before 20 March.
Margaret Ridley	United Kingdom	The ship was wrecked at Cape Pine, Newfoundland Colony before 5 March.
Mary	United States	While backing out of slip between two piers into the East River in New York City near Corlears Hook in fog in mid-March, the tug collided with the steamboat Shady Side (United States) and sank.
May Queen	United Kingdom	The ship was destroyed by fire off Madras, India. She was on a voyage from Newcastle upon Tyne, Northumberland to Galle, Ceylon and Rangoon, Burma.
Mendes Leal	Portugal	The brig was abandoned in the South Atlantic. Her crew were rescued by the steamship Ville Rio de Janeiro (France). Mendes Leal was on a voyage from Bahia, Brazil to Lisbon.
Mercur	France	The ship was driven ashore at Queenstown. She was refloated on 1 April.
Minerva	Portugal	The barque ran aground at the mouth of the Rio Grande. She was on a voyage from Porto to the Rio Grande. She was refloated and taken in to the Rio Grande in a waterlogged condition.
Miranda	New South Wales	The barque was wrecked at the mouth of the Brunswick River.
Nil Desperandum	United Kingdom	The fishing yawl was abandoned in the North Sea in late March. She was discovered 25 nautical miles (46 km) off Coquet Island, Northumberland on 2 April by Pert (United Kingdom).
R. S. Hassell	United Kingdom	The ship was wrecked on the Colorado Reef, off the cost of Cuba. She was on a voyage from Cienfuegos, Cuba to Belfast, County Antrim.
Tein Esser	Germany	The schooner was abandoned in the Indian Ocean. Her crew were rescued. She was on a voyage from Adelaide, South Australia to the Natal Colony.
Violette	France	The barque foundered at sea before 5 March. Her crew survived.
William C. Endicott	United States	The Schooner was lost in March. Lost with all 12 hands.
Zedora	South Australia	The ship was wrecked at Fremantle, Western Australia before 8 March. Her crew were rescued. She was on a voyage from Mauritius to Adelaide.
