= Boyton, Cornwall =

Village in Cornwall, England

Coordinates: 50.703°N 4.381°W

Boyton: Cornish: Trevoya
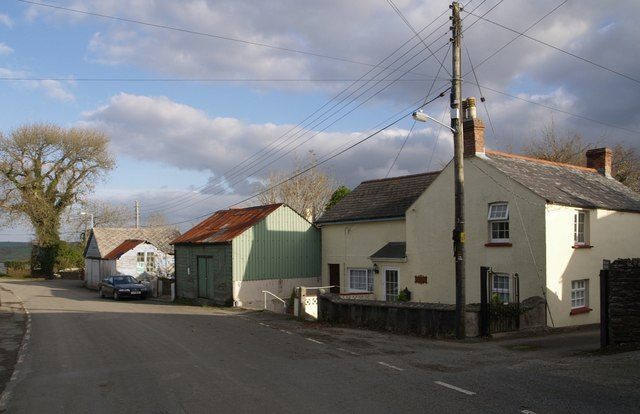
- Boyton

- Location within Cornwall
- Population: 457 (United Kingdom Census 2011)
- OS grid reference: SX319919
- Civil parish: Boyton
- Unitary authority: Cornwall
- Ceremonial county: Cornwall
- Region: South West
- Country: England
- Sovereign state: United Kingdom
- Post town: LAUNCESTON
- Postcode district: PL15
- Dialling code: 01566
- Police: Devon and Cornwall
- Fire: Cornwall
- Ambulance: South Western
- UK Parliament: North Cornwall

Boyton (Cornish: Trevoya) is a civil parish and village in Cornwall, England, United Kingdom. It is situated close to the River Tamar and the border with Devon about six miles (10 km) north of Launceston. According to the 2001 census it had a population of 378.This increased to 457 at the 2011 census.

Boyton is a rural parish which takes its name from Boia's Farm and is mentioned in the Domesday Book as Boitone. It is bounded to the east by the Devon border, to the north by North Tamerton parishes, to the west by North Petherwin parish, and to the south by Werrington parish. Boyton is in the Launceston Registration District.

The manor of Boyton was recorded in the Domesday Book (1086) when it was one of several manors held by Hamelin from Robert, Count of Mortain. There was half a hide of land and land for 4 ploughs. There were 2 ploughs, 3 serfs, 2 villeins, 3 smallholders, 5 acres of woodland, 60 acres of pasture, 6 cattle and 30 sheep. The value of the manor was 15 shillings though it had formerly been worth £1 sterling.

At Boyton Mill the miller's house is built of stone and wooden beams. The mill building itself has many original features, the waterwheel and machinery still turn and can be seen working. Some parts of the mill building dates back to the 13th century, and the main house dates back over 500 years.

The hamlets of Bennacott, Curry Lane, North Beer and West Curry are in the parish.

== Parish church ==
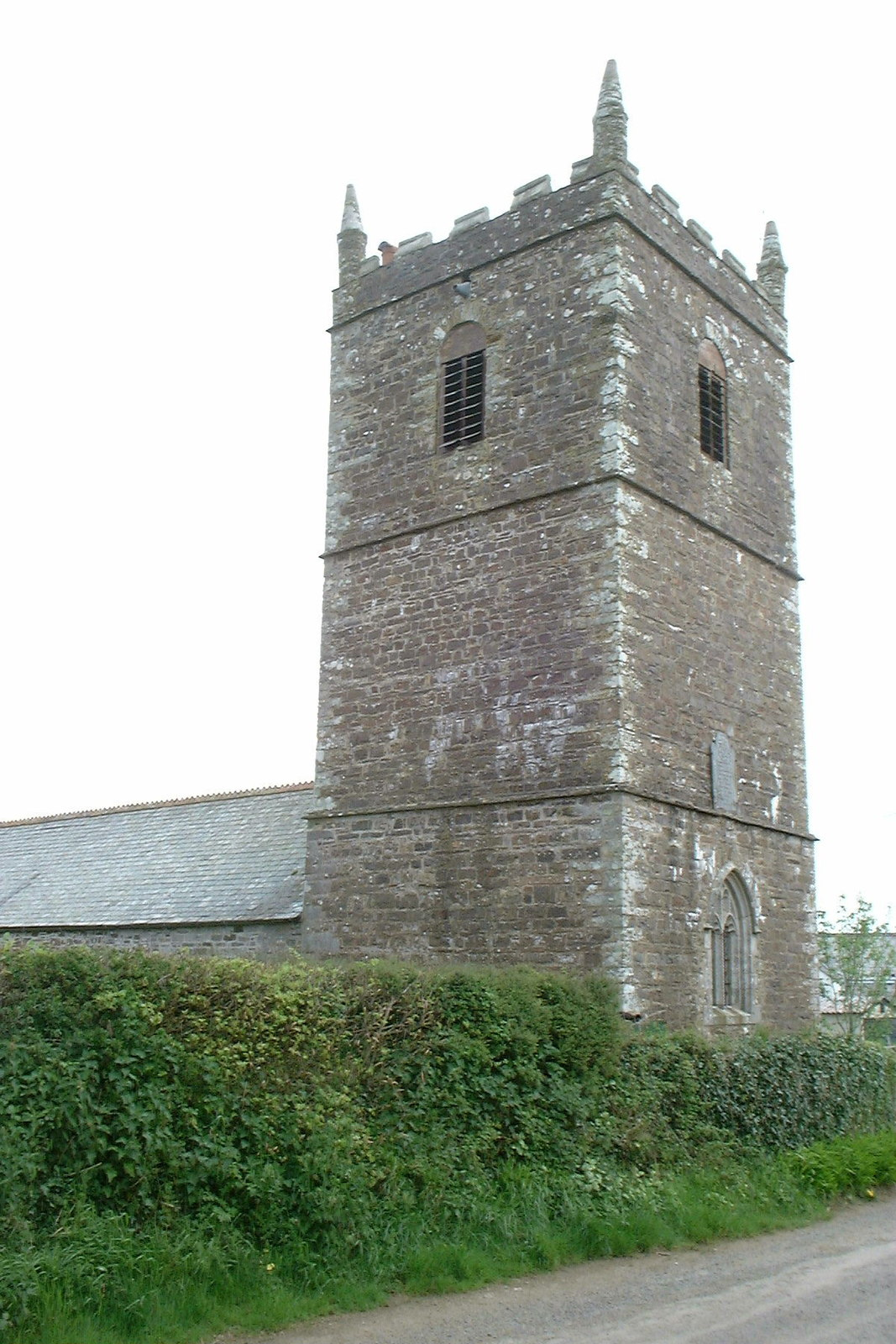
The Church of the Holy Name

Boyton parish church stands on the site of an earlier Norman church and was dedicated to the Holy Name in the 14th century. It consists of a chancel, nave, south aisle and tower only. The tower is of the 14th century and the south aisle of the 15th century. Part of the tower was rebuilt in 1692–94. The base of the rood screen remains as do the old wagon roofs, that in the aisle being a good example of its kind. The font is plain and early Norman and an irregular oval in shape.

== Notable people ==
Tim Smith [b.1947], MP for Ashfield (Derbyshire) 1977-1982 and Beaconsfield 1982–1997. Lives at Boyton.
