= Billacott =

Hamlet in Cornwall, England

Coordinates: 50.6905°N 4.4653°W

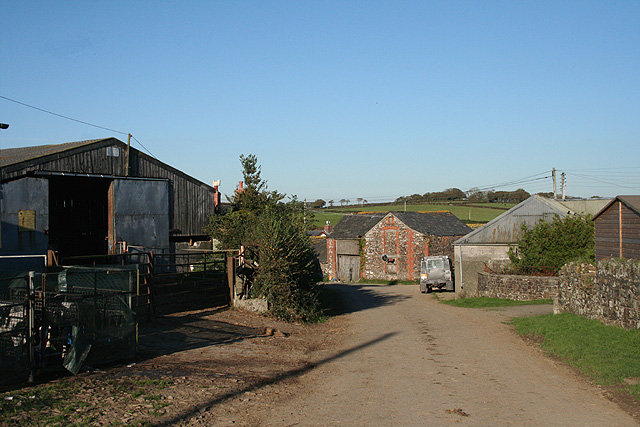

- Location within Cornwall
- OS grid reference: SX260908
- Civil parish: North Petherwin
- Unitary authority: Cornwall
- Ceremonial county: Cornwall
- Region: South West
- Country: England
- Sovereign state: United Kingdom
- Post town: LAUNCESTON
- Postcode district: PL15
- Dialling code: 01566
- Police: Devon and Cornwall
- Fire: Cornwall
- Ambulance: South Western
- UK Parliament: North Cornwall

Billacott is a hamlet in east Cornwall, England, United Kingdom. It is situated in the civil parish of North Petherwin (where the 2011 Census population was listed) and is six miles north-west of Launceston.
