= Northcott, Torridge =

Human settlement in Devon, England

Coordinates: 50.71°N 4.35°W

Northcott
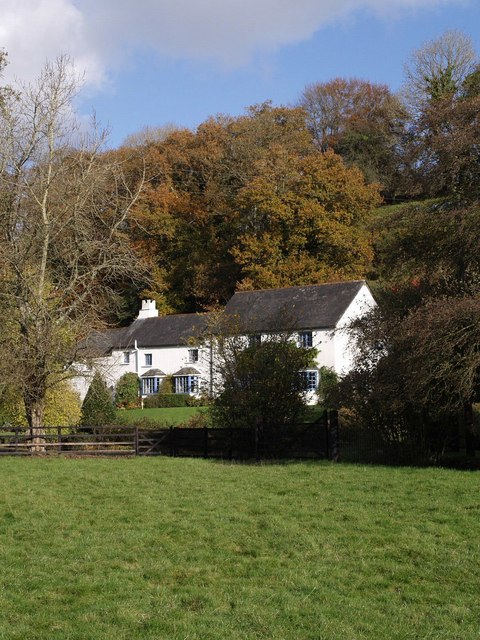
- Boyton Mill, in the south of the parish

- Location within Devon
- Population: 26 (2001 census)
- Civil parish: Northcott
- District: Torridge
- Shire county: Devon
- Region: South West
- Country: England
- Sovereign state: United Kingdom

Northcott is a small settlement and civil parish in the far west of Devon, England. It lies about seven miles south of the town of Holsworthy and forms part of the local government district of Torridge. It is bordered on the north by the parish of Luffincott and on the east and south by the parish of St Giles on the Heath. Its western border follows the River Tamar which forms the county boundary with Cornwall. In 2001 its population was 26, down from 60 in 1901. Whilst it is administered as a separate parish in Devon, for ecclesiastical purposes it is linked with the parish of Boyton across the River Tamar in Cornwall, and it has been transferred from one county to the other several times.

Boyton Mill is a stone building near the river that dates from the early 12th century and retains its machinery and an overshot waterwheel. In Northcott Wood, south of the mill, is a likely Iron Age defended enclosure that overlooks the river.
