= Trebeath =

Hamlet in Cornwall, England

Coordinates: 50°39′40″N 4°27′38″W

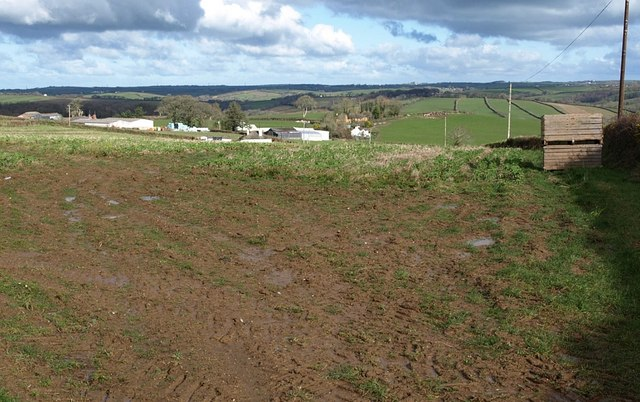
Trebeath

Trebeath is a hamlet in the parish of Egloskerry, Cornwall, England, United Kingdom.
