= West Curry =

Farm in Cornwall, England

Coordinates: 50.7173°N 4.4313°W

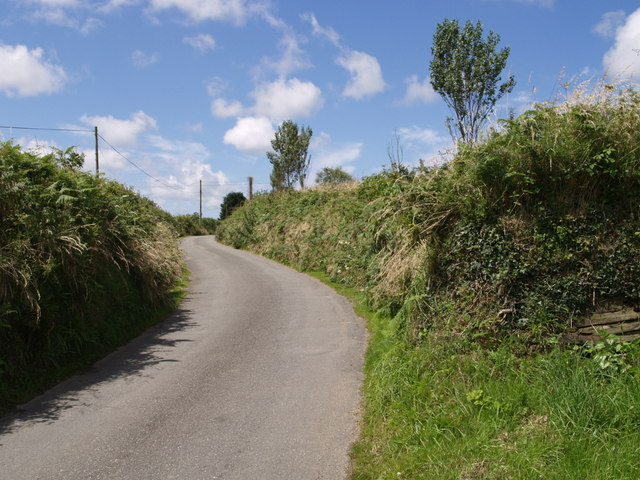
Lane to West Curry

West Curry is a farm north of Bennacott in north Cornwall, England, UK.

It appears in the Domesday Book (1086) as Chori, where in 1086 Iovin the Craftsman held it from Robert, Count of Mortain.
