= Eggbeare =

Hamlet in Cornwall, England

Coordinates: 50.675°N 4.359°W

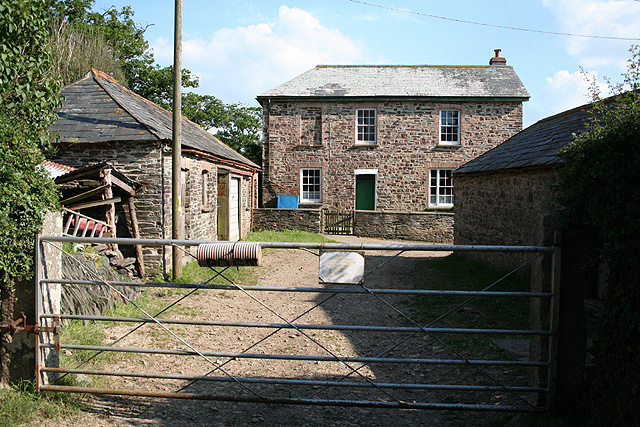
- A farmhouse at Eggbeare

- Location within Cornwall
- OS grid reference: SX334888
- Civil parish: Werrington
- Unitary authority: Cornwall
- Ceremonial county: Cornwall
- Region: South West
- Country: England
- Sovereign state: United Kingdom
- Post town: LAUNCESTON
- Postcode district: PL15
- Dialling code: 01566
- Police: Devon and Cornwall
- Fire: Cornwall
- Ambulance: South Western
- UK Parliament: North Cornwall

Eggbeare is a hamlet 2 miles (3.2 km) north-east of Launceston in east Cornwall, England. Eggbeare lies at around 94 metres (308 ft) above sea level and is in the civil parish of Werrington.
