= The Curdridge Country Show =

Coordinates: 50.920107°N 1.248762°W

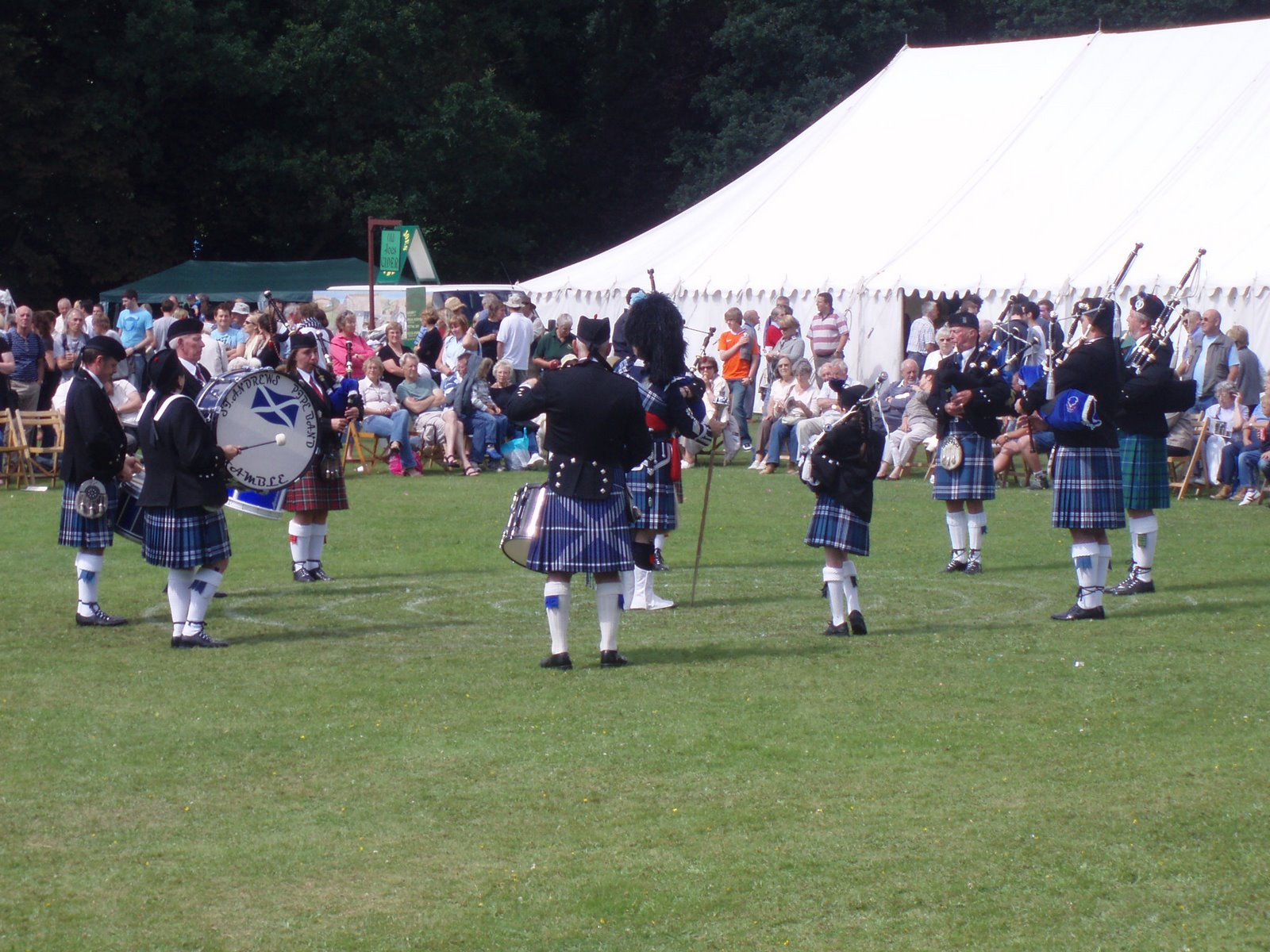
A random image of one of the exhibitions taken from the 2008 Curdridge Country Show

The Curdridge Country Show is an annual country fair in Curdridge, Hampshire, England. The event is held mid-July on a Saturday, and attracts up to 7000 attendees each year. 2025 is Curdriges 69th year

The show includes a dog show, falconry display, and a vintage car parade There is a horticultural competition with numerous categories. Vendor booths sell crafts and other items with demonstrations.

The show also has sideshows, such as a coconut shy, plate smashing and tombolas. A barbecue, hog roast and bar provide refreshments.t. A traditional barn dance is held on the last Saturday.
