= Badharlick =

Hamlet in Cornwall, England

Coordinates: 50.6532°N 4.4429°W

Badharlick: Cornish: Bos Harlek
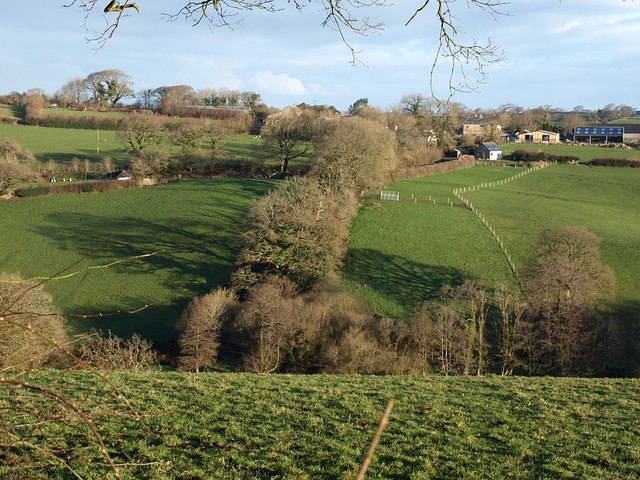

- Location within Cornwall
- OS grid reference: SX273866
- Unitary authority: Cornwall
- Ceremonial county: Cornwall
- Region: South West
- Country: England
- Sovereign state: United Kingdom
- Post town: Launceston
- Postcode district: PL15 8xx
- Police: Devon and Cornwall
- Fire: Cornwall
- Ambulance: South Western
- UK Parliament: North Cornwall

Badharlick (Cornish: Bos Harlek, meaning Harlek's dwelling) is a hamlet in the parish of Egloskerry, Cornwall, UK, situated halfway between the villages of Tregeare and Egloskerry.
