= Cutmere =

Hamlet in Cornwall, England

Coordinates: 50.421°N 4.352°W

- Location within Cornwall
- OS grid reference: SX330605
- Civil parish: St Germans
- Unitary authority: Cornwall
- Ceremonial county: Cornwall
- Region: South West
- Country: England
- Sovereign state: United Kingdom
- Post town: Saltash
- Postcode district: PL12

Cutmere is a hamlet in the parish of St Germans, Cornwall, England. It is in the civil parish of Quethiock
