= Cusveorth Coombe =

Hamlet in Cornwall, England

Coordinates: 50.245°N 5.138°W

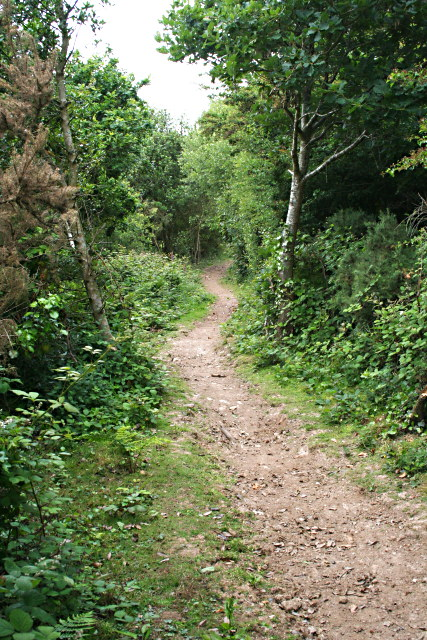
- Bridleway through Cusveorth Coombe

- Location within Cornwall
- OS grid reference: SW764431
- Civil parish: Kea
- Unitary authority: Cornwall
- Ceremonial county: Cornwall
- Region: South West
- Country: England
- Sovereign state: United Kingdom
- Post town: Truro
- Postcode district: TR4

Cusveorth Coombe is a hamlet in the parish of Kea, Cornwall, England.
