= Curry Lane =

Hamlet in Cornwall, England

Coordinates: 50.714°N 4.424°W

- Location within Cornwall
- OS grid reference: SX290933
- Civil parish: Boyton
- Unitary authority: Cornwall
- Ceremonial county: Cornwall
- Region: South West
- Country: England
- Sovereign state: United Kingdom
- Post town: Launceston
- Postcode district: PL15

Curry Lane is a hamlet in the parish of Boyton Cornwall, England.
