= South Wheatley, Cornwall =

Hamlet in Cornwall, UK

Coordinates: 50°42′41″N 4°29′12″W

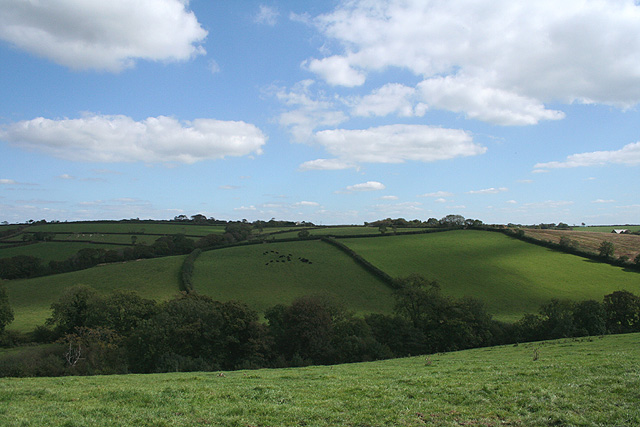
Landscape near South Wheatley

South Wheatley is a hamlet between Canworthy Water and Maxworthy in Cornwall, England, United Kingdom.
