= Werrington, Cornwall =

Village and civil parish in Cornwall, England

Coordinates: 50.665°N 4.366°W

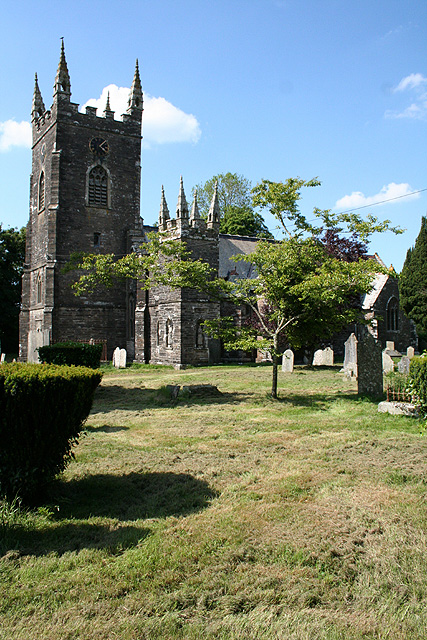
St Martin's Church, Werrington

Werrington (Cornish: Trewolvredow) is a civil parish and former manor now in Cornwall, United Kingdom. Prior to boundary changes it straddled the Tamar and lay within the county of Devon. The portion on the west side was transferred to Cornwall by the abolition of Broadwoodwidger Rural District by the Local Government Commission for England in 1966. It is situated 1 mile (1.6 km) to the west of the Tamar, the traditional boundary between Devon and Cornwall, and 1 mile (1.6 km) north of Launceston.

== Geography ==
White's Devonshire Directory (1850) described the parish of Werrington as being near the River Tamar and the Bude Canal and having an area of c. 5,000 acres. Yeolmbridge, Druxton and Eggbeer were then within the parish which was included in Black Torrington Hundred. Druxton Bridge is a Grade II* listed 16th century road bridge.

== Manor ==
The descent of the manor of Werrington was as follows:

=== Crown ===
Before the Norman Conquest of 1066, the manor of Werrington, in the hundred of Black Torrington, was the sole possession of Gytha of Wessex (died 1098 or 1107), the daughter of King Harold (d.1066). In the Domesday Book of 1086 it is recorded as Ulvredintone. Containing 186 households it was far and away the largest settlement in the far west.

=== Tavistock Abbey ===
In about 1066-8 she gave it to Tavistock Abbey, which held it until the Dissolution of the Monasteries. According to Risdon (d.1640) Werrington continued to be the "principal manor" of the honour of the Abbots of Tavistock until Dissolution.

=== Russell ===
At the Dissolution of the Monasteries Werrington was granted by King Henry VIII in 1540, together with most of the other vast possessions of Tavistock Abbey, to John Russell, 1st Baron Russell (1485–1555)(later 1st Earl of Bedford). In 1810 the manor of Werrington was said to include three parishes: Werrington, St Giles-in-the-Heath and North Petherwin, and was still owned by the Russell family, namely by John Russell, 6th Duke of Bedford (1766–1839), whose steward held courts for the manor. However, it appears that while the manor was retained by the Russells, the estate of Werrington within the manor was sold to Edward Woodward and Henry and Bartholomew Lucas. The "steward of the court of the Earl of Bedford" at Werrington in about 1600 was John Twiggs, whose family pedigree is included in the 1620 Heraldic Visitation of Devon. John Twiggs's grandson was Richard Twiggs "of Werrington", whose son was Benjamin Twiggs (1616-c.1678/9) "of Werrington", who both described themselves as "of Werrington" in their wills.

=== Drake ===
The estate of Werrington was acquired in 1620 by Sir Francis Drake, 1st Baronet (1588–1637), of Buckland Monachorum in Devon, nephew of the famous Admiral Sir Francis Drake (d.1596). In 1631 he obtained a royal licence to empark lands in Werrington and St. Stephen by Launceston and later rebuilt the manor house. In 1649 Sir Francis Drake, 2nd Baronet (1617–1662) purchased the nearby manor of Launceston and the borough of Newport in the parish of St. Stephen, and moved his main residence to Buckland Monachorum, whereupon he sold Werrington to Sir William Morice.

=== Morice ===
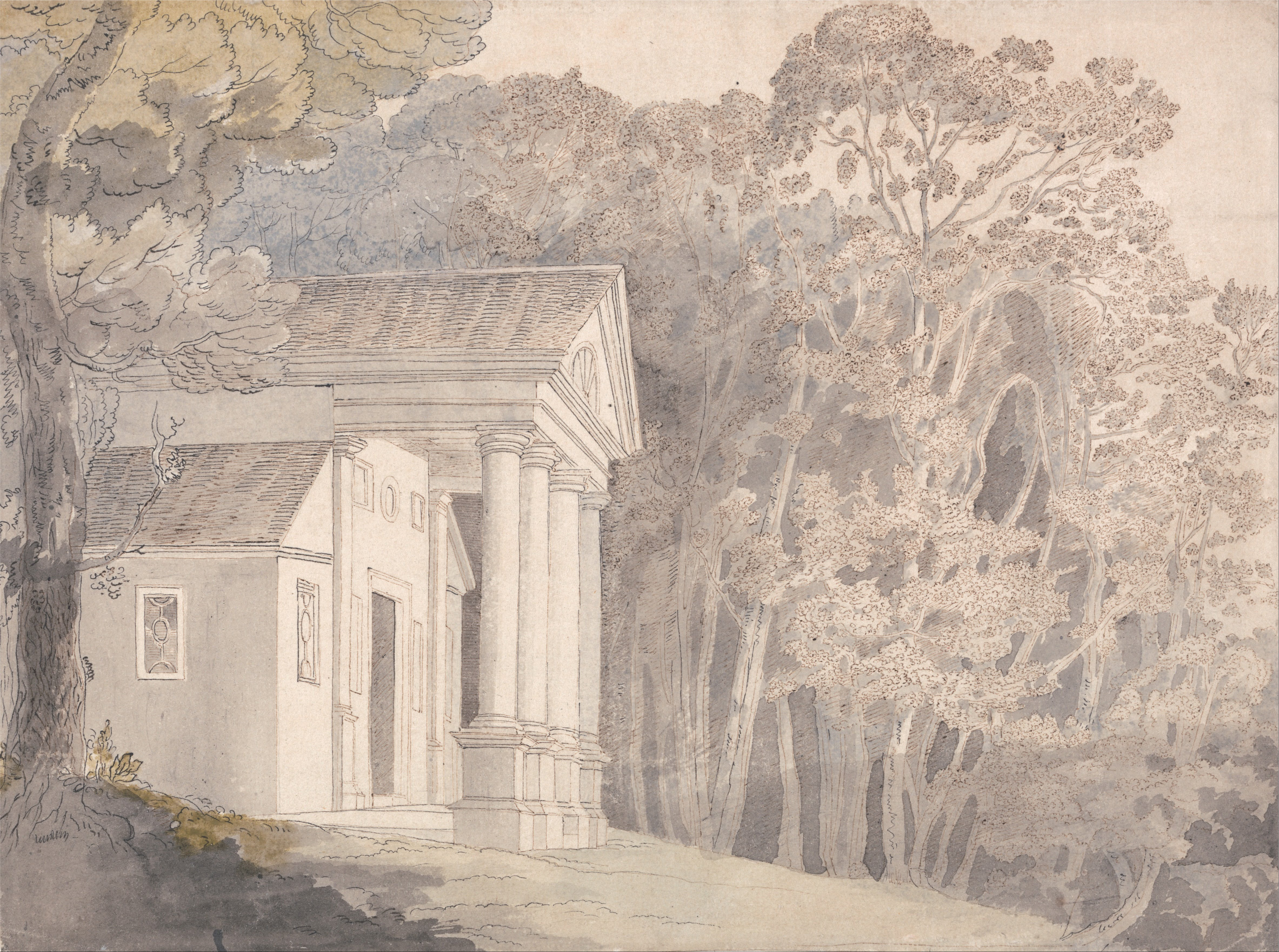
Werrington Park, Devonshire, undated watercolour by Francis Towne (1739–1816), Yale Center for British Art, New Haven, USA

The estate was sold in 1651 to Sir William Morice (1602–1676), Secretary of State to King Charles II, who also purchased from the Drake family the manor of Launceston. The present mansion, today known as Werrington Park was built by one of his descendants in the 1730s, possibly to the design of William Kent, which involved the demolition and re-siting of the parish church of St Martin.

=== Percy ===
The manor with 11,000 acres was purchased in 1775 by Hugh Percy, 1st Duke of Northumberland (1714–1786), who further embellished the interior. He also purchased all the outlying tenements in Newport and much property in the borough of Launceston.

=== Various 1864–1882 ===
Between 1864 and 1882 Werrington passed through a succession of brief ownerships. In 1864 Werrington was purchased by Alexander Hey Campbell, a Manchester merchant, MP for Launceston from 1865 to 1868. In 1868 he sold it to William Wentworth Fitzwilliam Dick, of County Wicklow, Ireland, who sold it in 1871 to Col. James Henry Deakin I (1823–1880), a Manchester merchant, briefly Member of Parliament for Launceston, who was succeeded in that seat by his son James Henry Deakin II (1851–1881). During this period much of the peripheral lands and properties of the estate were sold off.

=== Williams ===
The estate was acquired in 1882 by John Charles Williams (1861–1939) of Caerhays Castle, who renovated the house, including a re-modelling of the East Range.

== Church of St Martin ==
The churches of Werrington and St Giles, both in Devon, had the status of chapelries in the Middle Ages; the impropriators of the churches of North Petherwin (Tavistock Abbey) and St Stephen's by Launceston (Launceston Priory). A settlement of the dispute was made in 1500 in favour of the priory which undertook the cost of a resident chaplain to serve both Werrington and St Giles.

The original site of the parish church of St Martin was in Werrington Park but it was re-built in 1742 on a new site in the Gothic style; the tower is from the old church. The front in the earliest Gothic Revival style suggests that the architect could have been William Kent. There are two fonts: one is plain and Norman and the other contemporary with the rebuilding. There is a peal of eight bells.

== Sources ==
- Cornwall Record Office, Werrington Estate Records, covering dates 1433 – 1909, ref: WW, Introduction

== See also ==
- Broadwoodwidger Rural District
- Local Government Commission For England (1958-1967)
