= Church of All Saints, Winkleigh =

Coordinates: 50°51′21″N 3°56′38″W

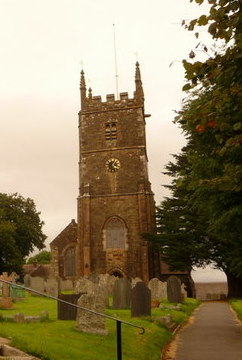
- Church of All Saints, Winkleigh
- OS grid reference: SS 63274 08062
- Location: Winkleigh, Devon
- Country: England
- Denomination: Church of England
- Previous denomination: Roman Catholic Church

History
- Status: Active

Architecture
- Functional status: Parish church
- Heritage designation: Grade I listed
- Designated: 4 October 1960

Administration
- Diocese: Diocese of Exeter
- Archdeaconry: Archdeaconry of Barnstaple
- Parish: Winkleigh

The Church of All Saints is a parish church of the Church of England in Winkleigh, Devon. The church is a Grade I listed building. The parish of Winkleigh is part of the Winkleigh Mission.

== History ==
The earliest part of the church dates to the early 14th century. The church was remodelled in the 15th century. Additions were made in the 17th and 19th centuries. From 1871 to 1873, a major restoration was undertaken by J. F. Gould; it cost between £6000 and £7000, all of which (save £150 collected in the parish) was donated by George Henry Pinckard. In 1902, the chancel was restored by George Fellowes Prynne, and an oak rood screen was inserted.

On 4 October 1960, the church was designated a grade I listed building.
