= Luffincott =

Village in Devon, UK

Coordinates: 50°43′N 4°22′W

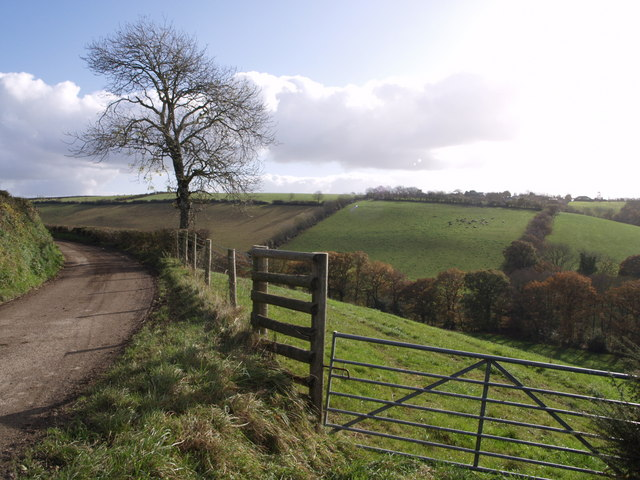
- The lane to West Peeke Farm

- Location within Devon
- Population: 45 (2001 census)
- Civil parish: Luffincott
- District: Torridge
- Shire county: Devon
- Region: South West
- Country: England
- Sovereign state: United Kingdom

Luffincott is a civil parish in the far west of Devon, England. It forms part of the local government district of Torridge and lies about six miles south of the town of Holsworthy. The parish is surrounded clockwise from the north by the parishes of Tetcott, Ashwater, St Giles on the Heath and Northcott. Its western border follows the River Tamar which forms the county boundary with Cornwall.

The A388 road between Holsworthy and Launceston runs just inside the eastern border of the parish. In 2001 its population was 45, down from 62 in 1901 and for ecclesiastical purposes, it is united with Tetcott.

The name Luffincott has a variety of early forms, first appearing in documents as Leghygnecoth′ in 1242 with variants such as Loghingecote (1285), Lughyngcote (1330), Loghynton que vocatur Loghyngecote (1346) and Luffencote (1577). Its derivation is cot (cottage or small settlement) of Luhha′s people.

The manor is believed to have been the origin of the "Lippingcott" Devonshire gentry family (which later moved to Wibbery (mod: Webbery) in the parish of Alverdiscott), whose surname is a corruption of the name of this manor.

St James's Church, Luffincott is a Grade I listed building, declared redundant in 1975. It stands near to the farmyard of Luffincott Barton, a mid-19th-century farmhouse and out-buildings which were part of the Tetcott estate. According to Pevsner, Luffincott Barton is the only other building of interest in the parish.
