= North Beer =

Hamlet in Cornwall, England

Coordinates: 50.702°N 4.40°W

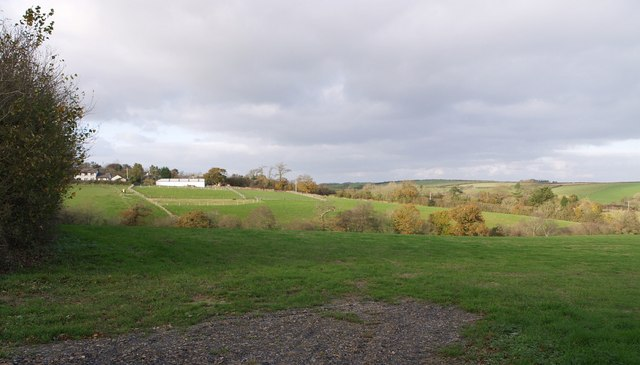
- North Beer from South Beer

- Location within Cornwall
- OS grid reference: SX307919
- Civil parish: Boyton
- Unitary authority: Cornwall
- Ceremonial county: Cornwall
- Region: South West
- Country: England
- Sovereign state: United Kingdom

North Beer is a hamlet in the parish of Boyton in north Cornwall, England. North Beer is west of Boyton.
