= Cudlipptown =

Village in Devon, England

Coordinates: 50.5922°N 4.0918°W

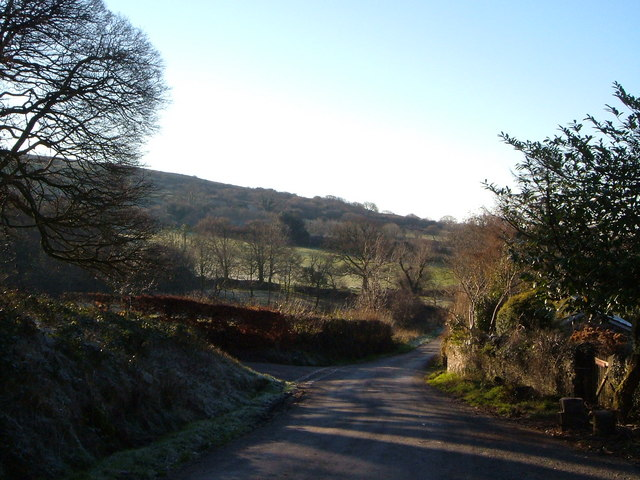
- A lane in Cudlipptown

- Location within Devon
- OS grid reference: SX525785
- District: West Devon
- Shire county: Devon
- Region: South West
- Country: England
- Sovereign state: United Kingdom
- Post town: TAVISTOCK
- Postcode district: PL19
- Dialling code: 01822
- Police: Devon and Cornwall
- Fire: Devon and Somerset
- Ambulance: South Western
- UK Parliament: Torridge and West Devon

Cudlipptown or Cudliptown is a small village located near the western edge of Dartmoor National Park, northeast of Tavistock, and approximately one mile northeast of Peter Tavy.

The village comprises a few houses, with a post box embedded in the front garden wall of one of the houses. A 15th-century inn, the Peter Tavy Inn, is found in the village of Peter Tavy nearby.
