= Ladycross =

Coordinates: 50°40′15″N 4°22′45″W

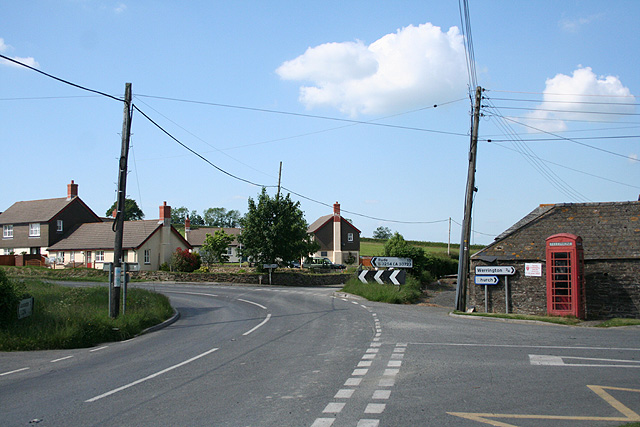
- Ladycross

- Location within Cornwall
- Shire county: Cornwall
- Region: South West
- Country: England
- Sovereign state: United Kingdom
- Police: Devon and Cornwall
- Fire: Cornwall
- Ambulance: South Western

Ladycross is a hamlet near Werrington (where the population of the 2011 census was included.) in Cornwall, England. It is on the B3254 road half a mile north of Yeolmbridge.
