= Dutson =

Hamlet in Cornwall, England

Coordinates: 50.649°N 4.349°W

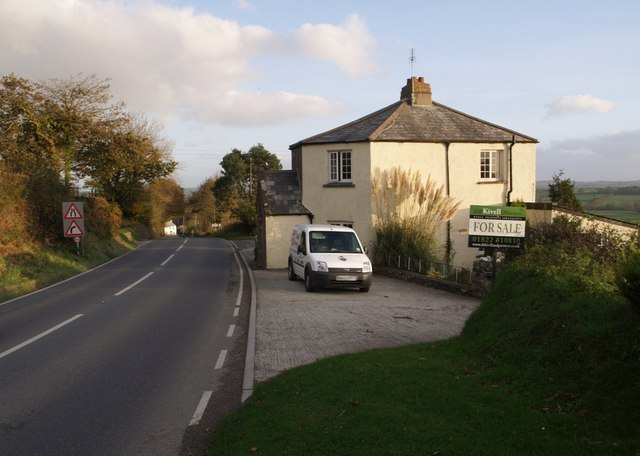
A former toll house on the A388 road

Dutson is a hamlet northeast of Launceston in Cornwall, England, and on the A388 main road. It is in the civil parish of St Stephens by Launceston Rural
