= Brazacott =

Hamlet in Cornwall, England

Coordinates: 50.693°N 04.456°W

Brazacott: Cornish: Bosvrosyow
- Location within Cornwall
- OS grid reference: SX2691
- Shire county: Cornwall
- Region: South West
- Country: England
- Sovereign state: United Kingdom
- Post town: Launceston
- Postcode district: PL15
- Dialling code: 01566
- Police: Devon and Cornwall
- Fire: Cornwall
- Ambulance: South Western

Brazzacott or Brazacott (Cornish: Bosvrosyow, meaning Dwelling of the Followers of Bros) is a hamlet in east Cornwall, England, United Kingdom. It is situated in the civil parish of North Petherwin and is six miles north-west of Launceston .
