= Cutmadoc =

Hamlet in Cornwall, England

Coordinates: 50.443°N 4.683°W

Cutmadoc: Cornish: Kosmasek
- Location within Cornwall
- OS grid reference: SX096638
- Civil parish: Lanhydrock
- Unitary authority: Cornwall
- Ceremonial county: Cornwall
- Region: South West
- Country: England
- Sovereign state: United Kingdom
- Post town: Bodmin
- Postcode district: PL30 4

Cutmadoc (Cornish: Kosmasek, meaning Maddoc's wood or Masek's wood) is a hamlet in the parish of Lanhydrock (where the 2011 census population was included ), Cornwall, England.
