= St James's Church, Luffincott =

Church in Devon, England

St James's Church
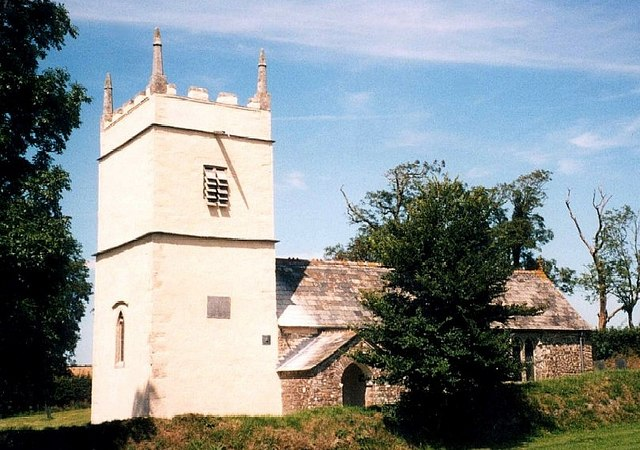

- Location within Devon
- 50°43′39″N 4°21′50″W
- Location: Luffincott, Devon, England

History
- Built: 15th century

Listed Building – Grade I
- Official name: Church of St James
- Designated: 14 February 1958
- Reference no.: 1161919

St James's Church in Luffincott, Devon, England was built in the 15th century. It is recorded in the National Heritage List for England as a designated Grade I listed building, and is now a redundant church in the care of the Churches Conservation Trust. It was declared redundant on 1 May 1975, and was vested in the Trust on 19 December 1979.

Some parts of the church are the original mediaeval structure however the tower was rebuilt in 1791 as part of a wider renovation.

The interior includes Georgian sash windows and a simple 14th century granite font.

== See also ==
- List of churches preserved by the Churches Conservation Trust in South West England
