= Curgurrell =

Coordinates: 50.198°N 4.968°W

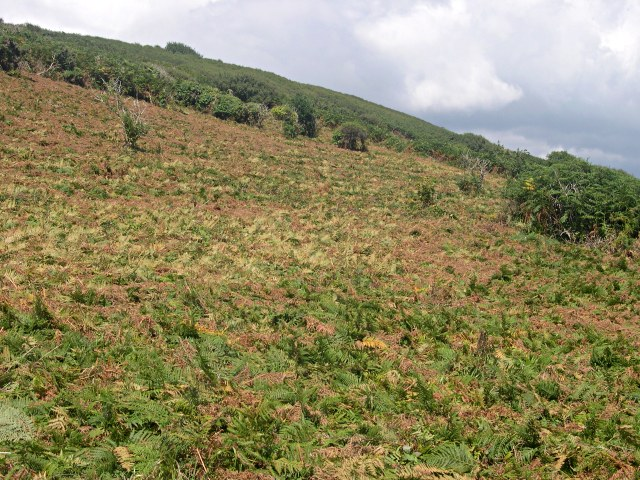
- A coastal slope near Curgurrell

- Location within Cornwall
- OS grid reference: SW883374
- Civil parish: Gerrans
- Unitary authority: Cornwall
- Ceremonial county: Cornwall
- Region: South West
- Country: England
- Sovereign state: United Kingdom
- Post town: Truro
- Postcode district: TR2

Curgurrell is a hamlet on the Roseland Peninsula north of Portscatho in Cornwall, England. Dingerein Castle, an Iron Age fort, is nearby. At the 2011 census, the population was included in the civil parish of Gerrans.
