= Clubworthy =

Hamlet in east Cornwall, England

Coordinates: 50.711°N 4.446°W

Clubworthy: Cornish: Karlonk
- Hamlet
- Location within Cornwall
- Unitary authority: Cornwall
- Region: South West
- Country: England
- Sovereign state: United Kingdom
- Police: Devon and Cornwall
- Fire: Cornwall
- Ambulance: South Western

Clubworthy (Cornish: Karlonk, meaning ravine fort) is a hamlet in east Cornwall, England, United Kingdom. It is located six miles (8.5 km) north-northwest of Launceston .
