= Langore =

Village in Cornwall, England

Coordinates: 50°39′19″N 4°24′44″W

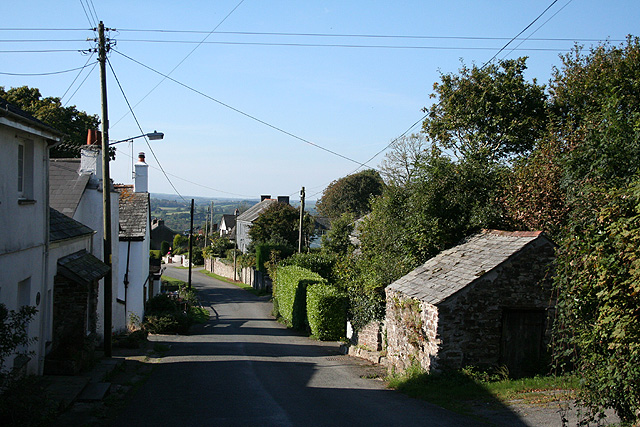
Langore

Langore (Cornish: Nansgover) is a village in Cornwall, England. It is in the parish of St Stephens by Launceston Rural (where the population of the 2011 census was included.) and is about halfway between St Stephens and Egloskerry.

== Cornish wrestling ==
Cornish wrestling matches for prizes took place at Whiteborough Tumulus near to Langore.
