= Curtismill Green =

Protected area in Essex, England

Coordinates: 51.6482°N 0.1920°E

- Site of Special Scientific Interest
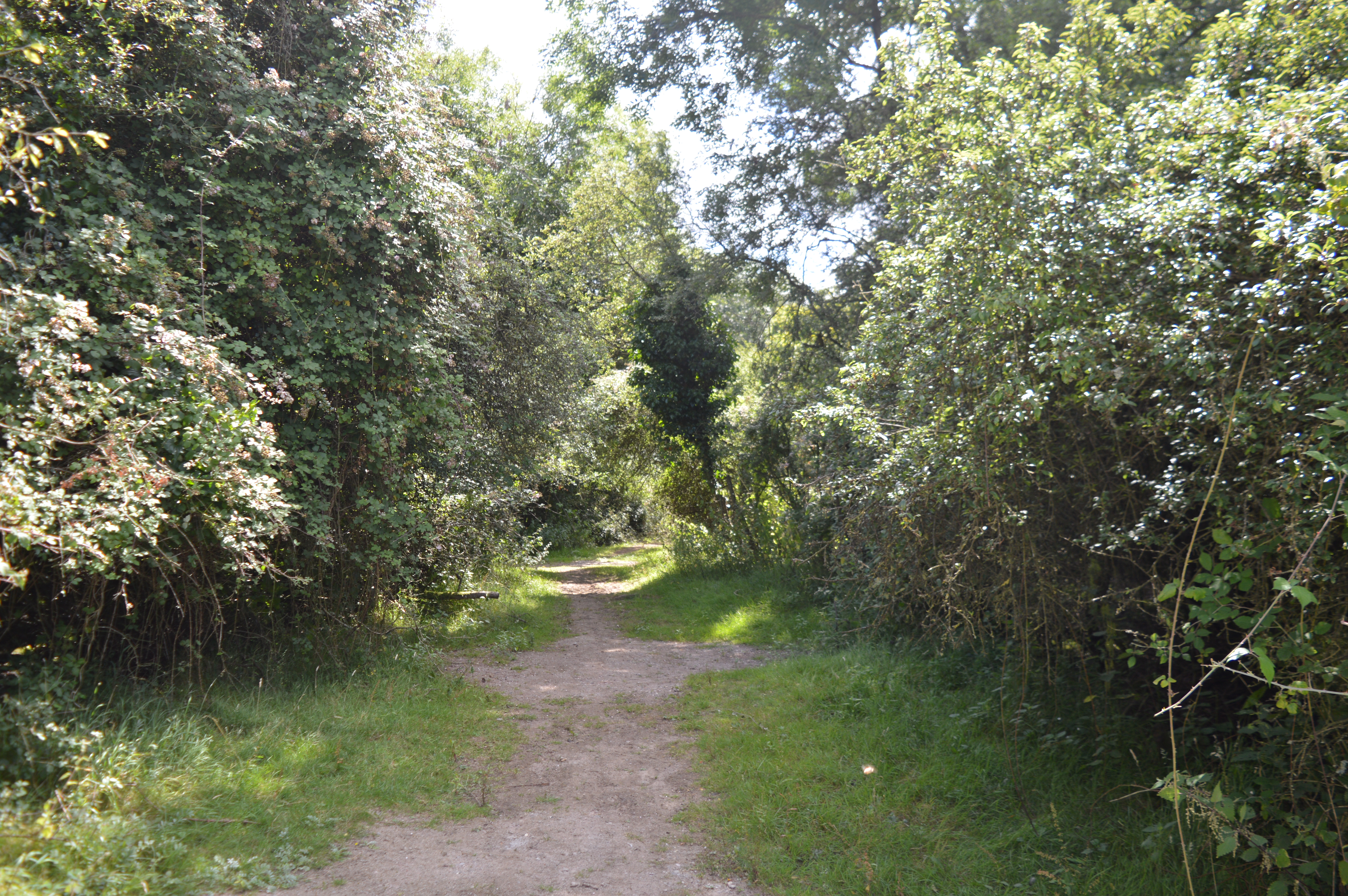
- Location of Curtismill Green.
- Area of search: Essex
- Grid reference: TQ514968; TQ524953
- Interest: Biological
- Area: 47.3 ha (117 acres)
- Notification date: 1986
- Location map: Magic Map

Curtismill Green is a 47.3-hectare (117-acre) biological Site of Special Scientific Interest between Epping and Brentwood in Essex. It is registered common land. A report by Essex County Council in 2007 stated that the site was in multiple ownership, and it was in poor condition.

The site is a relic of the ancient Forest of Waltham, of which Epping Forest is the largest surviving part. It is unimproved grassland and scrub with both damp and dry areas, with a number of uncommon species. Notable plant species in grassland areas include Orange Foxtail, Lesser Spearwort and Yellow Rattle. There are also a number of ponds.

There is public access to the site.
