= Curdridge =

Village and parish in Hampshire, England

Coordinates: 50.9213°N 1.2506°W

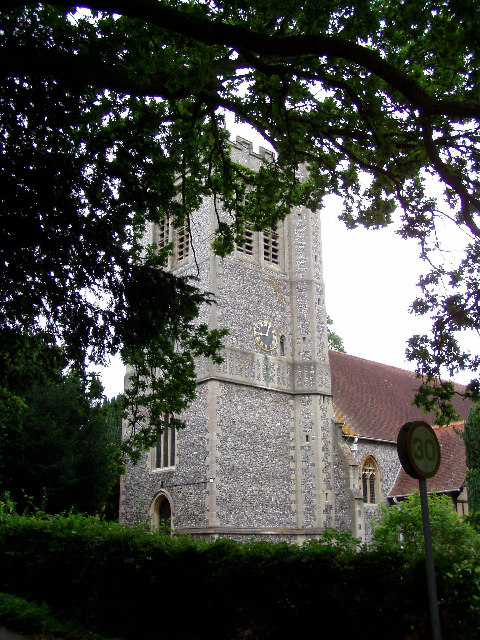
- Curdridge Church

- Location within Hampshire
- Population: 1,398 (2011)
- OS grid reference: SU5277113792
- Civil parish: Curdridge
- District: City of Winchester
- Shire county: Hampshire
- Region: South East
- Country: England
- Sovereign state: United Kingdom
- Post town: SOUTHAMPTON
- Postcode district: SO32
- Dialling code: 01489
- Police: Hampshire and Isle of Wight
- Fire: Hampshire and Isle of Wight
- Ambulance: South Central
- UK Parliament: Hamble Valley

Curdridge is a village and civil parish within the City of Winchester district of Hampshire, England. The parish also contains the similarly named village of Curbridge. The village has a small school. The parish is located eight miles to the east of Southampton and had a population of 1,292 people in 473 households in the 2001 census, the population increasing to 1,398 in 520 households at the 2011 Census. Curdridge is also known for its annual Curdridge Country Show that takes place in a field off Reading Room Lane

Although named after the nearby village of Botley, Botley railway station is actually located in the civil parish of Curdridge.

== History ==
On 11 February 2024, a large fire destroyed a historic mansion in the village. No injuries were reported.

== Geography ==
The village of Curdridge itself is 2.0 km (1.25 mi) northeast of Botley, and is on the B3051 road. The A334 passes through the southern portion of the parish. Travelling from west to east the A334 enters the parish as it crosses the River Hamble near Botley. It exits the parish, 1.75 km (1.09 mi) later as it crosses Kitnocks Gully immediately east of Lake Road. The B3051 forks off the A334 100m northeast of Botley railway station. The B3051 carries on in a generally northeast direction for approximately 2.9 km (1.8 mi) exiting the parish 100m northeast of Harfield Bungalow. Within the parish the B3051 is named Botley Road. Curdridge Lane is a road, generally wider than 4m, which crosses the parish west to east. Curdridge Lane begins at the B3051 junction with Calcot Lane. Curdridge Lane passes The Cricketers Public House, crosses the course of an old Roman road and marks the boundary of the parish for approximately 190 m (620 ft), before it makes a complete change of direction and leaves the parish at Yew Tree Farm.

== Governance ==
The village is part of the civil parish of Curdridge and is part of the Owslebury and Curdridge ward of the City of Winchester non-metropolitan district, and the Meon Valley division of Hampshire County Council.

== Church ==
The village Church is the church of St Peter. It was largely built in 1887 and 1888 to a design by Thomas Graham Jackson. A tower was added in 1895.

== Folklore and local legends ==
The local legends of two women with tragic lives are often mixed and confused in the village's folklore.

=== Kitty Nocks ===
According to local legend, Kitnocks Hill, on the Wickham road, takes its name from a young girl called Kitty Nocks, or some variation thereof, who drowned, either by suicide or accident while eloping with a lover of whom her father did not approve. Her ghost, reportedly seen by locals returning from Southampton on the bus, is now said to haunt the top of the hill.

=== Kate Hunt ===
According to local legend, Mill Hill on the Botley road was, in the 17th century, home to an elderly witch called Kate Hunt, who moved felled trees with magic, rode to Bishops Waltham on a farm gate and changed into a white hare. The elderly woman was found dead after locals from Pink Mead Farm shot the hare with a silver coin.
