= St Giles on the Heath =

Village and civil parish in west Devon, England

Coordinates: 50.689°N 4.320°W

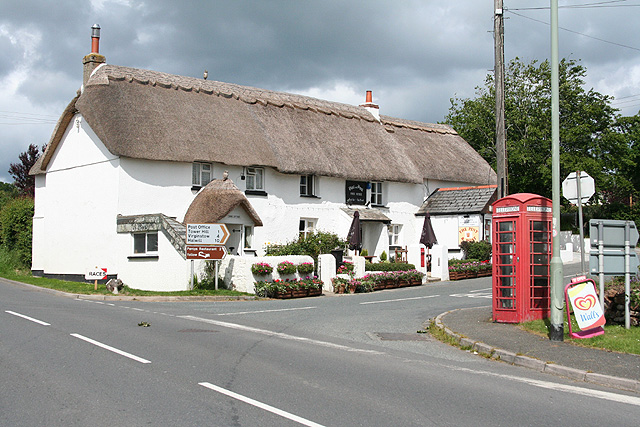
- The thatched pub and post office in the village

- Location within Devon
- Population: 617 (2001 census)
- Civil parish: St Giles on the Heath
- District: Torridge
- Shire county: Devon
- Region: South West
- Country: England
- Sovereign state: United Kingdom

St Giles on the Heath, sometimes hyphenated as St Giles-on-the-Heath, is a village and civil parish in the far west of Devon, England. It forms part of the local government district of Torridge. The village is in the east of the parish and lies on the A388 road about eight miles south of the town of Holsworthy.

The parish includes the hamlets of Hele, West Panson, East Panson, Sitcott, Box's Shop, Peter's Finger, West Druxton, Poole and Netherbridge. The parish is surrounded clockwise from the north-west by the parishes of Northcott, Luffincott, Ashwater, Virginstow, Broadwoodwidger and Lifton. Its western border follows the River Tamar which forms the county boundary with Cornwall. In 2001 its population was 617, significantly higher than the 258 residents it had in 1901. The village is part of Broadheath electoral ward. At the 2011 census the population was 1,650.

== Church history ==
Before 1193 the church of St Giles was a chapelry of North Petherwin belonging to the abbey of Tavistock. However, from 1288 it was a chapelry of St Stephen's by Launceston belonging to Launceston Priory. In 1500 the relationship between the two churches was settled; St Giles chapel was granted the right of burial and was thereafter to be served by a chaplain maintained by the priory who also served the chapel of Werrington. At the Reformation it became a donative.

The parish church, about 1.5 miles north-west of the village, is dedicated to St Giles and dates from the 13th and 15th centuries. It began as a Norman church consisting of a nave and chancel only, to which a south aisle was added in the 15th century. It has a low west tower and a Norman font, and was partially restored in 1868 by J. D. Sedding, and further in 1878 by James Piers St Aubyn.

The parish of St Giles belonged before 1876 to the Archdeaconry of Cornwall and was then included in the new Diocese of Truro to which it still belongs. St Giles-in-the-Heath forms part of Werrington with St Giles-In-The-Heath and Virginstow United Parish; the benefice is united with the benefices of Boyton and North Tamerton.
