= Curbridge, Hampshire =

Village in Hampshire, England

Coordinates: 50.9°N 1.2533°W

Curbridge
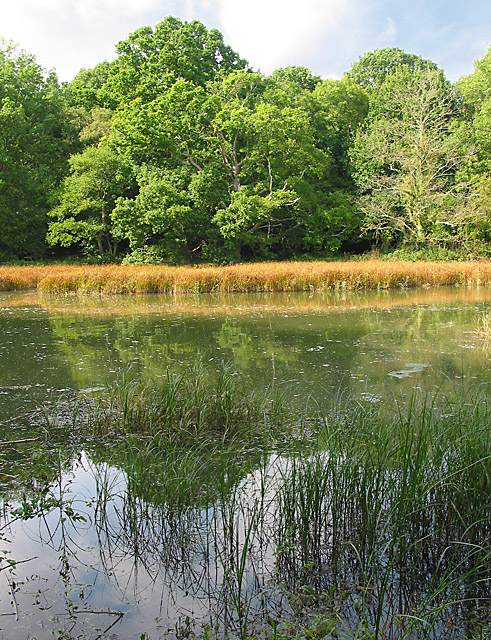
- Tidal part of River Hamble at Curbridge

- Location within Hampshire
- OS grid reference: SU5250011496
- Civil parish: Curdridge
- District: Winchester
- Shire county: Hampshire
- Region: South East
- Country: England
- Sovereign state: United Kingdom
- Post town: SOUTHAMPTON
- Postcode district: SO30
- Dialling code: 01489
- Police: Hampshire and Isle of Wight
- Fire: Hampshire and Isle of Wight
- Ambulance: South Central
- UK Parliament: Hamble Valley

Curbridge is a village and former civil parish, now in the parish of Curdridge, in the Winchester district, in the county of Hampshire, England. In 1951 the parish had a population of 444.

== Governance ==
The village is part of the Owslebury and Curdridge ward of the City of Winchester, in the Meon Valley division of Hampshire County Council. The parish was formed on 1 April 1932 from Titchfield and Sarisbury. On 1 April 1952 the parish was abolished and merged with Curdridge and Wickham.
