= Maxworthy =

Hamlet in Cornwall, England

Coordinates: 50.710°N 4.472°W

Maxworthy: Cornish: Karvacka
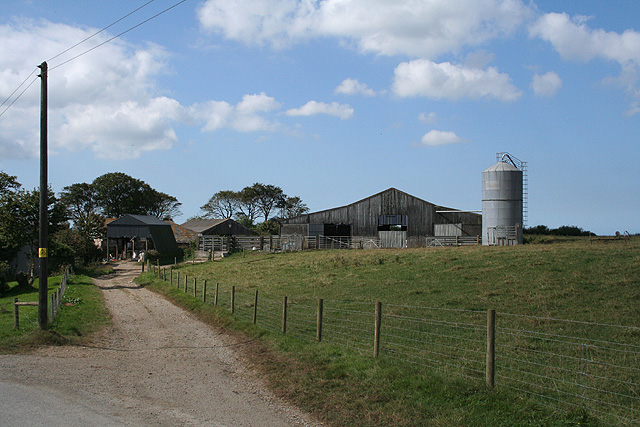
- Barns at Maxworthy

- Location within Cornwall
- OS grid reference: SX256930
- Civil parish: North Petherwin
- Unitary authority: Cornwall
- Ceremonial county: Cornwall
- Region: South West
- Country: England
- Sovereign state: United Kingdom

Maxworthy (Cornish: Karvacka) is a hamlet north of North Petherwin in east Cornwall, England.
