= Tregeare =

Hamlet in Cornwall, England

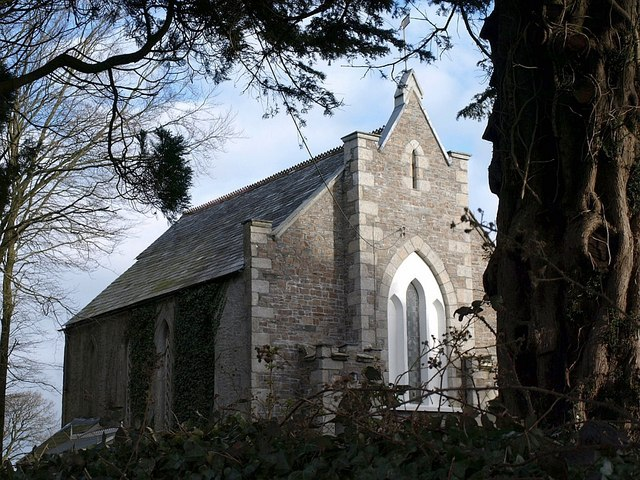
Tregeare Methodist chapel

Tregeare (Cornish: Treger) is a hamlet in the parish of Egloskerry in Cornwall, England, United Kingdom. To the east is the hill Tregearedown Beacon.

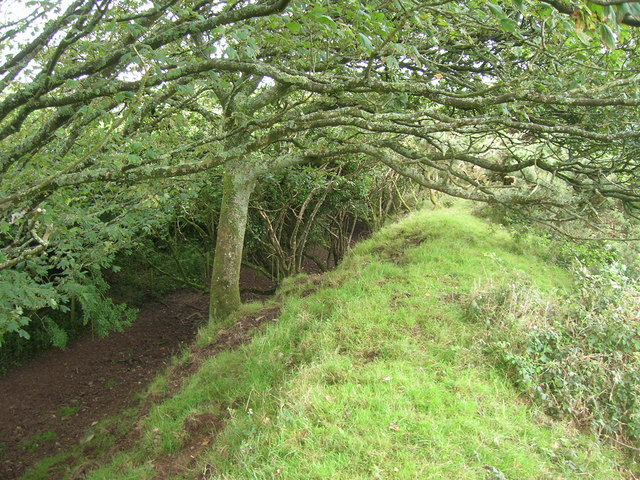
The outer defence of Tregeare Rounds

Tregeare Rounds is an Iron Age earthwork half a mile northeast of Pendoggett in the parish of St Kew. An area with a diameter of 500 ft is enclosed by two banks and ditches. As it is overlooked by higher ground to the northwest it may have been used as a cattle enclosure rather than a fortification.
