= Bennacott =

Village in Cornwall, England

Coordinates: 50.70°N 04.42°W

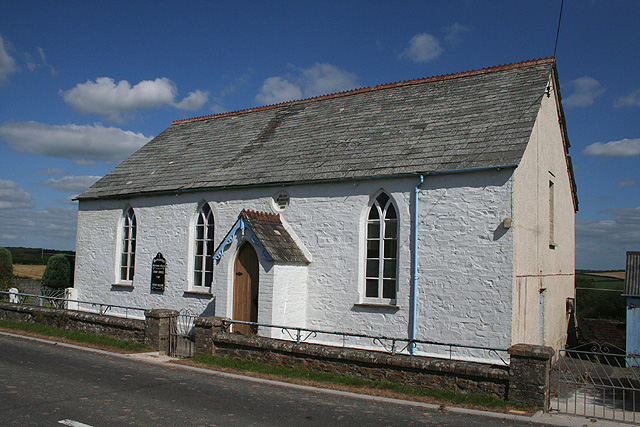
- Bennacott Methodist Church

- Location within Cornwall
- OS grid reference: SX2992
- Shire county: Cornwall
- Region: South West
- Country: England
- Sovereign state: United Kingdom
- Post town: LAUNCESTON
- Postcode district: PL15
- Police: Devon and Cornwall
- Fire: Cornwall
- Ambulance: South Western

Bennacott is a village in east Cornwall, England, in the United Kingdom. It is five miles (8 km) north of Launceston and in the parish of Boyton.
