= Egloskerry =

Village in Cornwall, England

Coordinates: 50.654°N 4.446°W

Egloskerry: Cornish: Egloskeri
- Location within Cornwall
- Population: 386 (United Kingdom Census 2011)
- OS grid reference: SX272866
- Civil parish: Egloskerry
- Unitary authority: Cornwall
- Ceremonial county: Cornwall
- Region: South West
- Country: England
- Sovereign state: United Kingdom
- Post town: LAUNCESTON
- Postcode district: PL15
- Dialling code: 01566
- Police: Devon and Cornwall
- Fire: Cornwall
- Ambulance: South Western
- UK Parliament: North Cornwall

Egloskerry (Cornish: Egloskeri) is a village and civil parish in east Cornwall, England, United Kingdom. It is situated approximately five miles (8.0 km) northwest of Launceston.

Egloskerry parish consists of the village itself and many outlying hamlets and farms, including Tregeare, Badharlick and Trebeath. There are 3,253 acres (1,316 ha) of land and 9 acres (3.6 ha) of water in the parish.

== Population ==
During the earliest census of 1801, the parish had 307 inhabitants. The population increased to a peak in 1841, when 552 people were recorded in the parish. Thereafter, the population steadily decreased to its lowest point of only 275 people in 1981. Since then, there has been a consistent increase in people living in the parish, with 374 persons residing there in 2001.

== History of Egloskerry and Penheale ==
In the village is the 15th century church of St Keri and St Petroc with original Norman wall and transept. The name comes directly from the Celtic Cornish language Eglos meaning church (the equivalent in modern Welsh being Eglwys).

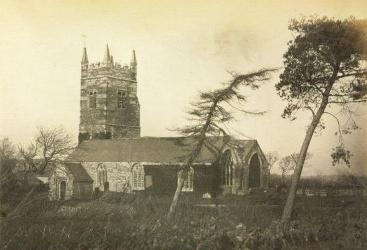
Church of St Keri and St Petroc, Egloskerry, Cornwall, England. Photo c. 1870.

The Penheale Estate is located within the parish and Penheale was mentioned as one of 284 manors in Cornwall by the Domesday Book of 1086. The Rev. Henry Addington Simcoe, son of John Graves Simcoe, purchased the estate in 1830 and was curate of Egloskerry from 1822 to 1846. He was married twice and had eleven children. Simcoe wrote and published many books from his own printing press at Penheale. He died at the manor house on 15 November 1868 and was buried in the village churchyard five days later.

A mile from the village, Penheale Manor, is early 17th century though on the site of a mediaeval house. During the 1920s, Norman Colville acquired Penheale and made extensive renovations and additions through the assistance of the famous English architect, Sir Edwin Lutyens. The original house can be dated to ca. 1620–1640, part of the gatehouse late 18th century: Lutyens's extension is to the south.

== North Cornwall Railway ==
Egloskerry railway station opened on 3 October 1892 when the London & South Western Railway, or LSWR, opened a line between Launceston and Tresmeer. The small goods yard at the station closed on 9 May 1960 and the station completely a few years later. On 3 October 1966, the line that passed through Egloskerry closed entirely.

== Literary references ==
- Thomas Hardy, in Chapter 36 of A Pair of Blue Eyes first published in 1873:

"Why, the man in Hill Street, who plays and sells flutes, trumpets, and fiddles, and grand pianners. He was talking to Egloskerry, that very small bachelor-man with money in the funds. I was going by, I'm sure, without thinking or expecting a nod from men of that glib kidney..."

Hardy, Thomas (2005), A Pair of Blue Eyes, Oxford University Press, 320.

- In the second book, Heather, of a trilogy written by John Trevena (the pseudonym of Ernest George Henham) and published in 1908:

On a cold March day any traveller by the North Cornwall line may feel conceited as well as numbed. He shivers because the wind tries to shatter the windows from Egloskerry onwards; he is proud because he cannot think what the railway would do without him; for two or three shilings he has apparently bought the train, a rheumatic locomotive which wobbles and totters seawards, and a lot of little weather-beaten stations with two or three dummy men thrown in at each one, looking like Shems, Hams and Japhets standing on wooden plates all ready for the Ark.

Trevena, John (1908), Heather, Alston Rivers, London, 424.

- John Betjeman, in his 1960 autobiography Summoned by Bells:

The emptying train, wind in the ventilators,
Puffs out of Egloskerry to Tresmeer
Through minty meadows, under bearded trees
And hills upon whose sides the clinging farms
Hold Bible Christians. Can it really be
That this same carriage came from Waterloo?

- Betjeman also mentions the rail station at Egloskerry in First and Last Loves (1952):

Green Southern Railway engines came right into the brown and cream Great Western district of Cornwall, to reach Padstow, Launceston, Egloskerry, Otterham, Tresmeer, Camelford – and so on, down that windy single line. I know the stations by heart, the slate and granite-built waiting rooms, the oil lamps and veronica bushes.

== Legal precedent ==
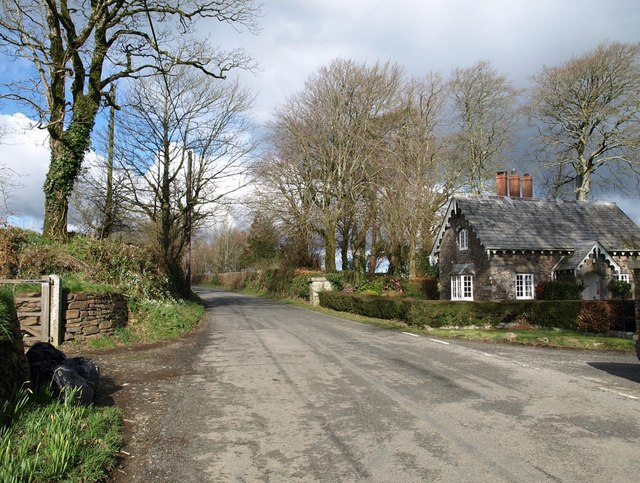
The lodge, Penheale Manor

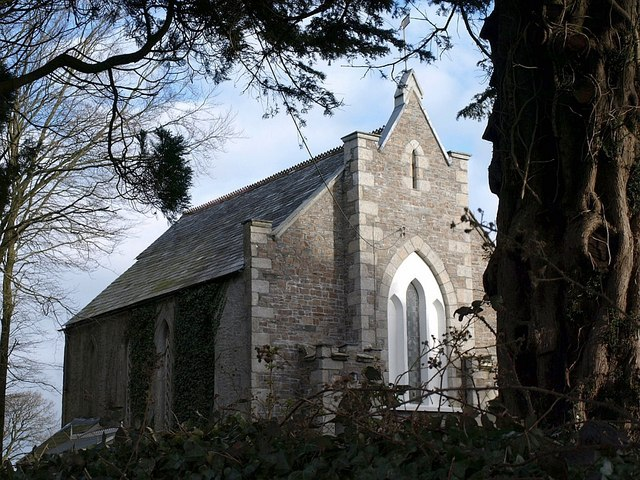
Tregeare Methodist chapel

- In an 1898 opinion from the Queen's Bench titled Simcoe v. Pethick, certain property had been set aside for residents in the village of Egloskerry to remove turf, subject to oversight by the churchwardens and overseers of the poor. Pethick entered on the land and removed wood over the objection of the lord of the manor, Simcoe, the son of Rev. Henry Addington Simcoe, who claimed that he had the ownership rights to the land and to the removal of turf and wood. The court held that the churchwardens and overseers had the legal right to regulate the manner in which turf could be removed from the property, not the lord of the manor. Simcoe v. Pethick, 2 Q.B. 55(1898). The case was widely cited as an important precedent for public land rights in England.
