= North Petherwin =

Village in Cornwall, England

Coordinates: 50.681°N 4.434°W

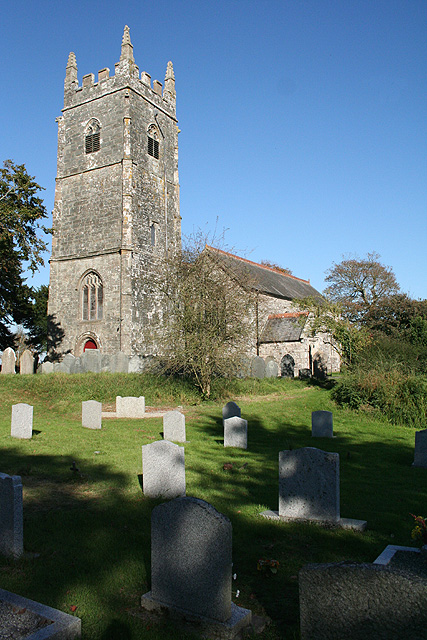
- North Petherwin parish church

- Location within Cornwall
- Population: 655 (Civil Parish, 1991)
- OS grid reference: SX282896
- Civil parish: North Petherwin
- Unitary authority: Cornwall
- Ceremonial county: Cornwall
- Region: South West
- Country: England
- Sovereign state: United Kingdom
- Post town: LAUNCESTON
- Postcode district: PL15
- Dialling code: 01566
- Police: Devon and Cornwall
- Fire: Cornwall
- Ambulance: South Western
- UK Parliament: North Cornwall

North Petherwin is a civil parish and village in the ceremonial county of Cornwall, England, United Kingdom. The village is situated five miles (8.0 km) northwest of Launceston on a ridge above the River Ottery valley.

North Petherwin is a rural parish within the historic boundaries of Devon, responsibility for its administration having been transferred to Cornwall by the abolition of Broadwoodwidger Rural District by the Local Government Commission for England in 1966. Historically, the Dukes of Bedford have been major land owners in the parish. As well as the church town, settlements include Hellescott, Brazacott, and Maxworthy. The hamlets of Petherwin Gate and Daws are close to the village.

== Attractions ==
The parish was previously home to the Tamar Otter and Wildlife Centre, but this has now closed permanently and been replaced with a café and nature trail.

== Parish church ==
The parish church is dedicated to St Paternus (see also South Petherwin) and is unusually grand for a small village church. It was described in White's Devonshire Directory of 1850 as: ... an ancient structure, with a tower and five bells... (containing)... memorials of the Yeo and other families. The north aisle is Norman and the south Perpendicular and many of the windows, including those of the clerestory, are 13th century in style. There is some old woodwork including a communion rail dated 1685.

The tower now houses six bells, hung for full circle ringing in the English style. They are rung from the ground floor where the ringers are really part of the church as, unusually, the tower has not been screened off. In the North aisle, within the vestry, stands a fine two manual organ. The organ was extensively overhauled at the turn of this century and its thirteen speaking stops provide reliable accompaniment to services and concerts.

== Education ==
The village has a school, North Petherwin Primary School, dating back to 1878. The school is coeducational and has been expanded in recent years.

== See also ==
- Broadwoodwidger Rural District
- Local Government Commission for England (1958–1967)
