= List of crossings of the River Tamar =

== List of crossings of the River Tamar ==
Listed below are all crossings of the River Tamar, in order heading downstream. All cross the county boundary between Devon and Cornwall, except for four that are noted.

Crossing	Type	Coordinates	Carries	Date	Heritage Status	Notes	Photo
(between East and West Youlstone)	Road bridge	50.9139°N 4.4626°W	Country lane		-	The highest bridge on the Tamar, excepting culverts and other very minor crossings nearer the source; 186 metres (610 ft) above sea level.	Entering_Kernow_-_geograph.org.uk_-_698176
Youlstone Ham Bridge	Road bridge	50.9064°N 4.4521°W	Country lane		-		
Buse's Mill	Road bridge	50.8945°N 4.4459°W	Country lane		-		
Tamar Lake Water Sports Centre	Foot/Cycle bridge	50.892°N 4.4462°W	Cycle Path		-		Cycle_track_bridge_at_the_north_of_Upper_Tamar_Lake_-_geograph.org.uk_-_2982577
Upper Tamar Lake Dam	Dam walkway	50.8802°N 4.4326°W	Public footpath		-	Passes atop of the reservoir dam.	Upper_Tamar_Lake_Dam_Overflowing_-_panoramio
Tamar Lake Water Sports Centre	Foot/Cycle bridge	50.8783°N 4.4311°W	Cycle Path		-		
Alfardisworthy New Bridge	Road bridge	50.8768°N 4.4294°W	Country lane		-	Immediately to the east is the historic boundary stone at the site of the old bridge, which crossed the original route of the Tamar, now just within Devon.	New_Bridge_over_River_Tamar_-_geograph.org.uk_-_2982623
Lower Tamar Lake Spillway	Footbridge	50.8715°N 4.4228°W	Public footpath		-	Crosses the discharge of the reservoir – however not the county boundary, which follows a previous routing of the river. (Entirely in Devon.)	Lower_Tamar_Lake_spillway_-_geograph.org.uk_-_914820
(near Virworthy)	Road bridge	50.8668°N 4.4211°W	Country lane		-		Bridge_over_River_Tamar_at_Virworthy
(near Dexbeer)	Road bridge	50.8547°N 4.4236°W	Country lane		-	The bridge does not cross the county boundary – it connects a part of Devon that is west of the Tamar. (Entirely in Devon.)	Bridge_over_the_Tamar_-_geograph.org.uk_-_4983001
Moretonmill Bridge	Road bridge	50.8502°N 4.44°W	Country lane		-	113 metres (371 ft) above sea level	Entering_Cornwall_-_geograph.org.uk_-_5599122
Burmsdon Aqueduct	Canal aqueduct	50.8336°N 4.4426°W	Bude Canal (Holsworthy Branch)	1821	II	Canal derelict since 1891; the towpath however remains open as a public footpath.	
Kingford Mill	Road bridge	50.8285°N 4.4435°W	Driveway		-	Private	
Blackpool Bridge	Road bridge	50.8247°N 4.4402°W	Country lane		-		Blackpool_Bridge_-_geograph.org.uk_-_425357
Tamarstone Bridge	Road bridge	50.8235°N 4.4388°W	A3072 road (Holsworthy – Bude)		-		
Bridgerule Bridge	Road bridge	50.7996°N 4.4495°W	Village road	1923	-	The bridge no longer crosses the county boundary – since 1844 the bridge connects a part of Devon that is west of the Tamar. (Entirely in Devon.)	
Bridgerule Railway Bridge	Railway bridge	50.7868°N 4.452°W	Okehampton to Bude Line	(in use from 1898)	-	Dismantled (line closed in 1966)	
Crowford Bridge	Road bridge	50.769°N 4.4307°W	Country lane		-		
(North) Tamerton Bridge	Road bridge	50.7517°N 4.3858°W	Local road	1851	II	The bridge no longer crosses the county boundary – since 1844 the bridge connects a part of Cornwall that is east of the Tamar. (Entirely in Cornwall.)	Tamerton_Bridge_-_geograph.org.uk_-_4873731
Boyton Bridge	Road bridge	50.7058°N 4.3687°W	Country lane	c. 1614 / 2005	-	Main span replaced in 2005.	Boyton_Bridge_-_geograph.org.uk_-_533974
Druxton Bridge	Road bridge	50.6711°N 4.3444°W	Country lane	c. 16th century	II*	The bridge connected a part of Devon that was west of the Tamar, until boundary changes in 1966.	Druxton_Bridge
Nether Bridge	Road bridge	50.6568°N 4.3378°W	A388 road (Holsworthy – Launceston)	1986	-	Replacement for the older, narrower Higher New Bridge	Nether Bridge, River Tamar
Higher New Bridge	Road bridge	50.6565°N 4.3372°W	Country lane	c. early 16th century	I	Remains open	Higher_New_Bridge,_River_Tamar
St Leonards Railway Bridge	Railway bridge	50.6413°N 4.3336°W	North Cornwall Railway	(in use from 1886)	-	Dismantled (line closed in 1966)	
Polson Bridge	Road bridge	50.6407°N 4.3269°W	A388 road	1833 / 1934	II	The former A30 route into Launceston (a by-pass was built in 1975); the main span was replaced in 1934.	Polson_Bridge_-_geograph.org.uk_-_329592
Lower Barnham Railway Bridge	Railway bridge	50.6386°N 4.326°W	South Devon and Tavistock Railway	(in use from 1865)	-	Dismantled (line closed in 1966)	
Dunheved Bridge	Road bridge (dual carriageway)	50.637°N 4.3229°W	A30 trunk road	1975 / 2006	-	Part of the Launceston by-pass; the road deck was replaced in 2006/7.	
Greystone Bridge	Road bridge	50.5999°N 4.3069°W	B3362 road	1439	I	44 metres (144 ft) above sea level	Greystone_Bridge_-_geograph.org.uk_-_4700398
Horsebridge	Road bridge	50.5517°N 4.2598°W	Country lane	1437	I	Oldest extant bridge on the Tamar. Grade I listed.	Horsebridge_-_geograph.org.uk_-_442438
(Lamerhooe)	Ford	50.5377°N 4.2604°W	Unpaved public road		-	Not maintained and deep – not suitable for most motor vehicles.	Latchley_Ford_on_the_River_Tamar_-_geograph.org.uk_-_2422888
Gunnislake New Bridge	Road bridge	50.5286°N 4.212°W	A390 road	1520	I	Lowest bridge on the non-tidal river; until 1962 the lowest road bridge on the Tamar.	New_Bridge,_Gunnislake_-_geograph.org.uk_-_1211279
Calstock Ferry	Passenger ferry	50.498°N 4.2162°W	Calstock to Ferry Farm and Cotehele		-	(reinstated - Calstock Ferry)	
Calstock Viaduct	Railway viaduct	50.4966°N 4.21°W	Tamar Valley Line	1907 (in use from 1908)	II*		Calstock_Viaduct_-_geograph.org.uk_-_3865122
Tamar Bridge	Road bridge	50.4082°N 4.2032°W	A38 trunk road	1961	-	Toll (eastbound only); opened in 1962.	The_Tamar_Bridge_-_geograph.org.uk_-_5001198
Royal Albert Bridge	Railway bridge	50.4076°N 4.2035°W	Cornish Main Line	1859	I	The lowest bridge on the Tamar	Royal_Albert_Bridge_2009
Torpoint Ferry	Vehicle ferry	50.3758°N 4.1839°W	A374 road (Torpoint to Devonport)	1791	-	Chain ferry; carries vehicles, (motor)cyclists and pedestrians.	Torpoint_Ferry,_"The_Plym"_-_geograph.org.uk_-_64629
Cremyll Ferry	Passenger ferry	50.3605°N 4.1748°W	Cremyll to Stonehouse, Plymouth	Ancient	-	Carries passengers and cyclists (only)	Cremyll_Ferry_at_Cremyll
