= Alfardisworthy =

Hamlet in Devon, England

Coordinates: 50.878°N 4.425°W

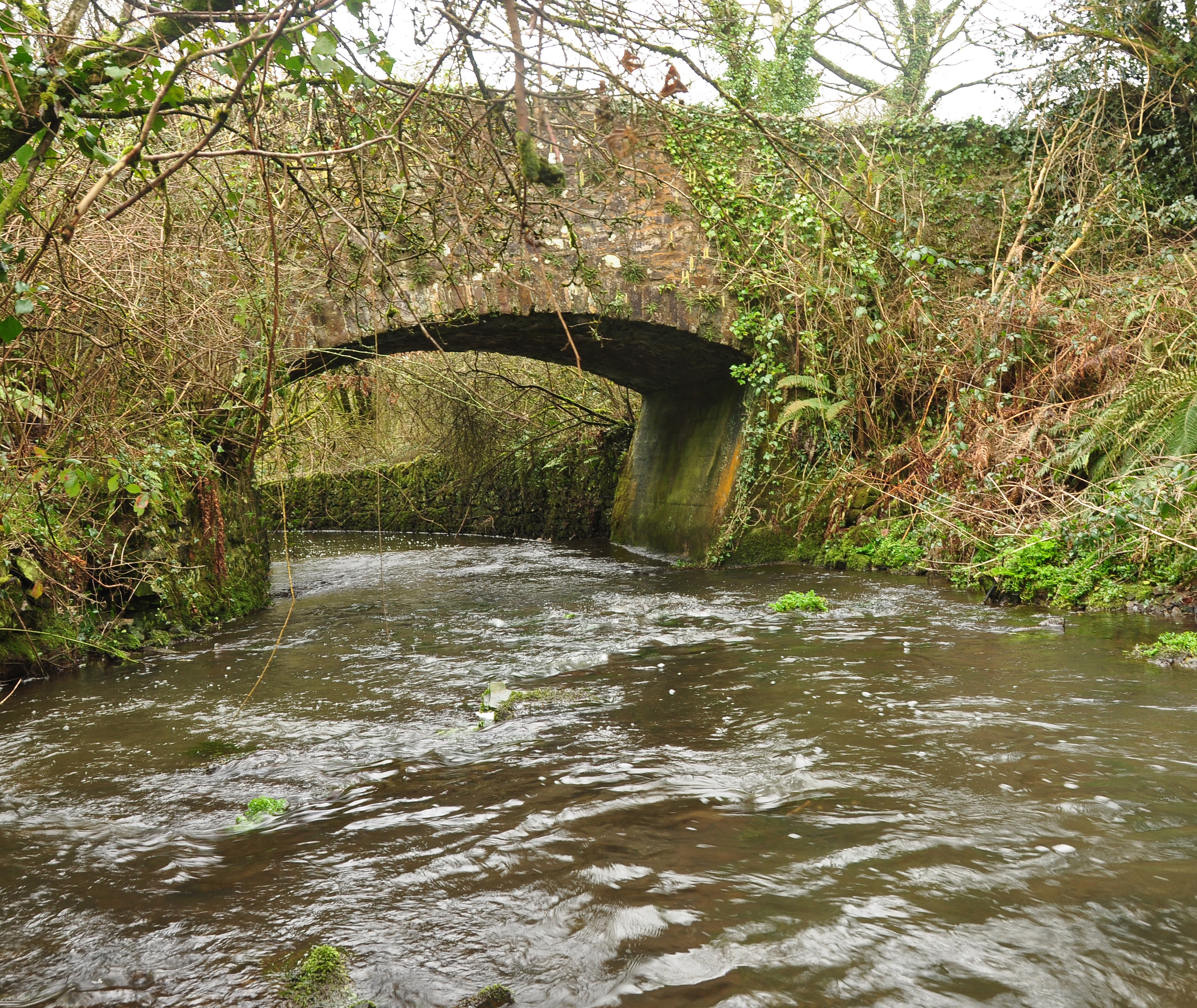
- Alfardisworthy New Bridge

- Location within Devon
- OS grid reference: SS294115
- Civil parish: Bradworthy
- District: Torridge
- Shire county: Devon
- Region: South West
- Country: England
- Sovereign state: United Kingdom
- Police: Devon and Cornwall
- Fire: Devon and Somerset
- Ambulance: South Western

Alfardisworthy is a hamlet in Devon, England, which straddles the border with Cornwall. To the northwest is a reservoir, named Upper Tamar Lake, which provides water for the town of Bude and surrounding areas. To the south is Lower Tamar Lake which was constructed to supply the Bude Canal with water. Alfardisworthy is in the parish of Bradworthy.

== Toponymy ==
Alfardisworthy (or Alsworthy) is derived from Alfheard's wordig, meaning farm enclosure. It is believed the manor of Fereude/Fereudi mentioned in the Domesday Book was located at Alfardisworthy. The name Lower Alfardisworthy appears in 18th-century tax records.
