= River Deer =

River in Devon, England

Coordinates: 50°45′03″N 4°23′03″W

The River Deer is river in Devon, a tributary of the River Tamar, joining it at North Tamerton.

== Toponymy ==
The root of the name is uncertain, since no early forms have been found (in 1929 to 1931 Deer is used in Moore's History of Devonshire). A suggested back-formation is from Derriton, perhaps supported by aqua de Dyraton from 1282 in the Assize Rolls.
