= River Tamar =

River in south-west England

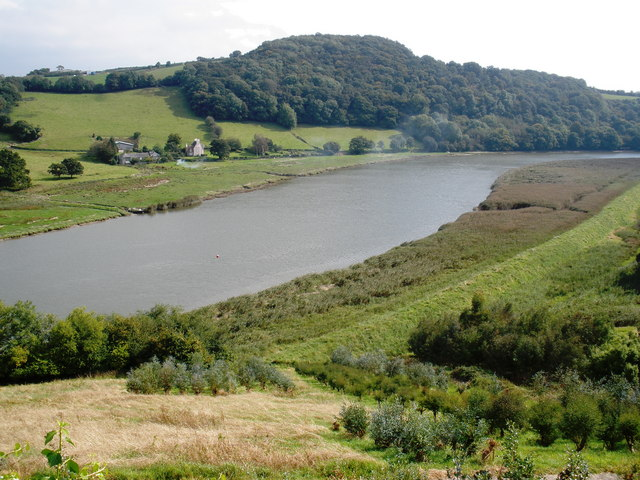
- The Tamar, near Bohetherick

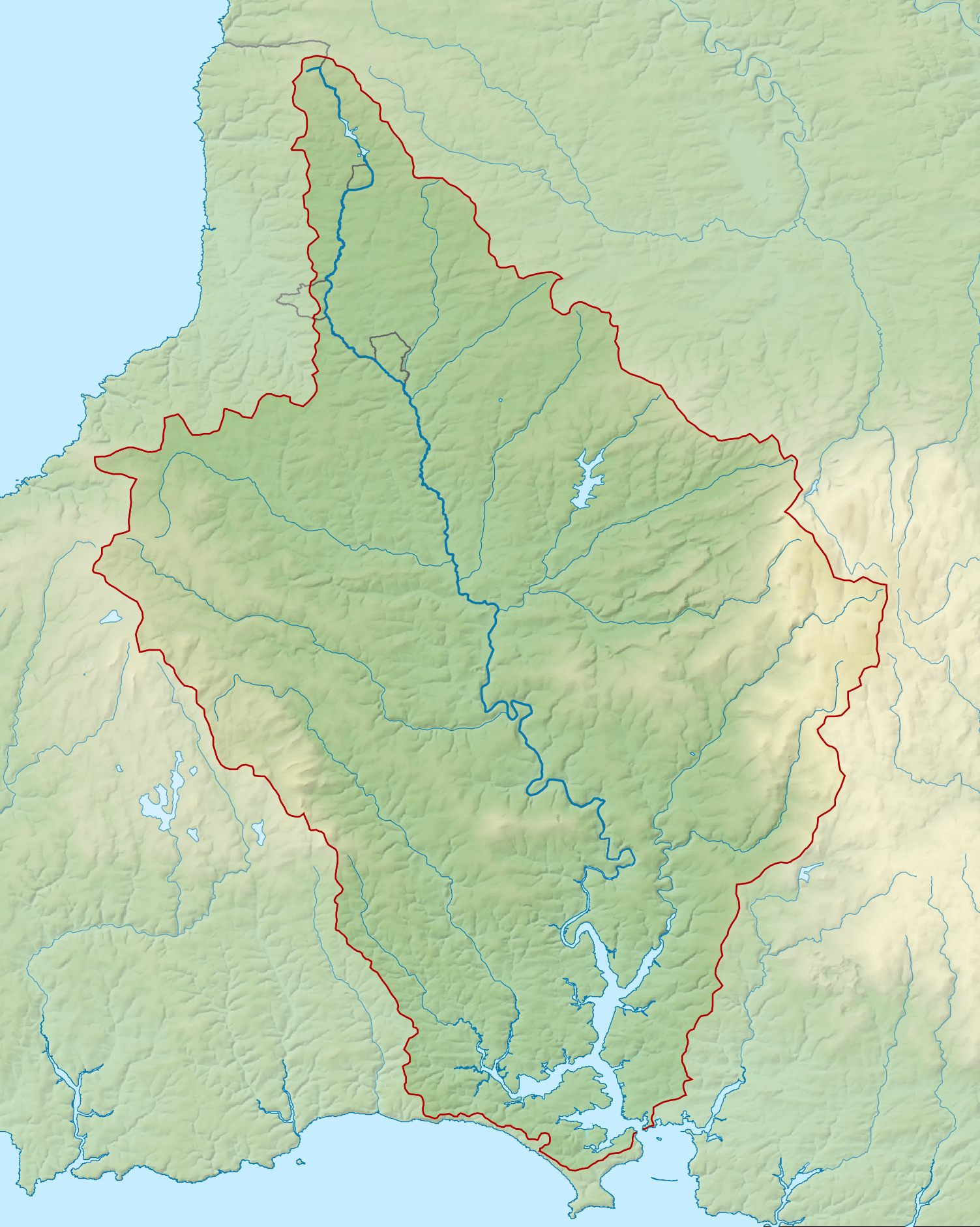
- Map of the Tamar catchment
- Native name: Dowr Tamar (Cornish)

Location
- Country: England
- Region: Cornwall, Devon

Physical characteristics
- Source: Woolley Moor, Morwenstow parish
  - location: 50.9235°N 4.4622°W, Cornwall
  - elevation: 206 m (676 ft)
- Mouth: Hamoaze
  - location: Plymouth Sound, English Channel
  - coordinates: 50°21′30″N 4°10′0″W
- Length: 98 km (61 mi)
- Discharge
  - location: Gunnislake
  - average: 22.55 m^{3}/s (796 cu ft/s)
  - minimum: 0.58 m^{3}/s (20 cu ft/s)23 August 1976
  - maximum: 714.6 m^{3}/s (25,240 cu ft/s)28 December 1979
- Discharge
  - location: Crowford Bridge
  - average: 2.34 m^{3}/s (83 cu ft/s)

Basin features
- Tributaries
  - left: Deer and Tavy
  - right: Inny, Ottery, Kensey and Lynher

The Tamar (/ˈteɪmɑːr/; Cornish: Dowr Tamar) is a river in south-west England that forms most of the border between Devon (to the east) and Cornwall (to the west). A large part of the valley of the Tamar is protected as the Tamar Valley National Landscape (Note: Formerly known as an Area of Outstanding Natural Beauty.) and some is included in the Cornwall and West Devon Mining Landscape (Note: A World Heritage Site.) due to its historic mining activities.

The Tamar's source is less than 3.7 miles (6.0 km) from the north Cornish coast, but it flows southward across the peninsula to the south coast. The total length of the river is 61 miles (98 km). At its mouth, the Tamar flows into the Hamoaze before entering Plymouth Sound, a bay in the English Channel. Tributaries of the river include the rivers Inny, Ottery, Kensey and Lynher (or St Germans River) on the Cornish side and the Deer and Tavy on the Devon side.

The name Tamar (or Tamare) was mentioned by Ptolemy in the second century AD in his Geography. The name is said to mean "great water". The Tamar is one of several British rivers whose ancient name is assumed by some to be derived from a prehistoric river word apparently meaning "dark flowing" and which it shares with the River Thames.

The seventh-century Ravenna Cosmography mentions a Roman settlement named Tamaris, but it is unclear to which of those towns along the Tamar this refers. Plymouth, Launceston and the Roman fort at Calstock have been variously suggested.

== Environment ==
The river (and/or land on its banks) is designated as a Site of Special Scientific Interest (SSSI), a European Special Area of Conservation, and an Area of Outstanding Natural Beauty. A part of it is also designated as a UNESCO World Heritage Site as part of the Cornwall and West Devon Mining Landscape.

In November 2013, South West Water was fined £50,000 after it admitted permitting the discharge of sewage from its Camels Head treatment plant into a tributary of the river Tamar for eight years.

=== Tamar Valley National Landscape ===
Together, the Tamar, Tavy and Lynher form the Tamar Valley National Landscape, a designated Area of Outstanding Natural Beauty. It covers around 195 km^{2} (75 sq mi) around the lower Tamar (below Launceston) and its tributaries the Tavy and the Lynher. It was first proposed in 1963, but was not designated until 1995. The highest point in the AONB is Kit Hill, 334 metres above sea level. The Tamar Discovery Trail is a 35-mile hiking route following the course of the Tamar through the valley.

=== Special Area of Conservation ===
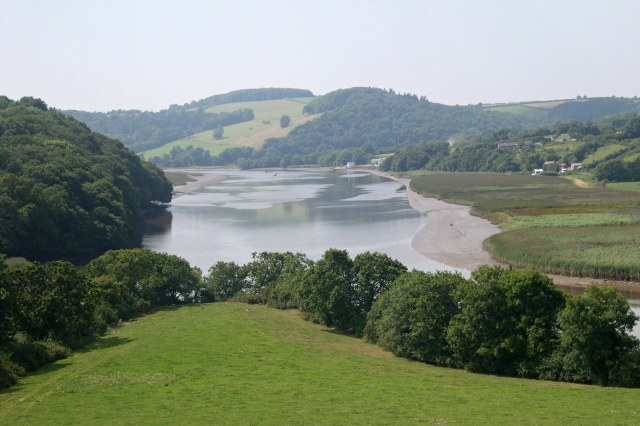
The tidal river, between Cotehele Quay and Weir Quay, with its mudbanks and reed beds

The Plymouth Sound and Estuaries are a Special Area of Conservation. Rocky reefs in low salinity estuarine conditions far inland on the Tamar are very unusual and support species such as the hydroid Cordylophora caspia. The Tamar is one of a few estuaries where zonation of rocky habitats (intertidal and subtidal) can be observed along an estuarine gradient.

=== Site of Special Scientific Interest ===
The Tamar–Tavy Estuary is a Site of Special Scientific Interest (SSSI) covering the tidal estuaries of the Tamar and the Tavy. Part of the Tamar estuary also forms the Tamar Estuary Nature Reserve, owned by the Cornwall Wildlife Trust. The site was designated in 1991 for its biodiversity and varying habitats that support a large number of wader and wildfowl species, as well as the special interest of its marine biology. The site supports a nationally important wintering population of avocet and supports species such as black-tailed godwit, Eurasian whimbrel, greenshank, spotted redshank, green sandpiper and golden plover.

=== UNESCO World Heritage Site ===
Throughout human history the valley has been almost continuously exploited for its rich mineral and metal deposits including silver, tin, lead and arsenic leaving a unique archaeological landscape which forms a significant part of the Cornwall and West Devon Mining Landscape. Remains include wheal or engine houses, deep and open cast mines dating from the Bronze Age through to the medieval and modern era, the export docks at Morwellham Quay were once an international centre of trade in copper, lead and arsenic. The valley, with the stannary town of Tavistock was added to the World Heritage List during the 30th Session of the UNESCO World Heritage Committee in Vilnius, July 2006.

=== Water quality ===
The Environment Agency measures the water quality of the river systems in England. Each is given an overall ecological status, which may be one of five levels: high, good, moderate, poor and bad. There are several components that are used to determine this, including biological status, which looks at the quantity and varieties of invertebrates, angiosperms and fish. Chemical status, which compares the concentrations of various chemicals against known safe concentrations, is rated good or fail.

Water quality of the River Tamar in 2019
Section	Ecological Status	Chemical Status	Overall Status	Length	Catchment Area	Channel
Upper River Tamar	Moderate	Fail	Moderate	13.417 km (8.337 mi)	23.901 km^{2} (9.228 sq mi)	
Tamar (Small Brook to Lamberal Water)	Poor	Fail	Poor	7.458 km (4.634 mi)	14.966 km^{2} (5.778 sq mi)	
Tamar (River Ottery to River Deer)	Moderate	Fail	Moderate	20.879 km (12.974 mi)	48.056 km^{2} (18.555 sq mi)	
Tamar (River Ottery to River Lyd)	Moderate	Fail	Moderate	5.318 km (3.304 mi)	7.768 km^{2} (2.999 sq mi)	
Tamar (River Lyd to River Inny)	Moderate	Fail	Moderate	8.829 km (5.486 mi)	13.417 km^{2} (5.180 sq mi)	
Lower River Tamar	Moderate	Fail	Moderate	38.087 km (23.666 mi)	65.516 km^{2} (25.296 sq mi)	
Plymouth Tamar	Moderate	Fail	Moderate			Heavily modified

== Geography ==
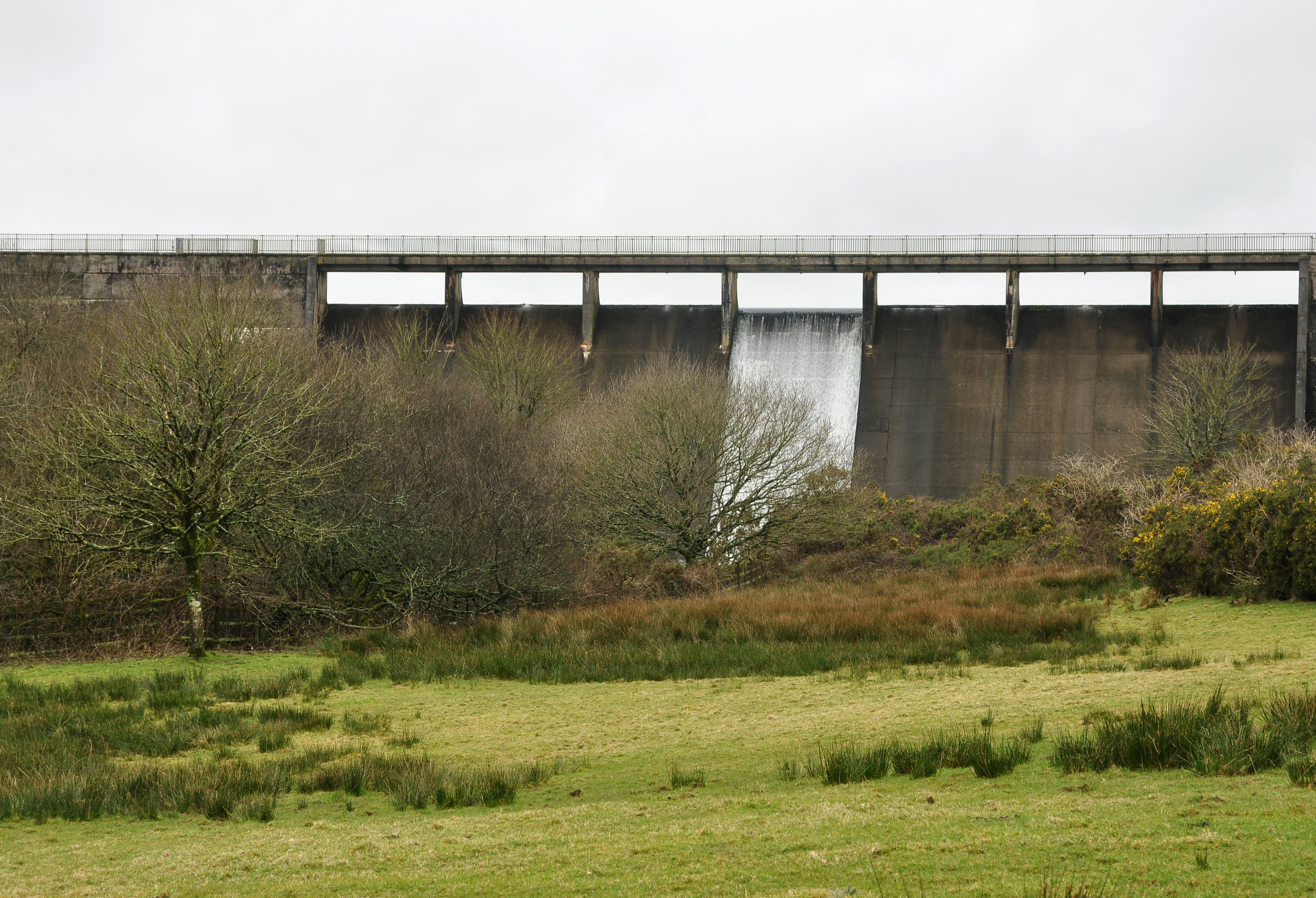
The dam of the Upper Tamar Lake.

=== Sources ===
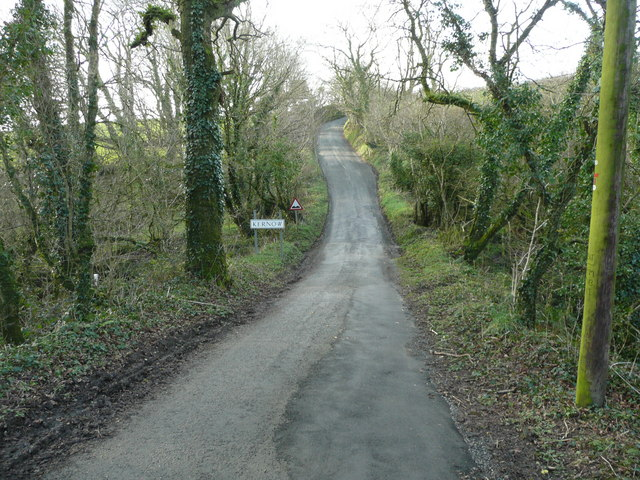
The most northerly bridge over the river

According to Ordnance Survey mapping, the source of the Tamar is at Woolley Moor, approximately 3.5 miles (5.6 km) from the north Cornish coast, at 50.9184°N 4.4633°W. The location of the spring is a "high windswept plateau largely devoid of farmland, and inhabited by stunted trees and wiry undergrowth." The exact source of the river is difficult to pinpoint, because it arises "from a boggy morass...behind a hedge near some willow trees at Woolley Barrows... A small square stone culvert drains the first tentative trickle of water away from the bog, through a hedge and into a ditch. From here, a pipe carries the water under the highway and the infant river Tamar is on its way to the sea at Plymouth."

=== Reservoirs ===
The Upper Tamar Lake and Lower Tamar Lake are two small reservoirs on the Tamar's upper course. The Lower Lake was constructed in the 1820s to feed the Bude Canal; it is now a nature reserve. The Upper Lake was constructed in the 1970s and supplies fresh water to the Bude area, as well as having some recreational use.

=== Border ===
The east bank of the Tamar was fixed as the border of Cornwall by King Athelstan in the year 936. Several villages north of Launceston, to the west of the Tamar, were transferred to Devon at some point in the eleventh century when the border was changed to follow the River Ottery westward, rather than the Tamar. The county boundary was restored to the Tamar in 1966, when the civil parishes of North Petherwin and Werrington were transferred from Devon to Cornwall. The Counties (Detached Parts) Act 1844 ensured parishes were entirely within one county. It transferred a part of the Rame Peninsula (on the west side of the Hamoaze) from Devon to Cornwall (namely, parts of the parishes of Maker and St John). The Act also transferred part of the parish of Bridgerule to Devon and part of the parish of North Tamerton to Cornwall — these latter transfers created two of the present-day 'exceptions' to the river boundary.

The modern administrative border between Devon and Cornwall more closely follows the Tamar and Hamoaze than the 'historic' county border (of the 11th to 19th centuries). Only three 'exceptions' to the rule that the border follows the river (from source to sea) currently exist, all of which are upstream of the confluence of the river Deer, in the upper course of the Tamar. Part of the Cornish civil parish of North Tamerton extends east across the river, whilst parts of the Devon civil parishes of Bridgerule and Pancrasweek extend west across the Tamar. Where the border does follow the Tamar, it is defined as being along a line running at the centre of the river — where the river is tidal, it is the centre of the low water channel. This "centre of river" arrangement ends just upstream of the Tamar Bridge at Saltash, downstream of which the counties officially extend only to their respective (tidal) bank's low water mark. The river is dammed at two points of its upper course, forming two reservoirs in place of the natural river: at Upper Tamar Lake the border follows the line of the river as it was prior to the construction of the reservoir (therefore now within the lake), whilst at the older Lower Tamar Lake the border was re-aligned along a (now disused) re-routing of the river to the reservoir's west side, placing the lake in Devon.

=== Crossings ===
List of crossings of the River Tamar

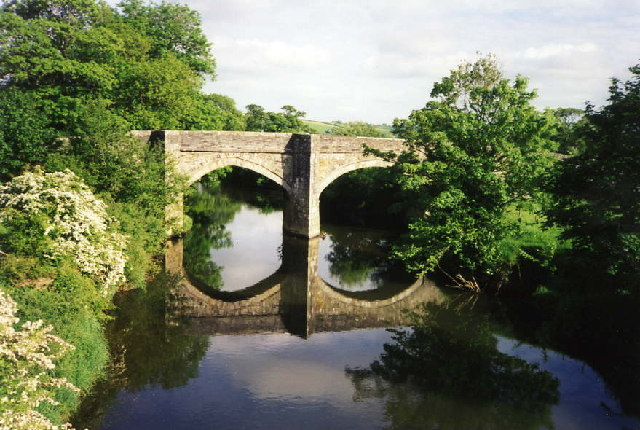
Higher New Bridge, near St Stephen by Launceston

The river has 22 road crossings, including some medieval stone bridges. The oldest bridge still extant is at Horsebridge (1437) and the next oldest is Greystone Bridge near Lawhitton; this arched stone bridge was built in 1439. Gunnislake New Bridge was built in 1520 by Sir Piers Edgcumbe, the owner of Cotehele and Mount Edgcumbe. The Gunnislake bridge was a main route into south-east Cornwall and the lowest bridge over the Tamar until the Tamar Bridge at Saltash was opened in 1962.

The lower Tamar is spanned also by the Royal Albert Bridge (built 1859), a railway bridge now adjacent to the newer Tamar Bridge. Both of these bridges are between Saltash (known as the 'Gateway to Cornwall') and Plymouth. Further downstream, crossing the Hamoaze, is the Torpoint Ferry — a chain ferry connecting Torpoint to Devonport — and at the most downstream part of the Hamoaze there is also the Cremyll Ferry.

The Calstock Viaduct is another notable structure on the Tamar, being 120 feet (37 m) high with twelve 60 feet (18 m) wide arches, of which three of the piers stand in the river; it was built between 1904 and 1907.

== Navigation ==
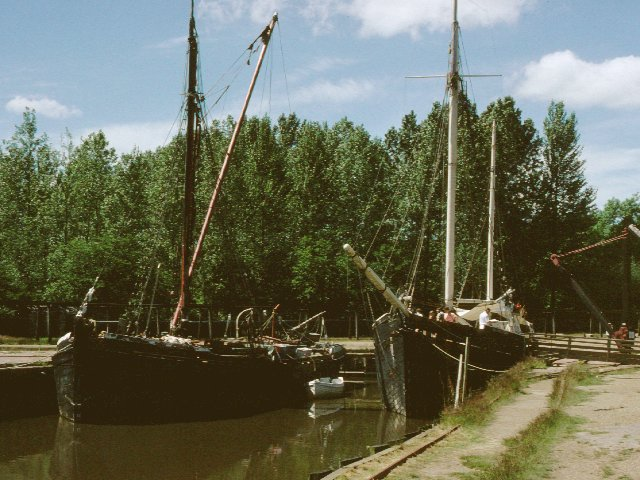
Loading dock at Morwellham; once an important industrial port, it featured an inclined plane which led up to the Tavistock Canal

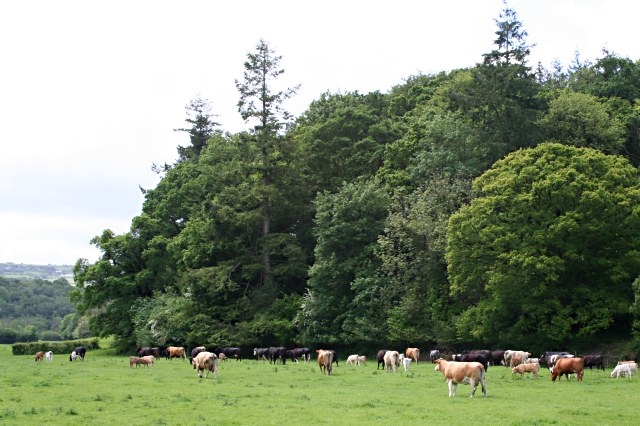
Cattle pasture near Horsebridge

The total length of the tidal river (which, like other tidal waters in England, has public right of navigation) is 19.2 miles (30.9 km). The normal tidal limit (Note: Noted on Ordnance Survey maps as 'NTL'.) is a weir just downstream of the village of Gunnislake. Waterborne traffic through the Hamoaze is controlled by the Queen's Harbour Master for Plymouth, who is responsible for managing navigation along the entire tidal Tamar.

The Royal Navy has one of its three main naval bases at Devonport, situated on the Hamoaze, upstream of which the river is now used largely by recreational craft. Excursions operate (April to October only) on the river between Plymouth and Calstock; excursions used to operate as far as Morwellham Quay, but were suspended indefinitely in 2016. A passenger ferry also operates April to October between Cotehele Quay and Calstock.

A typical Tamar vessel was a sailing barge, built on the open river bank, of up to 60 tons, with a peaked, gaff-rigged mainsail and a fore staysail. The Tamar was navigable by seagoing ships of up to 400 register tons as far inland as Weir Quay, near Bere Alston, where the estuary narrows into the tidal river, some 8.4 miles (13.5 km) upstream from Plymouth Sound. Vessels of 300 tons sailed as far inland as Morwellham, 17.2 miles (27.7 km) along the river from the sea. A further stretch of 1.8 miles (2.9 km) upstream to Weir Head, near Gunnislake, is accessible to smaller boats. Weir Head is just downstream of the weir at Gunnislake (the tidal limit) and is the final place to turn boats; it was from here that smaller craft could begin their journey on the Tamar Manure Canal.

=== Tamar Manure Navigation ===
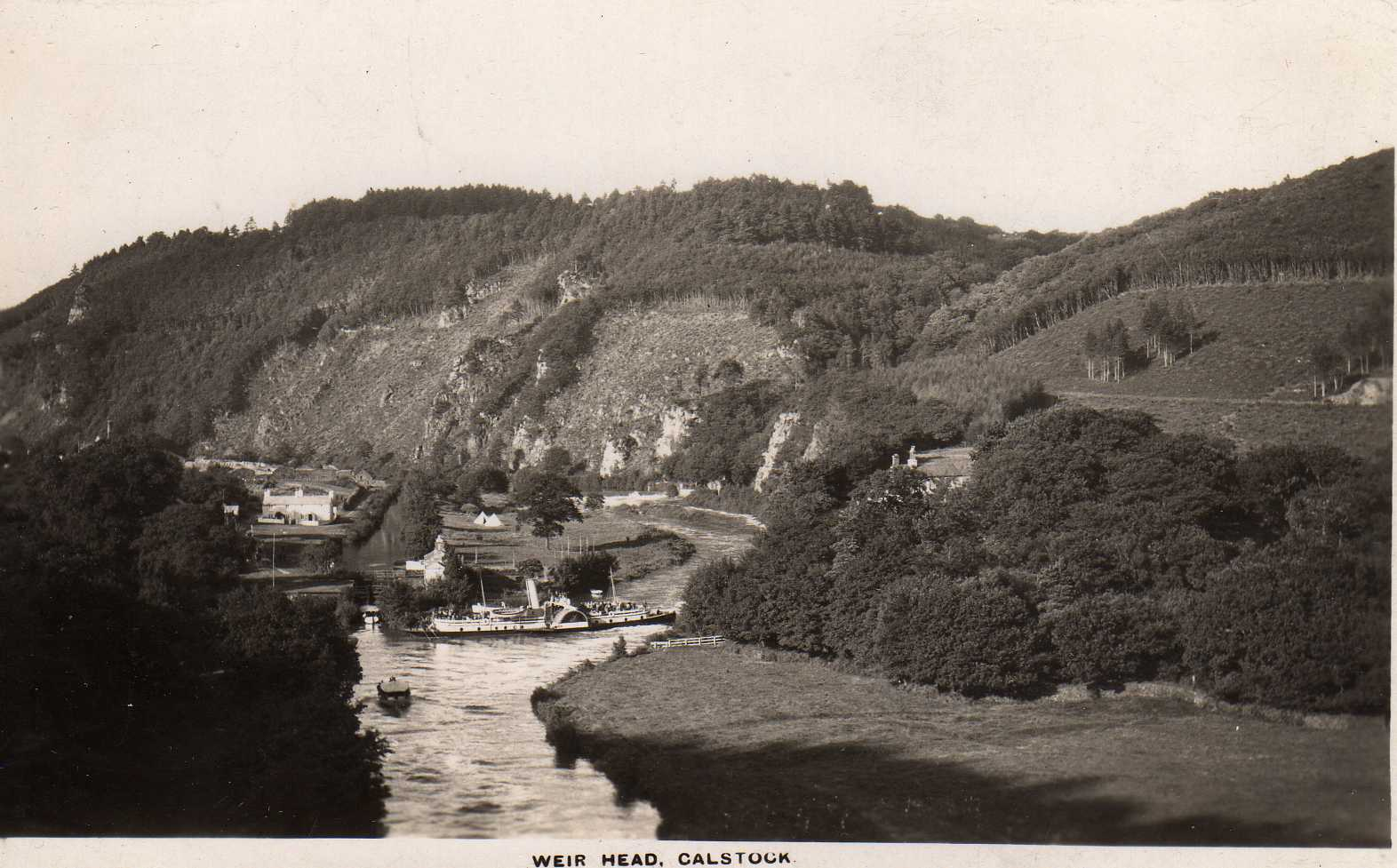
High tide at Weir Head — excursion steamer Alexandra, 127 gross register tons, 126 feet in length, reversing at the entrance to the Tamar Manure Canal, in 1906.

In 1794, the Tamar Manure Navigation Company was formed to extend navigation inland for a further 30 miles, to Tamerton Bridge in North Tamerton. An Act of Parliament of 1796 authorised the works, with the company empowered to improve and manage navigation on the Tamar from Morwellham Quay upstream to Boat Pool, at Blanchdown (just upstream of Gunnislake), and to construct a canal from there. The project however advanced no further than Gunnislake, with work ceasing in 1808. Barges of up to 30 tons could then proceed as far as Gunnislake New Bridge, bypassing the weir (above Weir Head) via a 500-yard canal to the west of the river. As the only completed work of the original project, this short canal became known as the Tamar Manure (Navigation) Canal. It had one lock allowing vessels to rise from the tidal Tamar to the water level above the weir. A salmon ladder bypassed the lock.

The navigable route along the Tamar and the Manure Canal that was managed by the company (from Morwellham Quay upstream to Blanchdown) was known as the Tamar Manure Navigation and was 3.0 miles (4.8 km) in length. The import of fertilizer (at the time of the construction of the canal all types of which were typically referred to as "manure") and coal and the export of bricks and granite along this short navigation proved profitable for many years. The navigation from Launceston to Tamerton was completed in 1826 as part of a separate project, the Bude Canal. The Tamar Manure Navigation ceased functioning in 1929 and the company was wound up in 1942.

== History ==
In 997, according to the Anglo-Saxon Chronicle, raiding Vikings travelled up the Tamar and then the Tavy river as far as Lydford, and burned Ordwulf's monastery at Tavistock.

During the English Civil War, Cornwall was entirely loyal to King Charles I and the Royalist cause. However, Devon was primarily Parliamentarian; thus the River Tamar became the site of many battles, such as the Battle of Gunnislake New Bridge on 20 July 1664. Each side of the Tamar understood that if they were either to invade or to defend themselves, they had to have control of the Tamar crossings.

In medieval times, the transport of goods to supply the Benedictine abbey at Tavistock, four miles by track from the river port of Morwellham, was significant. Sea sand from the coast was imported to spread on farmland, until in the 18th century a dressing of lime was found to be more beneficial. Large quantities of limestone and coal were then imported to burn in the numerous limekilns on the river quays; the lime had to be made locally as it was not slaked before application, and was too chemically reactive for transport by water after burning. Later, street sweepings and other refuse from Plymouth and Devonport, together with bones for the newly discovered bone fertiliser, were carried inland to manure the fields. Other regular imports were timber from British Columbia and the Baltic, in large baulks for use as pit props in the mines, and coal from Wales to supply the mine pumping engines.

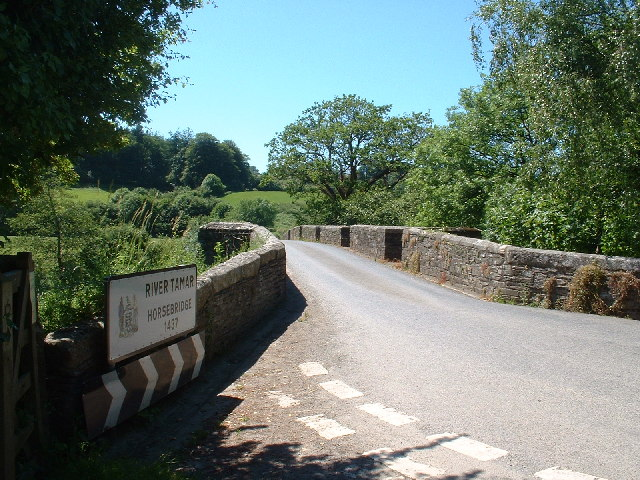
The Horsebridge, built in 1437, is still used by motor traffic.

Tavistock was one of the three stannary towns of Devon, and large quantities of refined tin ore were exported through Morwellham from the 12th century until 1838, when the requirement to pay duty on the metal at one of the specified towns was relaxed. The opening in 1817 of the Tavistock Canal, between Tavistock and Morwellham, facilitated traffic. Later, the East Cornwall Mineral Railway provided an outlet through the quays of Calstock from the Cornish side of the valley. Other significant cargoes exported were quarried granite, and later, copper, lead and manganese ores, with their important by-product of arsenic. Arsenic was extracted from mispickel, once regarded as a waste product but later offering an important source of revenue as copper and tin extraction declined in profitability. The refined product was exported worldwide, in particular to the southern United States, where it was used as an insecticide in the cotton fields.

In the 13th century, lead and silver output from the royal mines on the Bere peninsula (Note: Between the Tamar and the Tavy.) was significant, and production continued intermittently until the 19th century. The Johnson Matthey smelting works at Weir Quay extracted silver and lead not only from local ore, but also from ore imported by sea from Europe and from as far away as Newfoundland. Fluorspar from the lead mine tailings was exported to France for use in the manufacture of glassware.

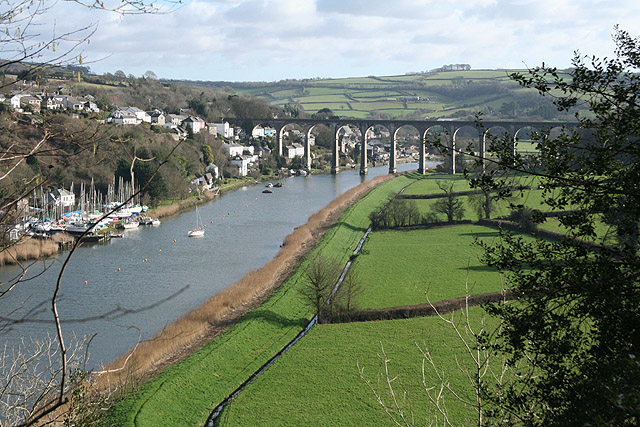
The Tamar Valley Line railway crosses the Tamar on a viaduct, built in 1907, at Calstock

The old ferry crossings developed into the busy river quays of the 18th and 19th centuries.

The development of the "Three Towns" (Plymouth, Devonport and Stonehouse) at the mouth of the river offered an important market for the valley's agricultural produce, needed in particular to serve the victualling requirements of the royal dockyard, and this was always carried by boat. In 1820 or 1821, the first paddle steamer on the Tamar inaugurated a service between Calstock and Devonport to deliver foodstuffs.

In 1859, a railway from Plymouth to London was opened and fresh produce could be landed at the Devonport steamer quays in the evening and be on sale in London by the next morning. The growing city population created a large demand for sightseeing cruises on the river; this was a significant source of traffic from 1823, with the launch of the Cornish steam packet Sir Francis Drake, until the outbreak of World War II.

Mineral traffic on the river diminished towards the end of the 19th century, after the Plymouth, Devonport and South Western Junction Railway reached Tavistock in 1859 (Note: It made the Tavistock Canal to Morwellham redundant for transport, although it remains in use as a source of hydropower.) and as the copper and tin mines became exhausted. The decline accelerated from 1894, when the East Cornwall Mineral Railway, until then linked to the outside world only through the port of Calstock, was extended to the Plymouth, Devonport and South Western Junction Railway at Bere Alston. Tourist and market traffic on the river, using purpose-built or converted steamers, remained substantial until the Devonport piers were closed and the ships requisitioned on the outbreak of war in 1939.

== Economy ==
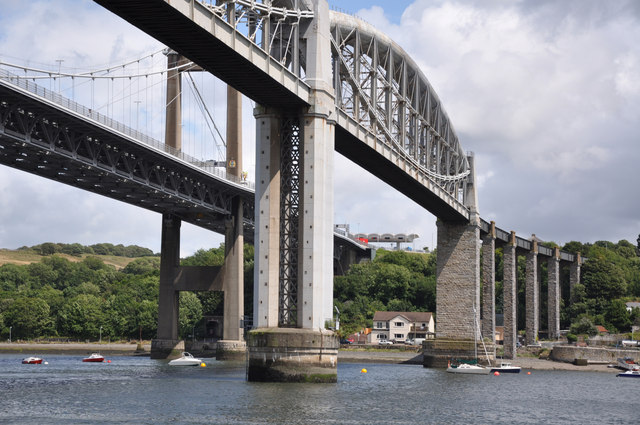
The Royal Albert Bridge and the Tamar Bridge at Saltash

Rocks around the edge of Dartmoor were mineralised by fluids driven by the heat of the Earth's core, which gave rise to ores containing tin, copper, tungsten, lead and other minerals in the valley. The medieval estate of Cotehele, owned by the Edgcumbe family, was a significant producer of silver for the Royal Mint.

During the industrial revolution, there was significant mining activity near the river, between Gunnislake and Weir Quay. During this period, the Tamar was an important river for shipping copper from ports such as Morwellham Quay, Calstock and New Quay (Devon) to south Wales where it would be smelted. The valley forms district A10i of the Cornwall and West Devon Mining Landscape. The river has long been famous for the quality of its salmon (Note: Noted by Daniel Defoe and Sir Richard Carew.) whilst the valley was known nationally for the high quality, and early, soft fruit and market gardens sheltered by its steeply winding slopes.

== Folklore ==
There was the speedy Tamar, which divides
The Cornish and the Devonish confines;
Through both whose borders swiftly downe it glides.
And, meeting Plim, to Plimmouth thence declines:
And Dart, nigh chockt with sands of tinny mines;

— From "Rivers of England" by Edmund Spenser

The Alliterative Morte Arthure states that the mortal combat of King Arthur and Mordred took place close to the banks of the river.

A traditional Cornish tale claims that the devil would never dare to cross the river Tamar into Cornwall for fear of ending up as a pasty filling. Though unusual landscape features are often named after the devil (e.g. devil's frying pan), it used to be said that the devil never came to Cornwall: he once reached Torpoint and immediately noticed that various kinds of pie were customary; he feared that devilly pie might be the next kind so returned to Devon. This legend is set to music in the traditional Cornish folk song Fish and Tin and Copper.

=== Legend of Tamara ===
The legend behind the name involves a nymph by the name of Tamara, who lived in the underworld. Tamara wanted to wander freely in the mortal world, against the advice of her parents. One day, wandering in Dartmoor, she happened to meet two giants called Tavy and Torridge (or Tawradge). Both giants became smitten with Tamara and vied for her affections. Tamara led the giants on a dance, but never let them touch her, instead darting out of reach whenever they came too close. Tamara's father, who had been out looking for her, located her just as the giants finally caught up with her near Morwenstow. He flew into a rage and used a spell to put Tavy and Tawradge into a deep sleep. This infuriated Tamara, who subsequently refused to return to the underworld with her father.

He became even more enraged and cast a spell on Tamara, turning her into a bubbling spring, which produced the Tamar river and flowed all the way to the sea. Tawradge awoke to find his beloved had become a river; in despair, he sought the advice of a magician, who turned him into a river (Note: The rivers Torridge and Taw.) so that he could hope to reunite with Tamara. Tawradge was never able to find and merge with his beloved Tamara, instead turning north toward Bideford and the Bristol Channel and is still said to mourn his love, the Tamar. This legend explains why the River Torridge, which rises only 500 metres from the Tamar, veers away from the Tamar and forms a huge arc, eventually flowing to the North Devon coast. The other giant, Tavy, also awoke in despair and sought the aid of his own father, also a powerful magician. His father turned Tavy into a river as well, and Tavy set off in search of the Tamar, eventually finding her and merging with her into a wide and beautiful estuary.

== See also ==
- List of rivers of England
- HMS Tamar, 6 RN vessels and a shore base have been named after the river
- Tamar Site, an area in Hong Kong named after the fourth HMS Tamar
- RM Tamar, a Royal Marines shore base.
