= Joan Rendell =

British historian and writer (1921–2010)

Joan Rendell MBE (1921 – 4 May 2010) was an English historian, writer (mainly on Cornish subjects), and phillumenist.

== Life ==
Rendell was born in Plymouth, Devon, in 1921. She was the daughter of Gervase Rendell, born 1879 in Eastry, Kent. For most of her life her home was at Werrington, Cornwall.

She was the author of more than 30 books, mainly on Cornish subjects. In September 1980 she was made a Bard of Gorsedh Kernow, taking the name Scryfer Weryn (Writer of Werrington). She was also an avid collector of matchbox covers and had an estimated collection of 300,000. Another interest was corn dolly making, on which she also wrote a book.

Rendell died in a fire at her bungalow in Yeolmbridge, near Launceston, Cornwall, on 4 May 2010.

== Awards ==
Rendell was awarded the MBE in 1958, for raising £100,000 in National Savings stamps. She went on to be national chairman of the National Savings Bank. In 1977 she was awarded the Queen's Silver Jubilee Medal.

== Publications (selected) ==
- Cornwall Strange but True
- Collecting Matchbox Labels
- The Story of the Bude Canal. Callington: Stannary Press, 1978
- Along the Bude Canal. Bodmin: Bossiney Books, 1979
- Around Bude and Stratton
- Cornwall's Historic Buildings
- The Book of Werrington: a pictorial celebration
- Lundy Island. St Teath: Bossiney Books
- North Cornwall in the Old Days
- Hawker Country. St Teath: Bossiney Books
- Around Launceston
- Country Crafts
- Saltash
- Cornish Churches. St Teath: Bossiney Books, 1982
- Gateway to Cornwall. St Teath: Bossiney Books
