= River Ottery =

River in northeast Cornwall, England

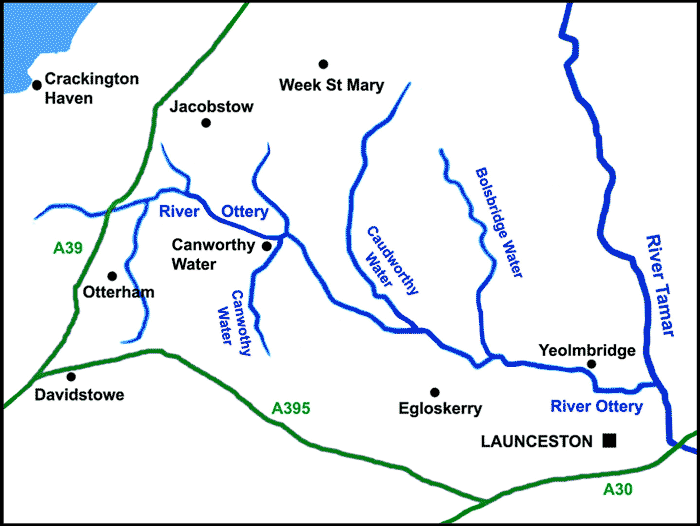
Sketch map of the River Ottery and tributaries (click to enlarge)

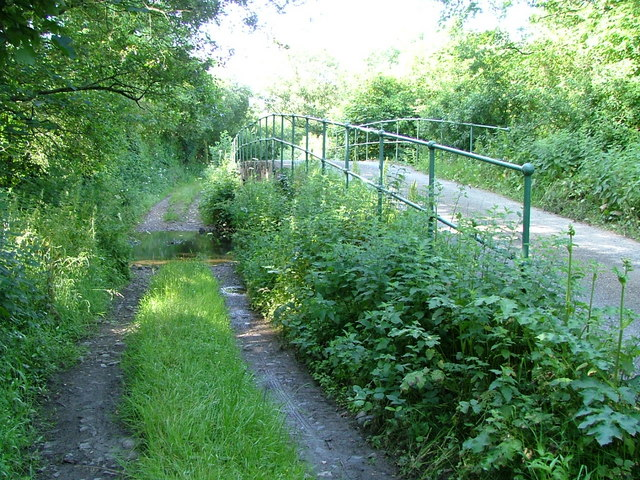
Ford and bridge at Trengune

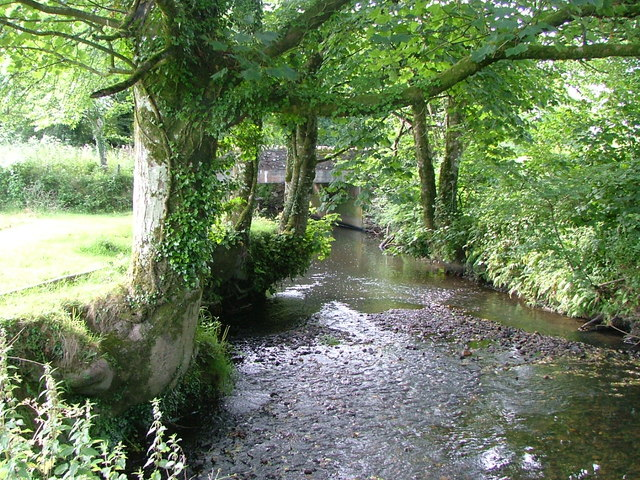
The River Ottery at Canworthy Water

The River Ottery (Cornish: Otri) is a small river in northeast Cornwall, England, United Kingdom. The river is about twenty miles (32 km) long from its source southeast of Otterham to its confluence with the River Tamar at Nether Bridge, two miles (3.2 km) northeast of Launceston.

The headwaters of the River Ottery are within the civil parish of Otterham but formerly came under the parish of Forrabury and Minster. In 1311, the rector of that parish wrote: "..the river Ottery takes its rise in this parish and flows to Canworthy Water and so by Yeolmbridge to the river Tamar."

== Hydrology and course ==
With its tributaries, the River Ottery forms a major sub-catchment of the Tamar system, draining 48 square miles (120 km^{2}) of north Cornwall. The Ottery's catchment area is within the Carboniferous geological formation known as the Culm Measures which stretches from Dartmoor to north Devon and across northeast Cornwall as far west as Bodmin Moor.

The infant river initially flows north until it reaches the hamlet of Trengune. From here it adopts an east-southeasterly course which it follows to its confluence with the River Tamar.

The largest tributaries to the River Ottery are Caudworthy Water and Bolsbridge Water which join the Ottery from the north and Canworthy Water which joins from the south.

The River Ottery system was severely affected by flooding in north Cornwall on 16 August 2004 when up to eight inches of rain fell during a single afternoon. The Ottery headwaters at Marshgate and Otterham were the most severely affected.

The river flows through an isolated area of mixed farming and the only riverside settlements of any size are Canworthy Water and Yeolmbridge.

== Wildlife and conservation ==
The Cornwall Rivers Project notes five Sites of Special Scientific Interest (SSSI) in the Ottery catchment including the Ottery Valley SSSI which has 33 hectares of increasingly threatened culm habitat and Kernick and Ottery Meadows SSSI, also noted for its biological interest.

The project's page also notes: "The Ottery supports a broad range of wildlife including populations of trout and migratory fish, otters, kingfishers, sand martins, dippers, curlews, snipe and the marsh fritillary butterfly."

== History ==
The majority of the boundary between Cornwall and Devon follows the River Tamar, and Celtic place-names, such as those including the element tre-, stop for the most part exactly at the Tamar, reflecting this ancient boundary. However, the part of Cornwall north of the River Ottery has few place-names including tre- and far more of Old English origin (such as those ending in -dun and -cot) than the rest of the county. This indicates that the river formed an early boundary between the rump of Dumnonia and the westward expansion of the Anglo-Saxon kingdom of Wessex.

== Location ==
- Source coordinates 50.67944°N 4.59460°W grid reference SX 166 900
- Trengune (change of course) coordinates 50.71032°N 4.56602°W grid reference SX 189 932
- Canworthy Water (settlement) coordinates 50.69744°N 4.51693°W grid reference SX 225 916
- Yeolmbridge (settlement) coordinates 50.66203°N 4.38123°W grid reference SX 317 874
- Confluence with River Tamar coordinates 50.65828°N 4.33969°W grid reference SX 346 869
