= Weir Quay =

Place in Devon, England

Coordinates: 50.464°N 4.209°W

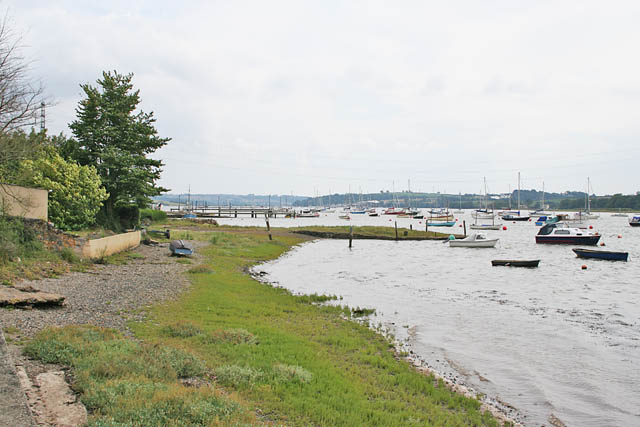
- Weir Quay

- Location within Devon
- OS grid reference: SX4365
- Civil parish: Bere Ferrers
- District: West Devon
- Shire county: Devon
- Region: South West
- Country: England
- Sovereign state: United Kingdom
- Post town: YELVERTON
- Postcode district: PL20
- Dialling code: 01822
- Police: Devon and Cornwall
- Fire: Devon and Somerset
- Ambulance: South Western
- UK Parliament: Torridge and Tavistock

Weir Quay is a place on the banks of the River Tamar in Devon, England. It lies 1 mile (1.6 km) south west of the village of Bere Alston.

Weir Quay is where the Tamar estuary narrows into the tidal river. The Tamar was navigable by seagoing ships of up to 400 register tons as far inland as here.
