= Canworthy Water =

Settlement in Cornwall, England

Coordinates: 50.69721°N 4.51632°W

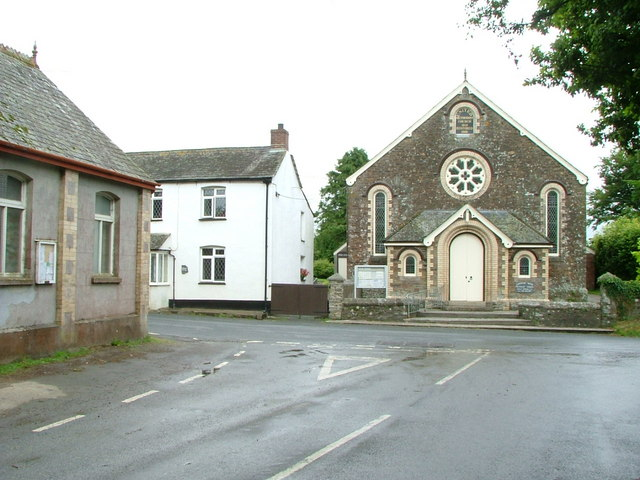
- Canworthy Water village centre

- Location within Cornwall
- Ceremonial county: Cornwall
- Region: South West
- Country: England
- Sovereign state: United Kingdom
- Police: Devon and Cornwall
- Fire: Cornwall
- Ambulance: South Western

Canworthy Water (Cornish: Boskarn) is a settlement in northeast Cornwall, England, United Kingdom. It is situated beside the River Ottery at OS grid ref SX224918 approximately seven miles (11 km) northeast of Camelford.

Canworthy Water is mainly in the civil parish of Warbstow (Detached), with parts north of the River Ottery in Jacobstow civil parish.

The original village of Canworthy (Cornish: Esk) is north of the river Ottery and the more modern, and subsequently larger village, Canworthy Water (Cornish: Dowr Karn) is located on the river.
