= Trengune =

Hamlet in Cornwall, England

Coordinates: 50.713°N 4.567°W

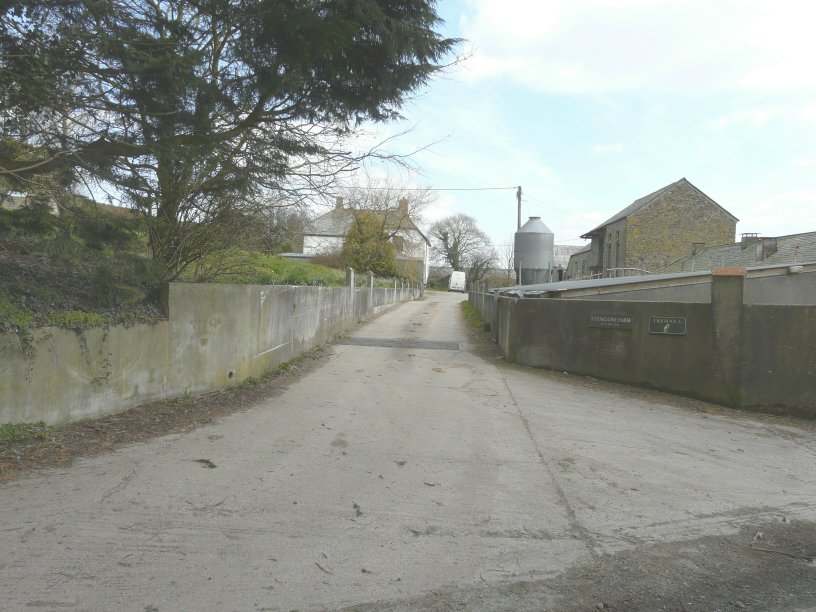
- Trengune Farm

- Location within Cornwall
- Civil parish: Warbstow
- Unitary authority: Cornwall
- Ceremonial county: Cornwall
- Region: South West
- Country: England
- Sovereign state: United Kingdom
- Police: Devon and Cornwall
- Fire: Cornwall
- Ambulance: South Western

Trengune is a hamlet in the civil parish of Warbstow, in Cornwall, England, United Kingdom. It is located 1.5 miles north and 1 mile west of the village of Warbstow, the River Ottery passes through Trengune. The earliest record of Trengune was in 1356; the meaning is "farm at the downs".

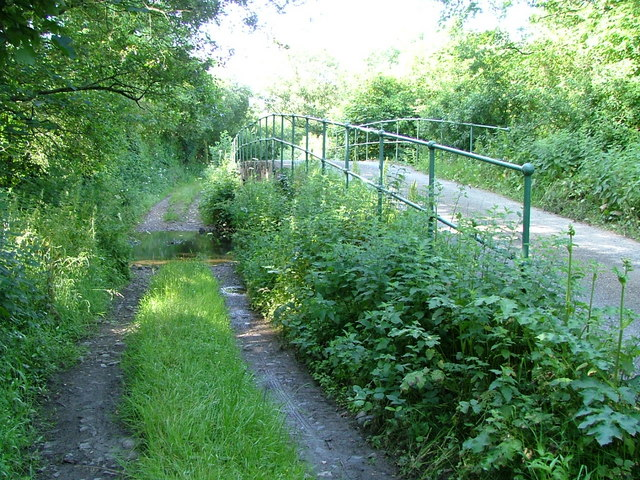
Ford and bridge at Trengune
