= Yeolmbridge =

Coordinates: 50.6620°N 4.3818°W

- Location within Cornwall
- OS grid reference: SX317874
- Civil parish: Werrington
- Unitary authority: Cornwall
- Ceremonial county: Cornwall
- Region: South West
- Country: England
- Sovereign state: United Kingdom
- Post town: LAUNCESTON
- Postcode district: PL15
- Dialling code: 01566
- Police: Devon and Cornwall
- Fire: Cornwall
- Ambulance: South Western
- UK Parliament: North Cornwall

Yeolmbridge is a village in Cornwall (but within the boundaries of the historic county of Devon), two and a half miles north of Launceston.

== Yeolm Bridge ==
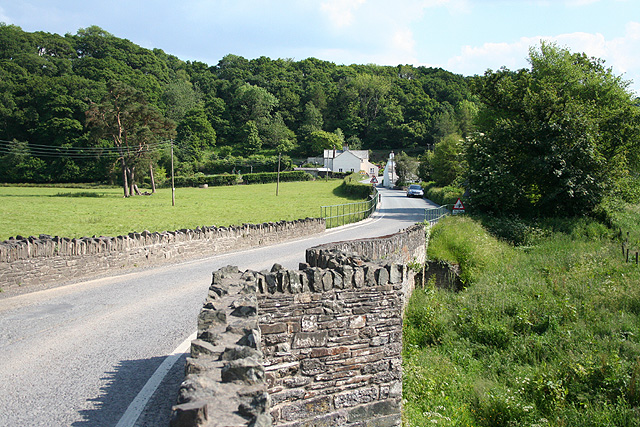
Yeolm Bridge

The village takes its name from the bridge, Yeolm Bridge which crosses the River Ottery and is Grade I listed and a Scheduled Ancient Monument. Built about 1350, it is considered the oldest surviving and best built of medieval Cornish bridges. In 1951 Nikolaus Pevsner described it as Cornwall's "most ambitious" bridge.

== Quarry ==
Yeolmbridge Quarry SSSI is 250 m to the east of the village. The quarry is designated a Site of Special Scientific Interest and a Geological Conservation Review (GCR) site, as the type–locality of the Yeolmbridge Formation; a black shale which shows the Devonian–Carboniferous boundary around 359 million years ago with a sequence of fossils.

== Notable people ==
- Joan Rendell, an English historian, writer and phillumenist, was resident at Yeolmbridge in the latter part of her life.
