= Fish and Tin and Copper =

Lyrics (Fish and Tin and Copper)

Old Nick, as he was wont to do
Was wand'ring up and down
To see what mischief he could brew,
And made for Launceston-town.

Chorus
For 'tis fish and tin and copper, boys,
And Tre and Pol and Pen,
And one and all we may rejoice
That we are Cornishmen.

Across the Tamar he had come,
Though you might think it strange,
And having left his Devon home
Tried Cornwall for a change.

Chorus

Now when to Launceston he grew near,
A-skipping o'er the sod,
He spied a rustic cottage there
With windows all abroad.

Chorus

And in the kitchen might be seen
A dame with knife in hand,
Who cut and slashed and chopped, I ween
To make a pasty grand.

Chorus

"Good Mornin', Missus, what is that?"
"Of all sorts, is a daub.
'Tis beef and mutton, pork and fat,
Potatoes, leeks, and squab."

Chorus

"A Cornish pasty, sure", says she,
"And if thou doesn't mind,
I soon shall start to cut up thee
And put ye in, you'll find!"

Chorus

In fear he turned and straight did flee
Across the Tamar green
And since that day in Cornwall
He has never more been seen!

Chorus

Fish and Tin and Copper is a traditional folk song/ballad associated with Cornwall, and dealing with the legend of the devil ("Old Nick") visiting Cornwall and being frightened away, fearing that he'd be made into a Cornish pasty filling.

It used to be said that the devil never came to Cornwall: he once reached Torpoint and immediately noticed that various kinds of pie were customary; he feared that devilly pie might be the next kind so returned to Devon.

The title comes from the three primary industries of Cornwall, Fish, Tin, and Copper. The reference to "Tre and Pol and Pen" comes from a famous reference to Tre Pol and Pen, "By Tre, Pol and Pen shall ye know all Cornishmen", a version of which was recorded by Richard Carew in his Survey of Cornwall, published in 1602. Many Cornish surnames and place names still retain these words as prefixes.

One famous version of the song was recorded by Brenda Wootton.

== Lowender Peran Dance ==
In March 1998, the Cornish Traditional Dance Competition held a selection for a new dance to celebrate 20 years of Lowender Peran. The winning dance, choreographed by Jenny White for the Bolingey Troyl Band and Dancers, was set to the song Fish and Tin and Copper. The group had originally performed it as a demonstration dance at the opening ceremony of Lowender Peran in 1997. The chorus of the song inspired the use of traditional steps and patterns to represent these Cornish industries, including steps from the Newlyn Fisherman's Reel, followed by a chain (swimming fish), then the turning of wheels and cogs of the mines.
