= Bere Ferrers =

Village in Devon, England

Coordinates: 50.451°N 4.177°W

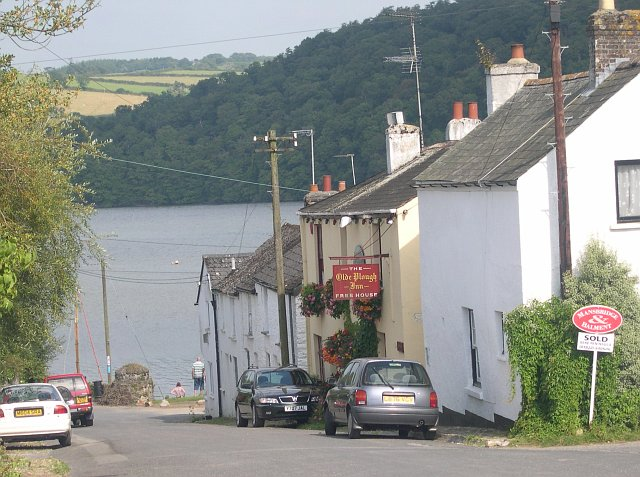
- Bere Ferrers leading down to the River Tavy

- Location within Devon
- Population: 2,989 (2011)
- OS grid reference: SX4563
- Civil parish: Bere Ferrers
- District: West Devon
- Shire county: Devon
- Region: South West
- Country: England
- Sovereign state: United Kingdom
- Post town: YELVERTON
- Postcode district: PL20
- Dialling code: 01822
- Police: Devon and Cornwall
- Fire: Devon and Somerset
- Ambulance: South Western
- UK Parliament: Torridge and Tavistock

Bere Ferrers, sometimes called Beerferris, is a village and civil parish on the Bere peninsula in West Devon in the English county of Devon. It is located to the north of Plymouth, on the west bank of the River Tavy. It has a railway station on the Tamar Valley Line.

The civil parish includes the whole of the Bere peninsula, including the village of Bere Alston and the smaller settlements of Tuckermarsh, Rumleigh, Buttspill, Braunder, Cotts, Hewton, Weir Quay, Clamoak, Gnatham and Collytown. In 2001 the parish had a population of 3,066; this had decreased to 2,989 in 2011.

== Sources ==
- Rogers, W.H. Hamilton, The Strife of the Roses and Days of the Tudors in the West, Exeter, 1890, pp. 1–36, Willoughby de Broke

== See also ==
- Bere Ferrers rail accident
- Exeter to Plymouth railway of the LSWR
