= North Tamerton =

Village and civil parish in east Cornwall, Britain

Coordinates: 50.751°N 4.394°W

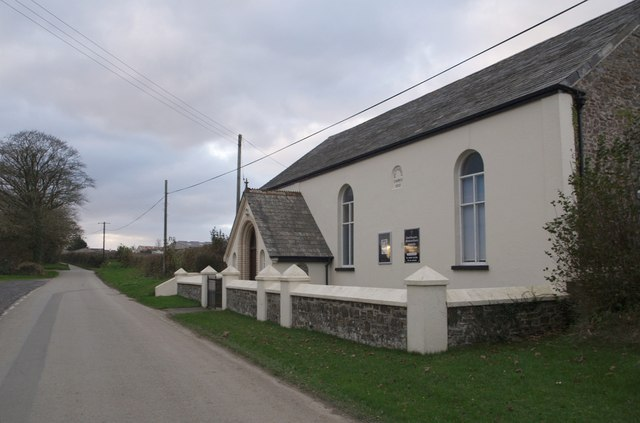
North Tamerton Methodist Church

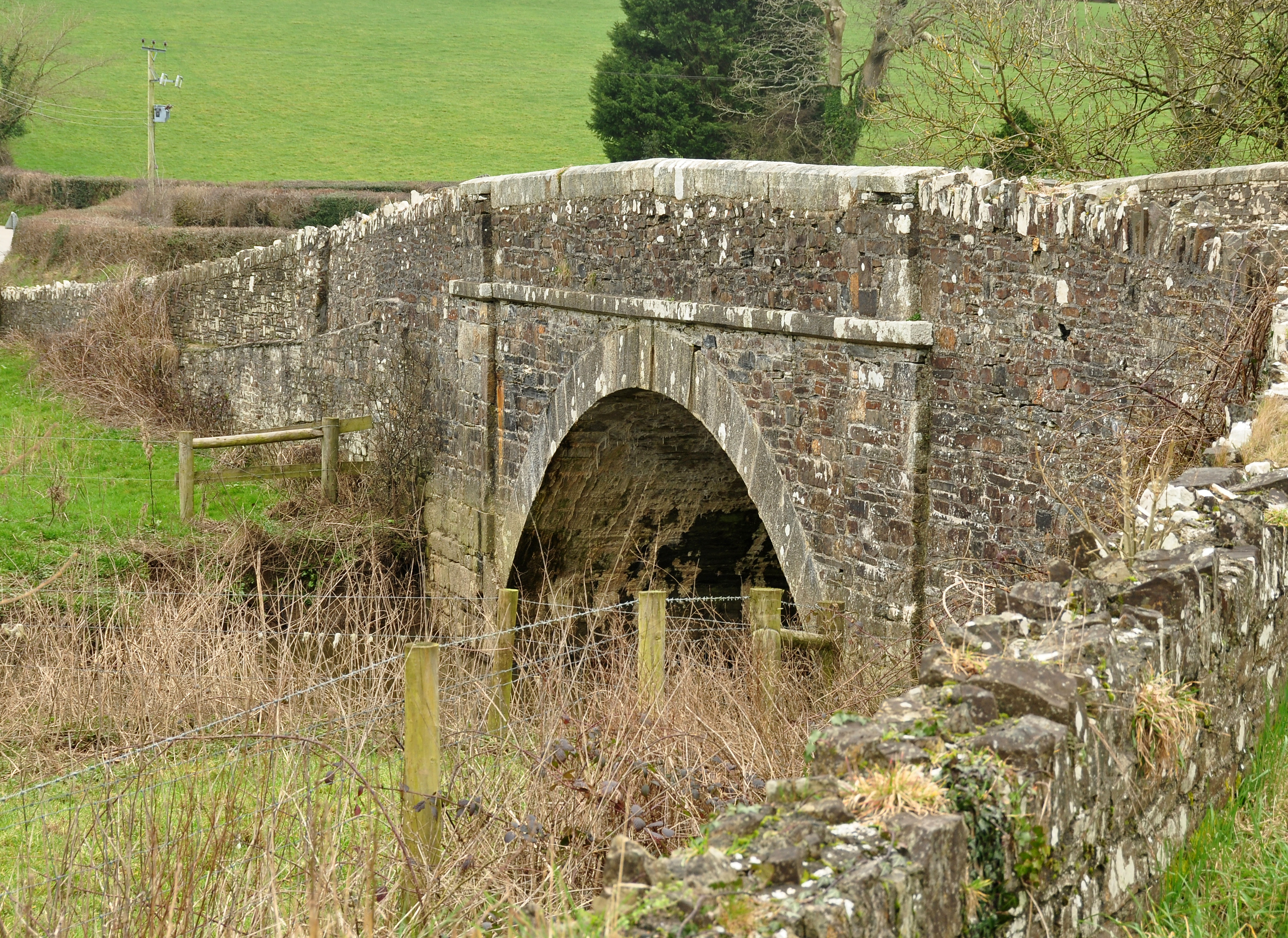
Tamerton Bridge

North Tamerton (Cornish: Tre war Damer) is a village and civil parish in east Cornwall, England, UK. The village is situated approximately eight miles (13 km) southeast of Bude and eight miles (13 km) north of Launceston.

== Geography ==
North Tamerton is a thinly populated rural parish and the only village is North Tamerton itself, the other settlements being farmsteads and hamlets. It came within the hundred, and later the registration district, of Stratton. It is bounded to the east by the River Tamar which for much of its length delineates Cornwall's border with Devon, but here Cornwall extends across the river making North Tamerton the only parish in Cornwall which includes land east of the Tamar.

The name Tamerton derives from 'estate on the Tamar'. To the west, the parish is bounded by the Cornish parishes of Whitstone and Week St Mary and population at the 2001 census was 288, increasing to 356 at the 2011 census. The village of North Tamerton on high ground above the confluence of the River Tamar and its tributary the River Deer.

The Bude Canal ran through the parish and there was a canal wharf at North Tamerton. The canal was unusual in using six inclined planes instead of locks to climb from sea level to its maximum altitude of 433 feet (132 m): one of the six inclines was south of Tamerton wharf.

== Parish Church ==
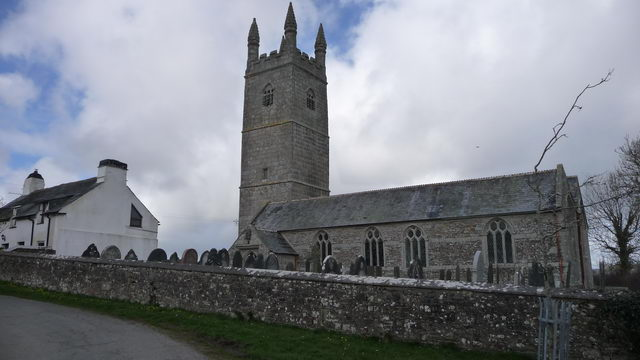
North Tamerton church

The 15th century church is dedicated to St Denis and is located at grid reference SX 311 973. The church has a chancel, nave, south aisle and a granite ashlar battlemented tower 70 feet (21 m) in height. The belfry houses a ring of six bells, and a local tradition says that the treble bell came from Tetcott church, across the River Tamar, and John Taylor the bell-founder having recast North Tamerton's ring of five in the early 19th century sold the treble to Tetcott so that the parishioners at North Tamerton could hear it across the valley and decide to acquire it.
