= Upper Tamar Lake =

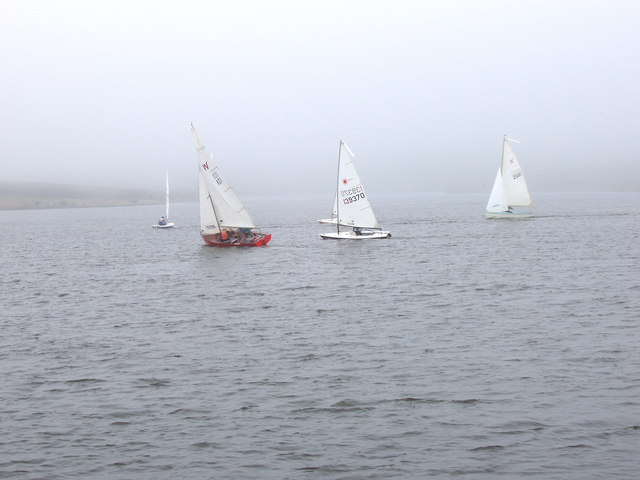
- Sailing on the lake.

- Location within Cornwall
- Location: England, United Kingdom
- Coordinates: 50.884°N 4.439°W
- Type: reservoir

Upper Tamar lake is a reservoir on the border of Cornwall and Devon in south-west England. It is owned by South West Water and managed by the South West Lakes Trust. The reservoir serves the water supply in the Bude area of Cornwall and surrounding districts, including Clovelly, Bradworthy and Warbstow.

To the south (downstream on the River Tamar) is the older Lower Tamar Lake. The county boundary follows the line of the river as it was prior to the construction of the reservoir, therefore now within the lake, resulting in it being in both Devon and Cornwall.

== History ==
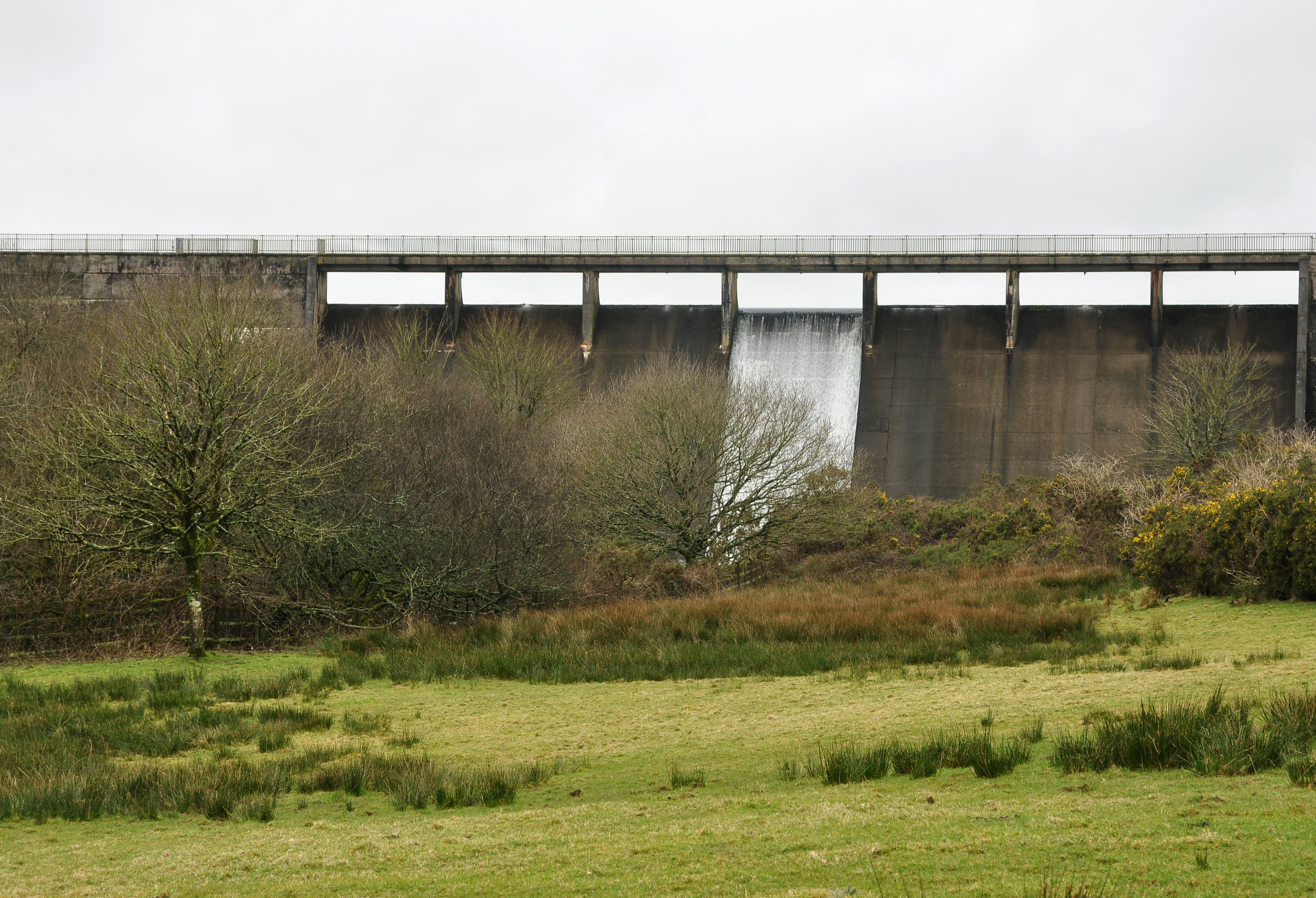
The gravity dam used to form the lake

The lake was planned as an expansion of the local water supply, and to avoid a potential drought in the area. Work on the lake began in May 1973 by W. C. French (Construction) Ltd. It was constructed by placing a concrete gravity dam across the edge of the lake to retain water. Work was mostly complete by 1975, and it was officially opened in October 1977. It is about 80 acres (32 ha) in area with a capacity of around 300 million gallons (1,400 million litres).

== Leisure ==
The lake is a popular place for water sports, including sailing, windsurfing and kayaking. There is a visitors centre near the lake, with camping facilities. The Upper Tamar Sailing Club (UTLSC) is a group of regular sailors on the lake. It is a popular coarse fishing lake, with carp being a popular catch. The lake is an area of special protection from birds under the Protection of Birds Acts 1954.

The lake hosts the Tamar Lakes Parkrun.

The nearest bus station to the lakes is at Kilkhampton, 3 miles away.
