= Lower Tamar Lake =

- Location within England
- Location: England
- Coordinates: 50.873°N 4.425°W
- Type: reservoir

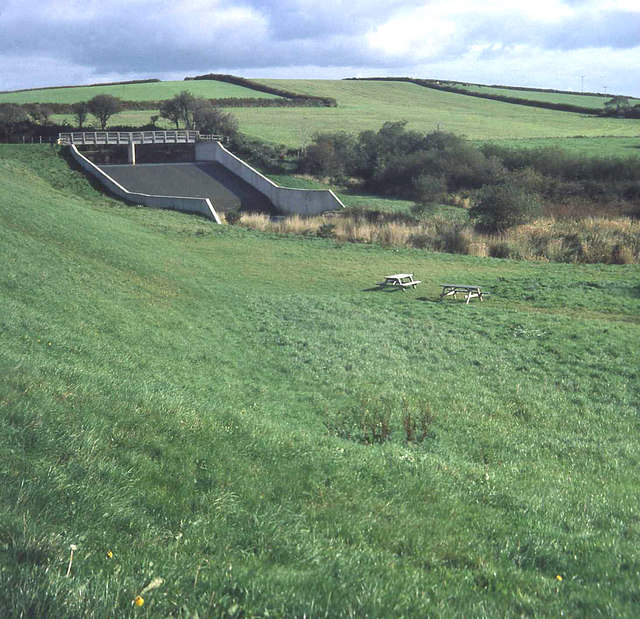
The spillway (in 1985).

Lower Tamar Lake is a 35 acre reservoir located on the Devon-Cornwall border, in England, near Thurdon.

It was constructed in the 1820s to supply water to the Bude Canal. It is now a nature reserve. It is also a popular fishing lake.

The reservoir has been formed by damming the River Tamar. To the north (upstream) is the newer Upper Tamar Lake, a reservoir used for public water supply.

The county boundary originally ran along the (natural) route of the River Tamar, but was re-aligned along a (now disused) re-routing of the river to the reservoir's west side, placing the lake in Devon.

There are several short walks at the lake, such as the aqueduct trail. This is a path following the canal that reaches a small building showing the history of the lake. Another walk that can be taken is towards upper lake. this route is also popular for cyclists.
