= Bude Canal =

Canal in Cornwall, England

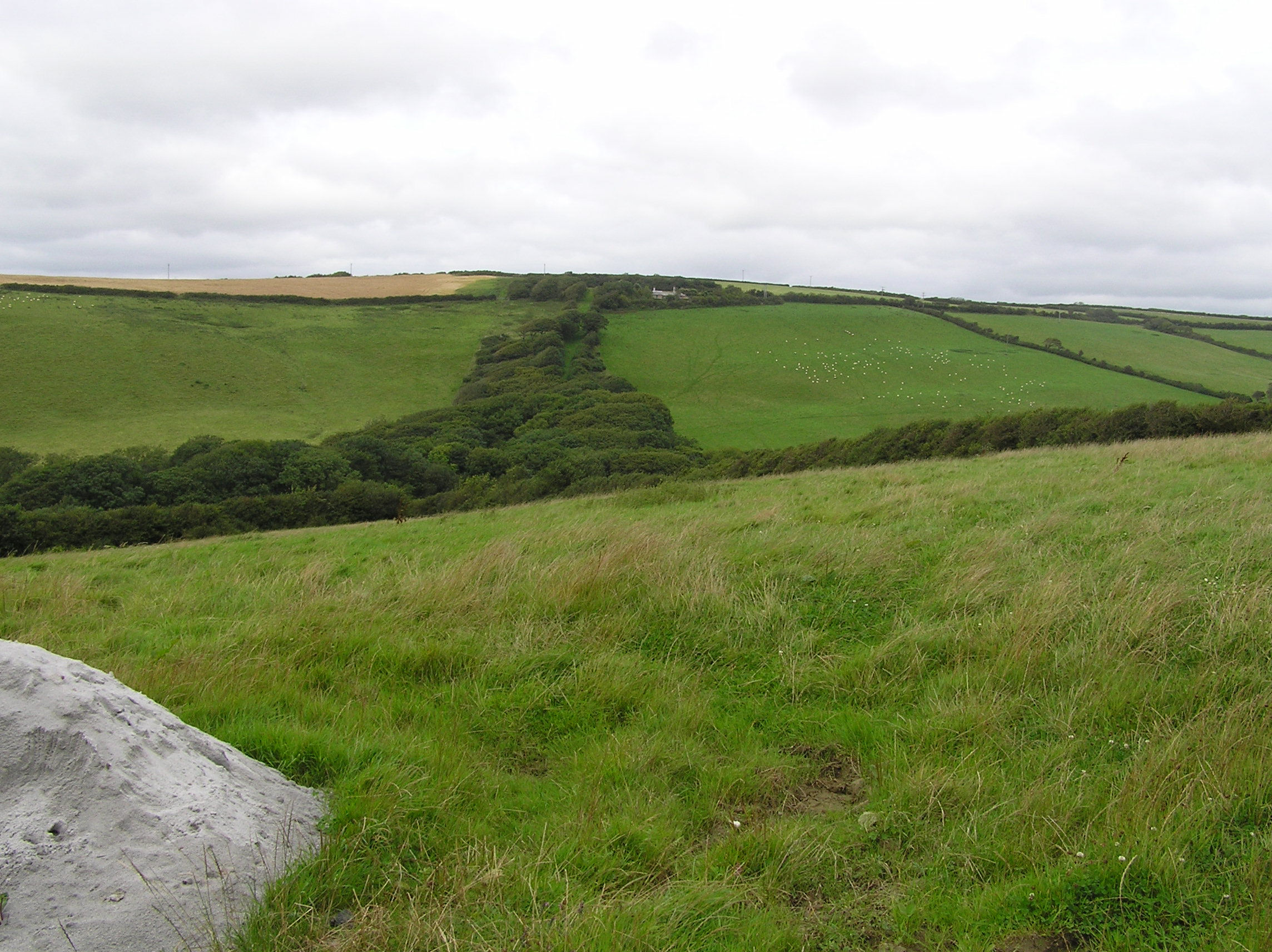
- The course of Hobbacott Incline in 2007; it ascends the hillside, marked by the twin rows of trees
- Interactive map of Bude Canal

Specifications
- Maximum boat length: 20 ft 0 in (6.096 m)
- Maximum boat beam: 5 ft 6 in (1.68 m)
- Locks: 2
- Number of lifts: 6 inclines
- Status: part extant

History
- Principal engineer: James Green (1781-1849), Thomas Shearm
- Date of act: 1819
- Date completed: 1823
- Date closed: 1891

Geography
- Start point: Bude
- End point: Vinworthy (N), Blagdon (E) and Druxton (S)

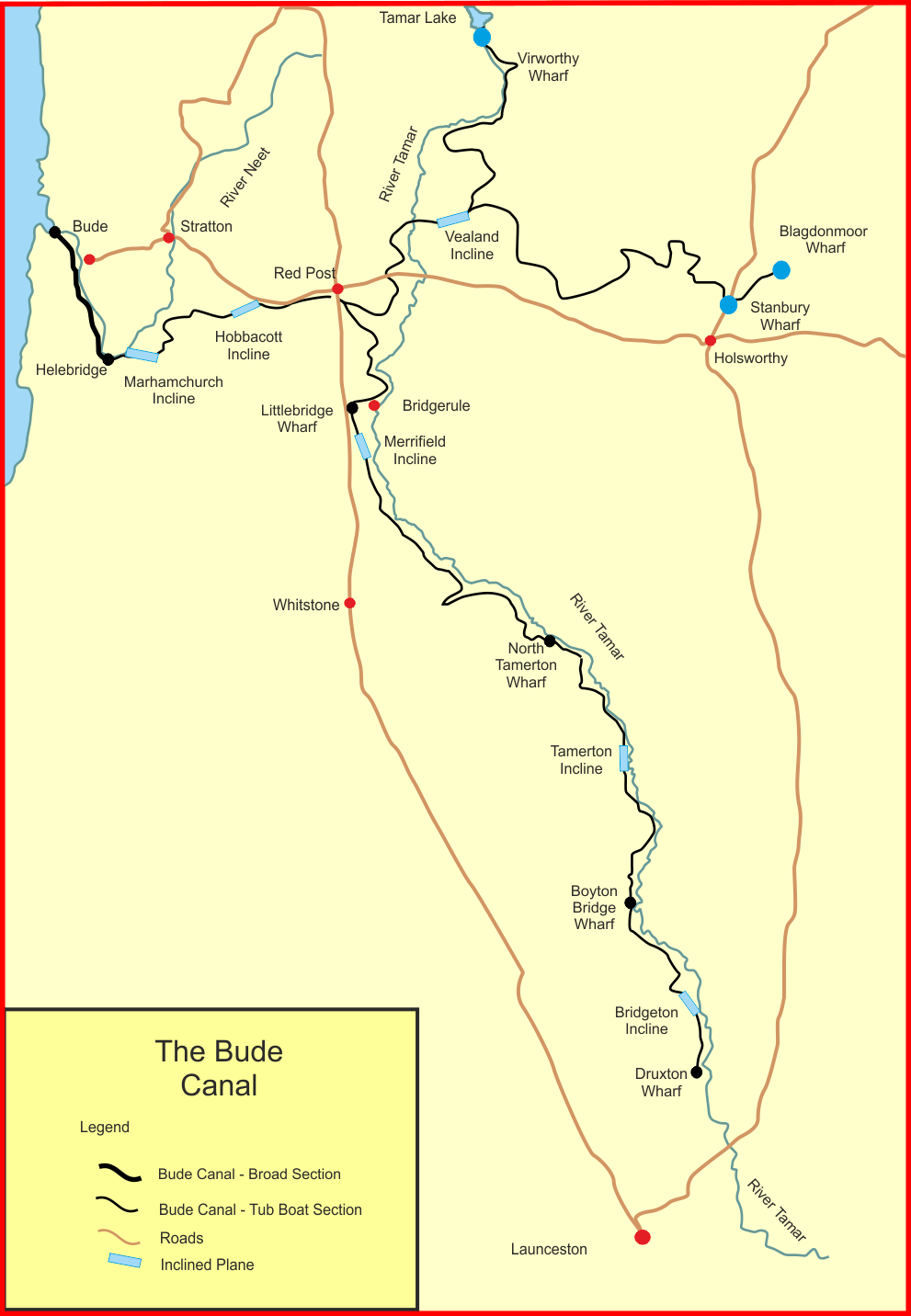
System map of the Bude Canal

The Bude Canal was a canal built to serve the hilly hinterland in the Cornwall and Devon border territory in the United Kingdom, chiefly to bring lime-bearing sand for agricultural fertiliser. The Bude Canal system was one of the most unusual in Britain.

It was remarkable in using inclined planes to haul tub boats on wheels to the upper levels. There were only two conventional locks, in the short broad canal section near the sea at Bude itself. It had a total extent of 35 miles (56 km), and it rose from sea level to an altitude of 433 feet (132 m).

The design of the canal influenced the design of the Rolle Canal.

== Origins ==
The coastal area at Bude has sand unusually rich in minerals, and the poor agricultural land of the locality was found to benefit considerably from application of the sand. In the pre-industrial age, actually transporting it was difficult, even to land relatively close to the coast.

Bude Canal Act 1774
- Act of Parliament
- Parliament of Great Britain
- Long title: An Act for making a navigable Cut or Canal from the Port or Harbour of Bude, in the Hundred of Stratton, in the County of Cornwall, to the River Tamer, in the Parish of Calstoke, in the said County.
- Citation: 14 Geo. 3. c. 53
- Territorial extent: Great Britain

Dates
- Royal assent: 20 May 1774
- Commencement: 13 January 1774 (Note: Start of session.)

Status: Current legislation

Text of statute as originally enacted

Several schemes were put forward for canals to bring the sand to the countryside, and these proposals did not lack ambition. One early scheme, conceived by Cornish engineer John Edyvean, aimed at distributing Welsh coal from the port as far inland as Calstock on the River Tamar. It gained approval for construction in the Bude Canal Act 1774 (14 Geo. 3. c. 53), but financial problems and the Napoleonic Wars frustrated the proposal.

Bude Harbour and Canal Act 1819
- Act of Parliament
- Parliament of the United Kingdom
- Long title: An Act for improving the Harbour of Bude, in the County of Cornwall; and for making and maintaining a Navigable Canal from the said Harbour of Bude to or near the Village of Thornbury, in the County of Devon, and divers Branches therefrom, all in the said Counties of Cornwall and Devon.
- Citation: 59 Geo. 3. c. lv
- Territorial extent: United Kingdom

Dates
- Royal assent: 14 June 1819
- Commencement: 14 June 1819 (Note: The Acts of Parliament (Commencement) Act 1793.)

Status: Current legislation

Text of statute as originally enacted

In 1818, the West Country canal engineer James Green produced a report for canal's backers, and an act of Parliament, the Bude Harbour and Canal Act 1819 (59 Geo. 3. c. lv), was obtained for this more moderate proposal in 1819. After some difficulties in the construction phase, the canal was completed, and opened on 8 July 1823. Its cost was £118,000.

== The canal system ==
The project:

- improved the difficult exposed sea harbour at Bude;
- built a broad canal capable of taking 50-foot (15 m) barges for 2 miles (3.2 km) to Helebridge Basin;
- built the rest of the system for tub boats, 20 feet (6.1 m) long by 5 feet 6 inches (1.68 m) wide;
- built a reservoir at Virworthy to feed water to the system.

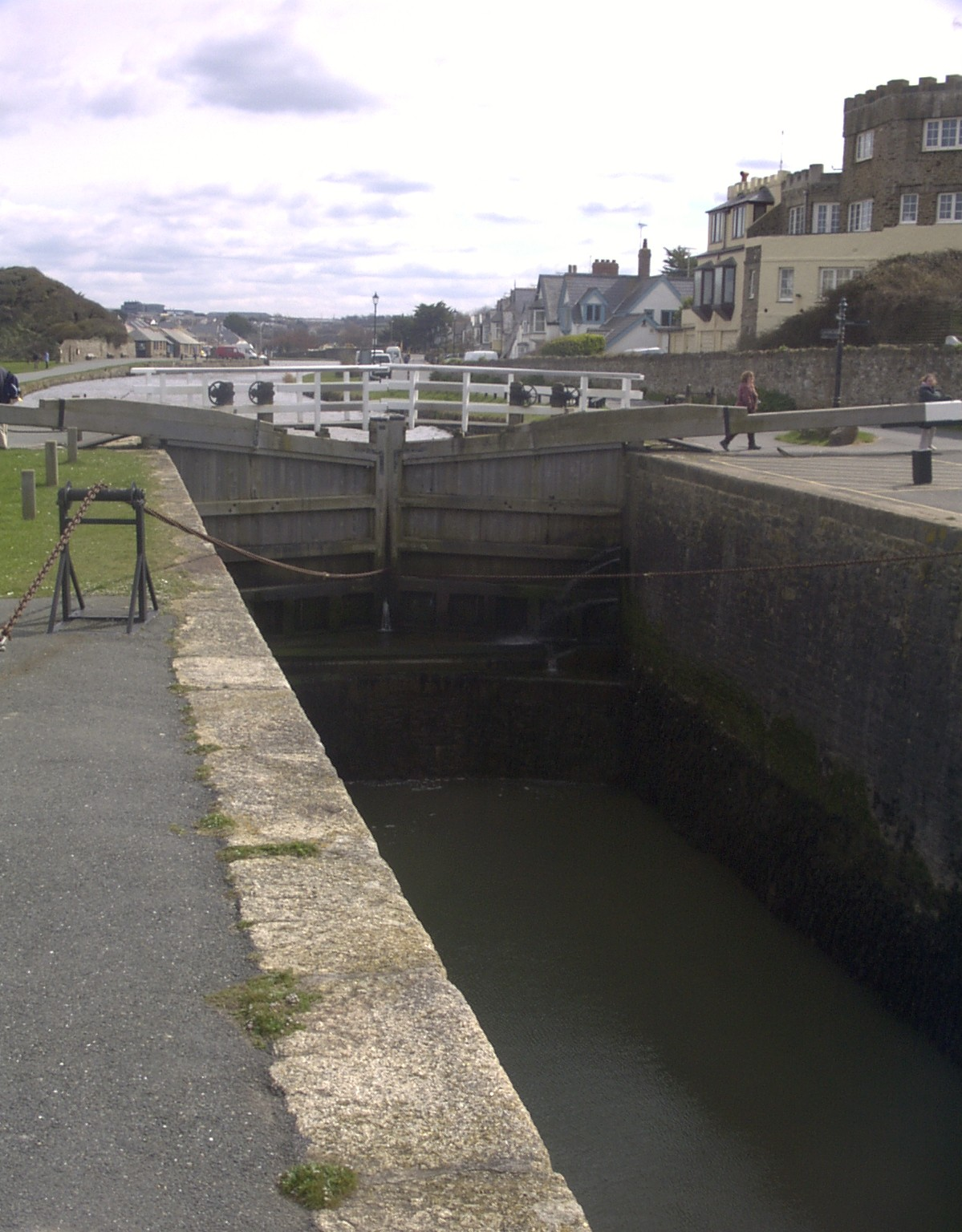
The sea lock on Bude Canal

The main line of the canal ran south east from Bude to Druxton Wharf near Launceston, with an easterly branch to Blagdonmoor, beyond Holsworthy. There was a northerly feeder arm leading from a new reservoir at Virworthy, now called Lower Tamar Lake.

There were two conventional locks in the short broad canal section, each with a vertical interval of 5 feet 6 inches (1.68 m). This section terminated at Helebridge, about 2 miles (3.2 km) from Bude, and ordinary coastal barges travelled this far up the canal.

The tub boats were designed to use the main part of the system, and they generally made the transit from the harbour at Bude, or from Helebridge if trans-shipping from coastal vessels there.

After Helebridge, there were three inclined planes to the summit section; the whole of the central part of the system was at this level, 433 feet (132 m) above sea level. The main line to Druxton Wharf, near Launceston, negotiated three descending inclined planes as it followed the southerly course of the River Tamar.

With no intermediate locks on the tub boat sections, the canal had to follow the contours between the inclined planes, and this made its route even more circuitous than most canals. However, some relatively ambitious viaducts and earthworks were constructed, particularly where side streams and small valleys entered the main watercourse and its valley.

== The inclined planes ==
The unusual feature of the canal was the six inclined planes. The tub boats had wheels, and on the inclined planes they were pulled up the slopes with the wheels running in channel rails (like a squat letter "U" in section). There were two sets of rails, one for each direction, but it does not appear that a counterbalancing system was used (in which a boat coming down would balance one being pulled up).

The tub boats were hauled up and let down the inclined planes by chains, which were operated in most cases by waterwheels; the transit took five minutes or so. There were standby steam engines at some of the inclined planes. However the Hobbacott Inclined Plane (both the steepest and that allowing the greatest height difference) used a different system of harnessing water power: water filled a very large bucket, and it was simply the weight of the water that pulled the ascending tub boat up the incline. The bucket operated in a deep vertical shaft, and at the bottom a plug was opened and the water ran to waste along an adit which connected to the lower level of the canal; the descending bucket pulled an empty bucket up in the same operation. The full bucket had to be heavy enough to pull a loaded tub boat up the 1 in 4 1/2 gradient as well as overcoming friction, and Green calculated that a weight of about fifteen tons was necessary. This was successful, and the bucket raised a boat up the plane in about four minutes, which was about one half of the time taken when the 16 horsepower (12 kW) standby steam engine was used.

The Inclined Planes
Name	Vertical interval	Length	System	Coordinates
Marhamchurch	120 ft	836 ft	Overshot waterwheel	50°48′20″N 4°31′40″W
Hobbacott	225 ft	935 ft	Descending bucket	50°48′56″N 4°29′43″W
Vealand	58 ft	500 ft	Overshot waterwheel	50°50′03″N 4°26′13″W
Merrifield	60 ft	360 ft	Overshot waterwheel	50°47′20″N 4°27′15″W
Tamerton	59 ft	360 ft	Overshot waterwheel	50°44′10″N 4°22′32″W
Bridgetown	51 ft	259 ft	Overshot waterwheel	50°41′23″N 4°21′11″W

The gradients of the planes differed somewhat, with Hobbacott being the steepest at 1 in 4.5 and Vealand being the gentlest at 1 in 8.6.

== Tub boats ==
The tub boats were 20 feet (6.1 m) long and 5 feet 6 inches (1.68 m) wide, and carried about 20 tons payload; the usage of tub boats was not confined to the Bude Canal. They were commonly operated by coupling between 4 and 6 together and hauling them – by horse power – together. A "train" of boats could therefore be 120 feet (37 m) long, and on the very sinuous alignment of the canal, the train must have been difficult to pass round sharp curves. Steering was possible by manually altering the connection between adjacent boats, using handspikes.

Each boat had four wheels 14 inches (360 mm) in diameter for running on the inclined planes; the boats were hauled up and down individually.

The operation of lining the tub boats up with the rails, at transfer from canal to plane, must have been difficult. Once engaged with the continuous chain, it would have been impracticable to stop the motion momentarily while the wheels were guided to the rail channels; but no record is available as to how this was achieved.

== Operation ==
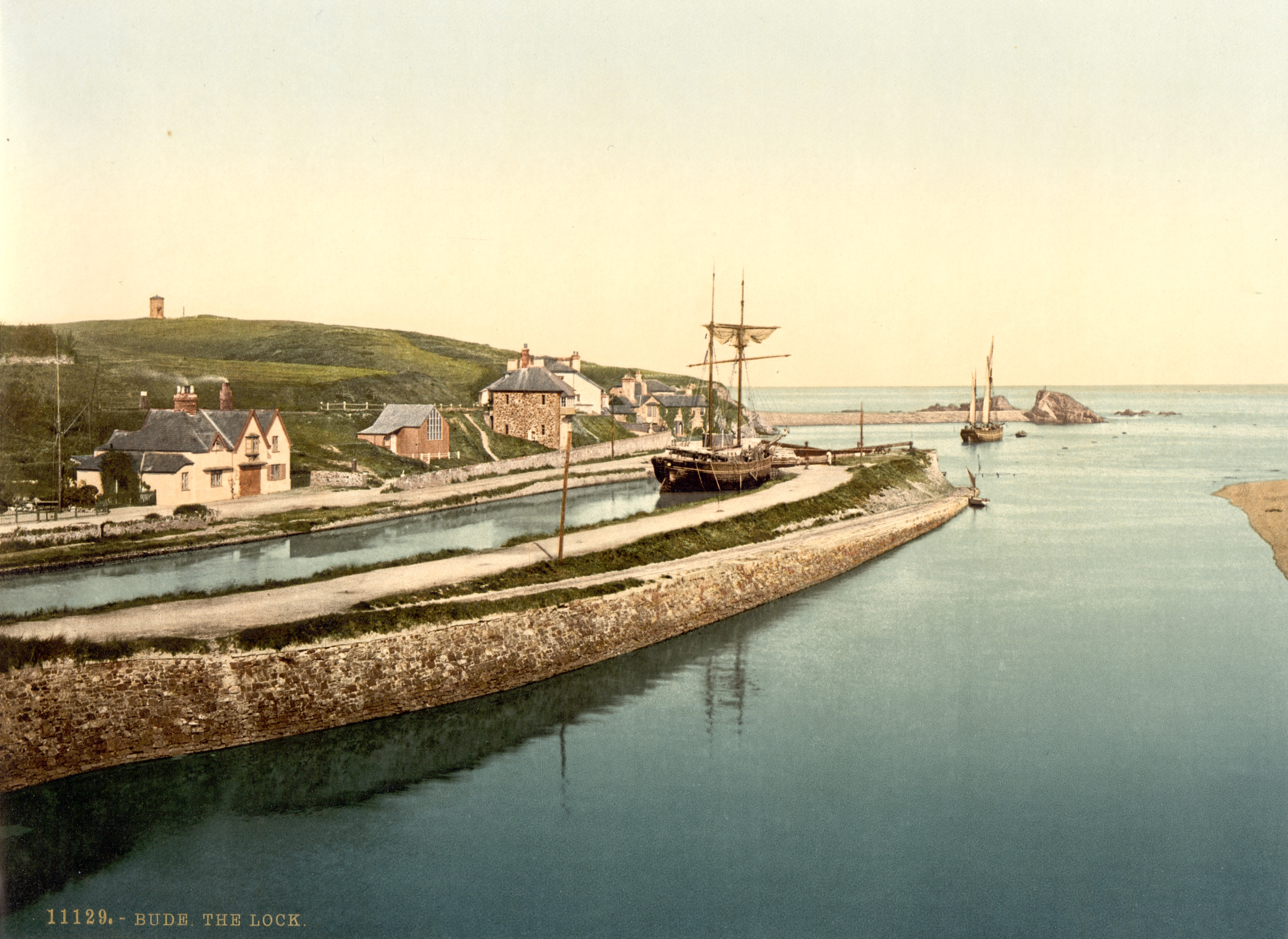
The sea lock at the end of the 19th century

On completion of the canal, the owning company was constantly short of cash, and inevitably income did not reach the levels predicted at the stage of promoting the canal. In addition, serious problems with the state of the newly finished works were discovered, although in the circumstances of a locally promoted scheme with novel technological aspects, the canal as built was better engineered than it might have been. The chains on the inclined planes were constantly breaking, the rails broke, and other mechanical failures were frequent, and physical damage from careless boat handling was also common.

However, the rich sand was successfully carried to farms near the various wharves in large quantities, and other merchandise was also carried, particularly coal from South Wales. Traffic picked up in the 1880s, and when the London and South Western Railway reached Holsworthy, the canal carried significant volumes of the sand to Stanbury Wharf for onward conveyance by railway; the mile or so between the wharf and the railway station must have been negotiated by horse and cart.

Nonetheless, the arrival of the railway soon spelt the ultimate doom of the canal: manufactured fertilisers had become commonplace and cheap, and they could be brought in by railway, so that the demand for the local sand was diminished considerably.

When it became obvious that the canal could not survive, some directors proposed obtaining parliamentary authority for abandonment, or selling the canal outright to the railway company, or anyone else. However, legal conditions agreed at the time of construction gave certain landowners rights to take water from the canal, and they would not give up these rights without compensation, so for the time being the proposals for disposal were frustrated. Finally, abandonment of the tub boat operation took place on 14 November 1891, with the Launceston main line and the Holsworthy branch being abandoned, but the Feeder arm continuing to be kept open because of the water rights. After protracted negotiations, the remainder of the canal was bought by Stratton and Bude Urban District Council, on 1 January 1902, and this enabled them to supply domestic water in due course to the villages in the district from the canal's Tamar reservoir. The works became the responsibility of North Cornwall District Council when English local government was reorganised in 1974.

== The canal today ==
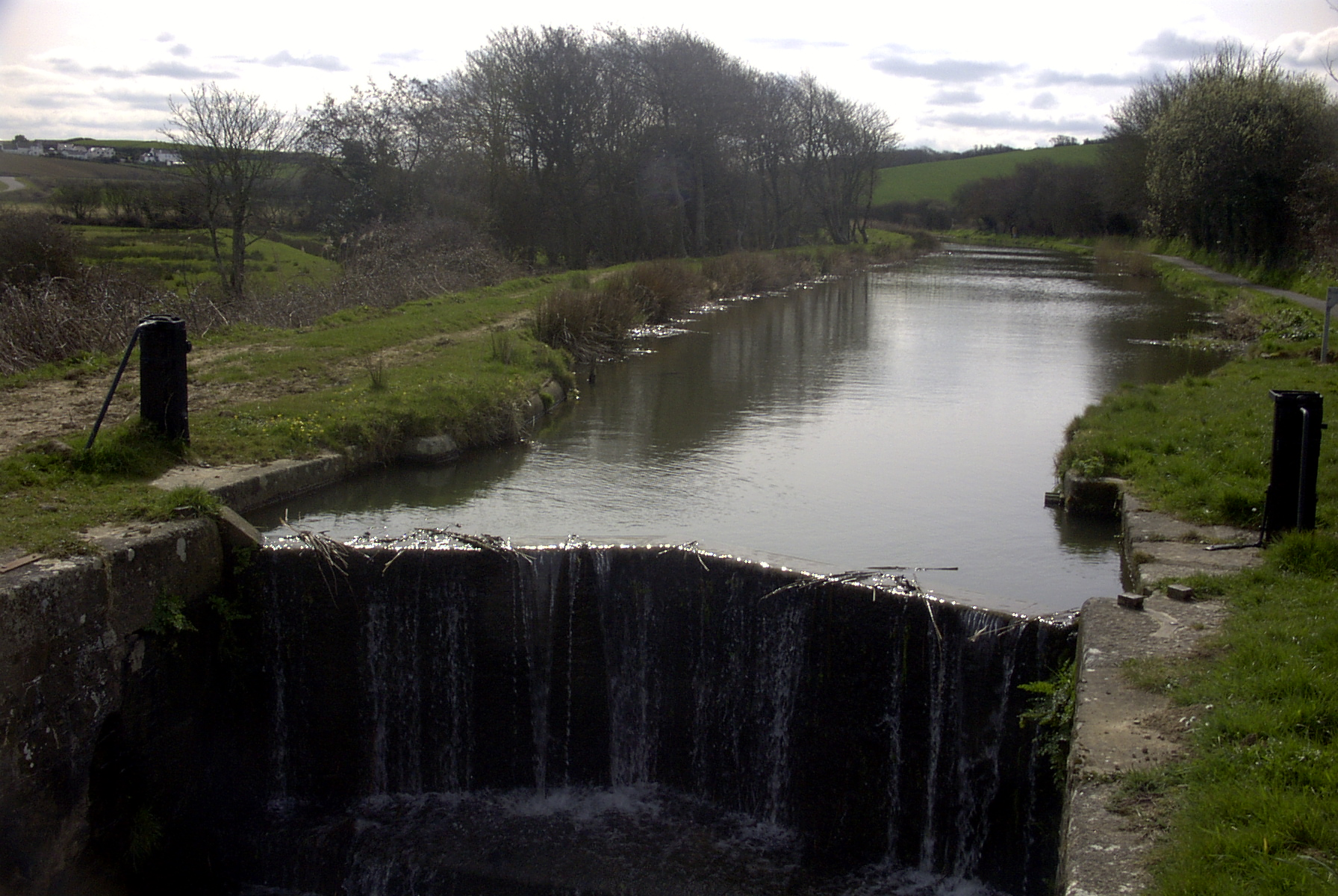
One of the two locks on Bude Canal where the gates have been replaced by a concrete dam. Both sets of locks going up the canal from Bude to Marhamchurch have been restored to wooden locks.

Today the sea lock is still in working order, and the canal is 'in water' as far as the base of the first inclined plane. The sea lock, though, is the only lock on this section still in working order, so that navigation is not possible along the whole network. Much of the upper section has been ploughed over or has become overgrown, but it is possible to see many remaining signs of the canal's presence, in bridges and wharf buildings. On the feeder branch and on the lower part of the Launceston main line, the alignment is indicated on current Ordnance Survey maps. In most cases, the alignment is not open to the public, however.

An exhaustive list of locations where the canal's remains can be seen may be found in Harris and Ellis.

== Plans for restoration ==
In 2005 major plans were approved to re-develop the canal, including renewal of the two locks between the sea lock and the first inclined plane. £3.8 million in funding for this project was provided by the Heritage Lottery Fund, Objective One and the South West Regional Development Agency. Most of the planned projects were completed by 31 March 2009, which was also the date on which North Cornwall District Council ceased to exist: the partners in the project expressed the hope that the new Unitary Authority would complete the three unfinished elements: raising Rodd's bridge, providing slipways at each end of the canal, and re-connecting it to Helebridge Wharf.

One element of the restoration was a number of wooden sculptures by Daniel Sodhi-Miles. These are inscribed with Cornish words and phrases, and take the form of chains or parts of chains, recalling the canal's boating history.

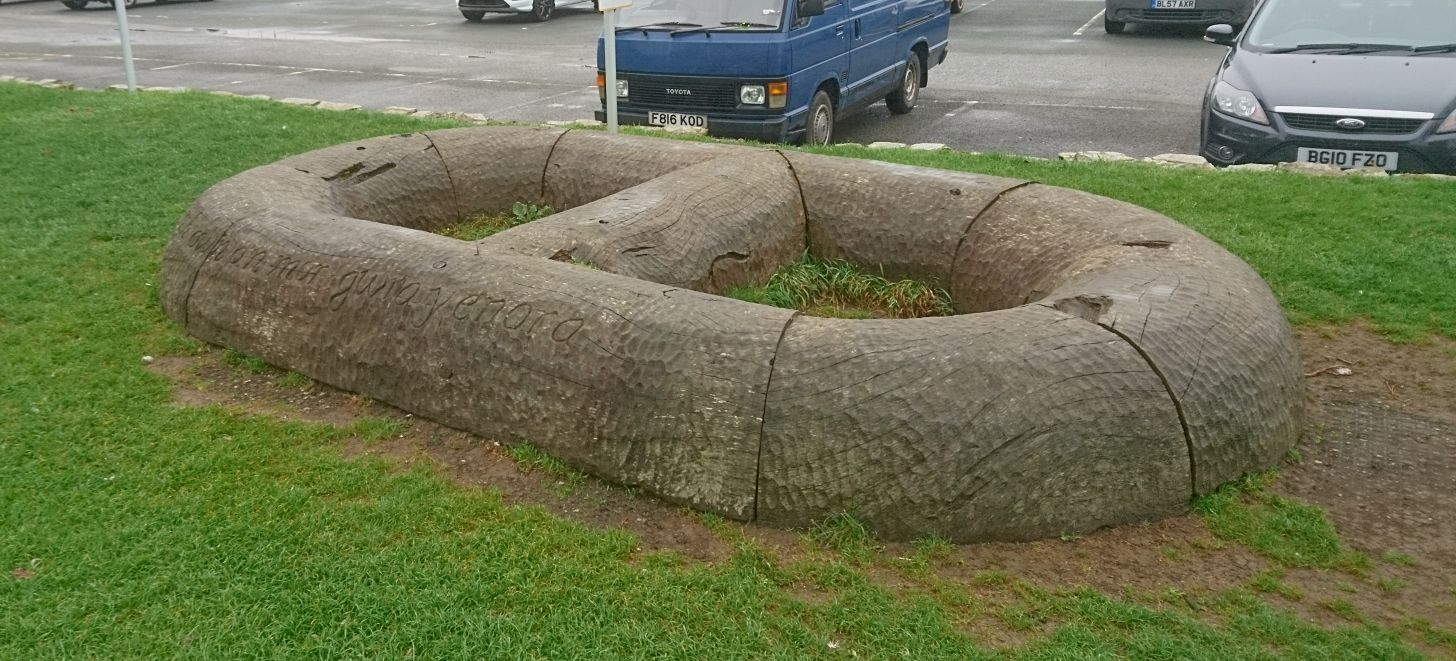
Part of a wooden sculpture by Daniel Sodhi-Miles. It is inscribed in Cornish and English with "Don’t be afraid of the sea, respect it".

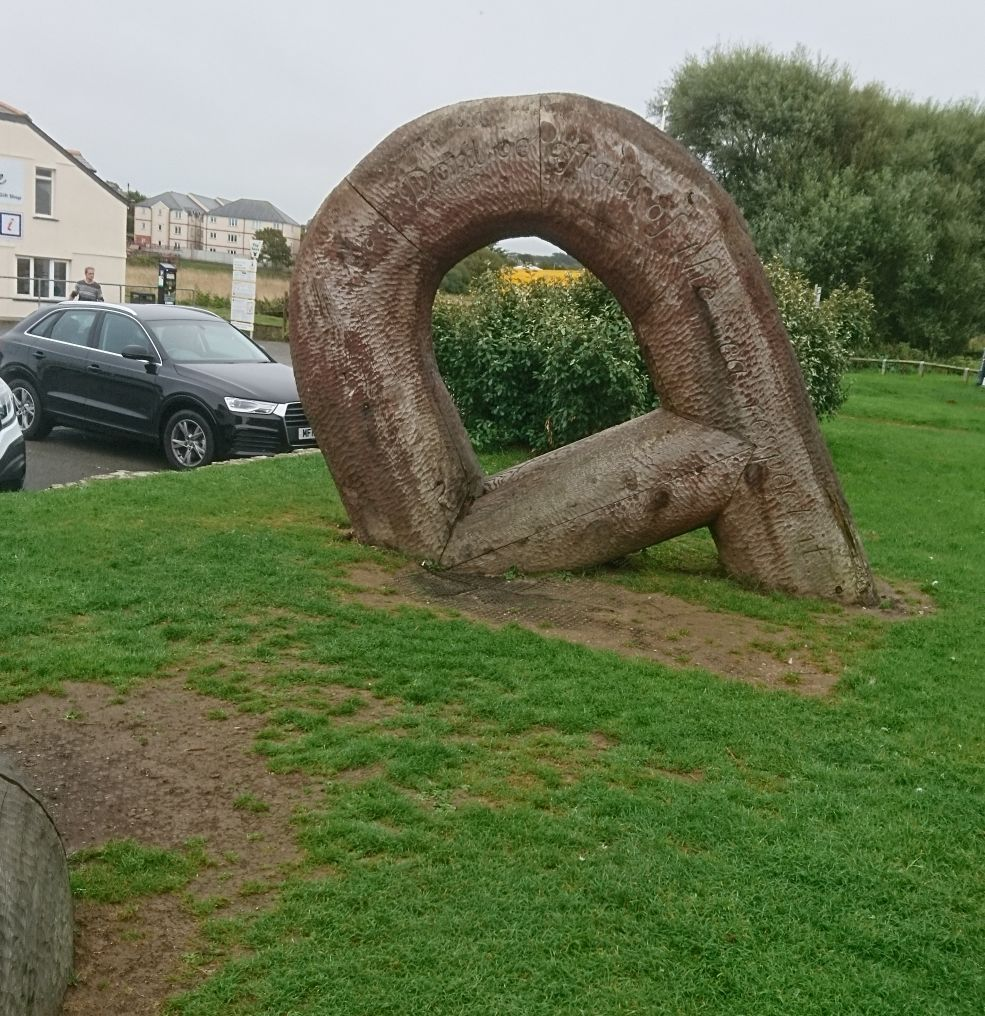
Second part of a wooden sculpture by Daniel Sodhi-Miles. It is inscribed in Cornish and English with "If a man could have the strength of the sea, he’d be a strong man".

== March 2008 damage ==
On Monday 10 March 2008, a powerful storm wrenched one of the lock gates off its fixings. Contractors removed the gate the following morning, and four-tonne concrete pipes were placed in the canal basin to dissipate the power of waves coming in from the sea. A temporary dam was constructed at Falcon Bridge, and a team of anglers and staff from the Environment Agency rescued the fish population before it was swept out to sea. Beyond the dam, the loss of water was contained, with levels only dropping by about 8 inches (20 cm), but at the lower end of the canal water continued to flow out until it was practically empty, revealing some interesting finds in the mud, including a shotgun.

The North Cornwall District Council used the opportunity to repair the canal walls and dredge the basin. During the course of the dredging, over 6,000 cubic metres (7,800 cu yd) of silt were removed. It was originally intended to refill the basin gradually after 8 July 2008, but a period of intense rainfall prior to that date resulted in a surge of water passing down the canal, which damaged the coffer dam protecting the empty section from the watered section. Consequently, the basin refilled in a single day.

== Route coordinates ==
Main line Bude to Launceston

Point	Coordinates (Links to map resources)	OS Grid Ref	Notes
Bude Sea Lock	50.82934°N 4.55151°W	SS204064	Restored
Lower Wharf	50.82759°N 4.54764°W	SS207062	
Falcon Bridge	50.82705°N 4.54717°W	SS207061	Limit of navigation
Upper Wharf	50.82575°N 4.54680°W	SS207060	
Rodds Bridge	50.81519°N 4.54191°W	SS210048	
Rodds Bridge Lock	50.81364°N 4.54022°W	SS211046	Restored
Whalesborough Lock	50.81019°N 4.53798°W	SS213043	Restored
A39 road bridge	50.80545°N 4.53474°W	SS215037	
Hele Bridge (original)	50.80555°N 4.53396°W	SS216037	End of watered canal
Marhamchurch Incline	50.80565°N 4.52791°W	SS220037	
Mile post (Bude 3)	50.80992°N 4.51646°W	SS228042	
Mile post (Bude 4)	50.81405°N 4.50395°W	SS237046	
Hobbacott Incline	50.81545°N 4.49516°W	SS243047	
Mile post (Bude 5)	50.81582°N 4.48417°W	SS251047	
Thurlibeer aqueduct	50.81599°N 4.48097°W	SS253048	
Launceston Road	50.81865°N 4.46622°W	SS264050	
Holsworthy Branch Junction	50.818605°N 4.464764°W	SS265050	
Littlebridge Wharf	50.79980°N 4.45493°W	SS271029	
Merrifield Incline	50.78902°N 4.45429°W	SS271017	
North Tamerton Wharf	50.75081°N 4.38857°W	SX316973	
Tamerton Incline	50.736075°N 4.37557°W	SX325956	
Boyton Bridge Wharf	50.70528°N 4.37209°W	SX326922	
Bridgetown Incline	50.68965°N 4.35308°W	SX339904	
Druxton Wharf	50.67066°N 4.34911°W	SX341883	

Holsworthy Branch

Point	Coordinates (Links to map resources)	OS Grid Ref	Notes
Mile post (Bude 7)	50.81944°N 4.44732°W	SS277051	
Shernick Bridge & Anderton Wharf	50.82318°N 4.44882°W	SS276055	
Anderton Bridge	50.82530°N 4.44593°W	SS278057	
Mile post (Bude 8)	50.82939°N 4.44740°W	SS277062	
Burmsdon aqueduct	50.83363°N 4.44252°W	SS281066	
Vealand Incline	50.834145°N 4.43689°W	SS285067	
Vealand Bridge	50.83487°N 4.42791°W	SS291067	
Junction with feeder	50.83749°N 4.42466°W	SS294107	
Parnacott Wharf	50.82326°N 4.38629°W	SS320053	
Stanbury (Holsworthy) Wharf	50.82145°N 4.34533°W	SS349051	
Blagdon Moor Wharf	50.82887°N 4.32832°W	SS361058	

Feeder from Lower Tamar Lake

Point	Coordinates (Links to map resources)	OS Grid Ref	Notes
Brendon Bridge	50.83965°N 4.42438°W	SS294073	
Gainsmoor Bridge	50.84517°N 4.42067°W	SS297079	
Puckland	50.84833°N 4.43226°W	SS289508	
Dexbeer Bridge	50.85299°N 4.42378°W	SS295087	
Wooda Bridge	50.8562°N 4.41607°W	SS300091	
Virworthy Aqueduct	50.8646°N 4.41197°W	SS304310	
Virwirthy Mill	50.86494°N 4.41603°W	SS301101	
Virworthy Wharf	50.8667°N 4.41971°W	SS298103	
Lower Tamar Lake	50.87118°N 4.42324°W	SS296108	

Route details extracted from 1885 OS maps.

== See also ==
- Canals of the United Kingdom
- History of the British canal system
- List of reservoirs and dams in the United Kingdom

== Bibliography ==
- David, Charlie (2009). "(based on) Chapter 11: The Regeneration Project". In Young, Bill; Stamp, Bryan (eds.). Bude Canal Past and Present. Archived from the original on 10 May 2018.
- Harris, Helen (1996). The Grand Western Canal. Devon Books. ISBN 978-0-86114-901-8.
- Harris, H; Ellis, M (1972). The Bude Canal. Newton Abbot: David & Charles. ISBN 978-0-7153-7018-6.
- Phillips, John (1792). A general history of inland navigation, foreign and domestic (2 ed.). Holborn, London: Architectural Library. OCLC 433597060.
- Quinlan, R (1994). Canal Walks of England and Wales. Stroud, Glos: Alan Sutton Publishing. ISBN 978-0-7509-0608-1.
- Whitaker, Mike (May 2008). Sea Lock Damaged by Storm. Waterways World. ISSN 0309-1422.
