= Juthwara =

British martyr

Saint Juthwara
- Died: c. eighth or sixth century
- Venerated in: Catholic Church; Eastern Orthodox Church
- Major shrine: Sherborne Abbey (until the sixteenth century)
- Feast: 18 November (Catholicism); 1 July, July 13 (Orthodoxy)
- Attributes: round soft cheese; sword; with Sidwell; as cephalophore

Juthwara or Jutwara was a virgin and martyr from Dorset. According to her legend, she was an eighth-century Saxon, and sister to Sidwell, though some historians have theorised she was a Briton living in the sixth century. Her relics were translated to Sherborne during the reign of Ethelred the Unready. Nothing further is known with certainty about her life.

Juthwara's name is how she is known in Anglo-Saxon. Some have suggested that it is a corruption of the British Aud Wyry (meaning Aud the Virgin), the name by which she is known in Brittany. However, since Aud Wyry simply means "Aud the Virgin" (Aud is a Germanic name used in Northern France and not a Celtic name) it is more likely that Aud Wyry is a Breton reinterpretation of her original name. Those who prefer a 6th-century British origin have hypothesised her as sister to Paul Aurelian and Wulvela, though this is debated.

== Legend ==
The legend of Juthwara is known from John Capgrave's Nova Legenda Angliae, after John of Tynemouth mid-fourteenth century. According to this, she was a pious girl who was the victim of a jealous stepmother. She prayed and fasted often, and frequently gave alms. Upon the death of her father, she began to suffer pain in her chest. Its source was ascribed to her sorrow and austerities. As a remedy, her stepmother recommended two soft cheeses be applied to her breasts, telling her son, Bana, that Juthwara was pregnant. Bana felt her underclothes and found them moist, whereupon he immediately struck off her head. A spring of water appeared at the spot. Juthwara then miraculously picked up her head and carried it back to the church. According to the Breton tradition, Bana repented of his deed and became a monk, founding a monastery of Gerber (later known as Le Relecq) on a battlefield.

== Location ==
Juthwara's death took place at Halyngstoka, generally accepted as Halstock in Dorset, where she is known as Juthware, and where local tradition points to a field still called by her name, modernised to 'Judith'. Baring-Gould and Fisher suggested instead Lanteglos-by-Camelford in North Cornwall where the church is now named for Julitta, but may have originally borne Juthwara's name. At Laneast ten miles to the east the church is dedicated to her sisters, but this has apparently arisen by a modern confusion between Laneast and Gulval (also known as Lanestly): at Laneast the dedication in 1436 was to SS. Sativola and Thomas the Martyr, Wolvela does not appear until George Oliver's Monasticon.

In July 2012, Halstock's parish church of St Mary had its dedication extended to include Juthware, in recognition of the local tradition.

== Veneration ==
Juthwara's feast day is 28 November, though A Devon And Cornwall Calendar gives 13 July and refers to other sources as giving 23 December.

Juthwara's body was translated to Sherborne Abbey in the early eleventh century and her shrine remained a place of pilgrimage there until the Dissolution. The Sherborne Missal (c.1400), contains a Mass for St Juthware for 13th July, the date of her translation, and an illustration of Juthwara's beheading.

Juthwara is depicted in the Great East Window of Sherborne Abbey, and on a number of altar screens in Devon, in company with her sister Sidwell. Her traditional emblem is a round soft cheese and/or a sword. She is depicted as a cephalophore in a late medieval statue in Guizeny, in Brittany.
