= St Sidwells =

Coordinates: 50°44′N 3°31′W

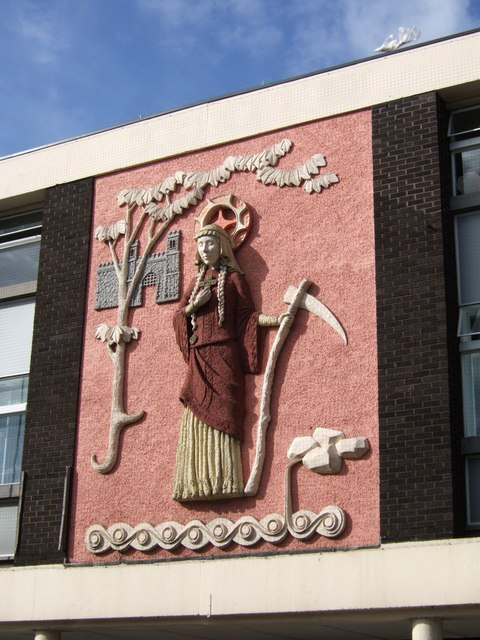
Relief of Saint Sidwell, on Sidwell Street, St Sidwells

St Sidwell's is an area east of Exeter city centre in the ward of Newtown. Formerly a village in its own right, St Sidwell's grew in importance along with Exeter thanks to its location on the main cart track between Exeter and the high ground of Stoke Hill and the rich farmland of East Devon.

== History ==
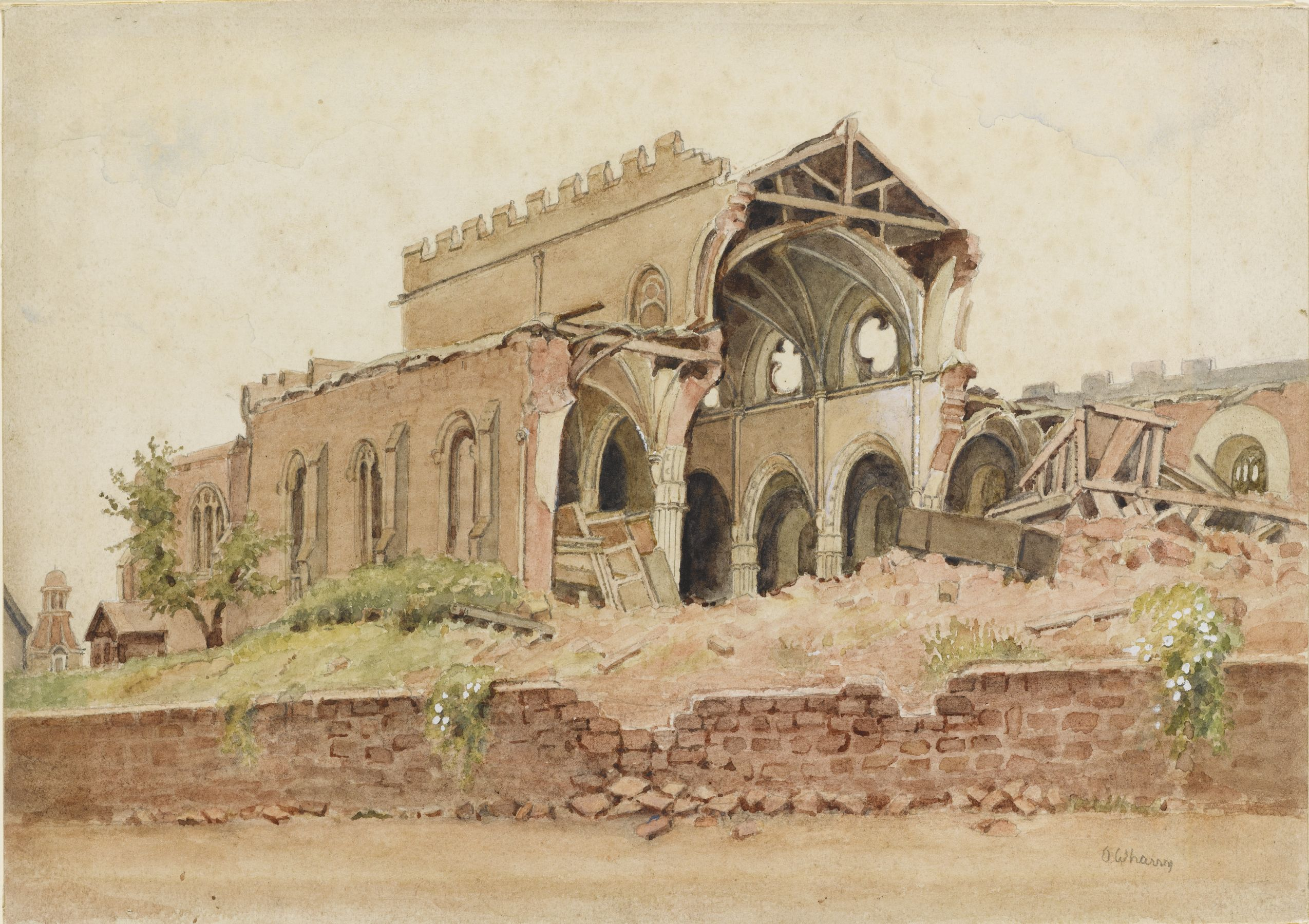
Watercolour by Olive Wharry circa 1942 of St. Sidwell’s Church, Exeter, after the Blitz. In the early hours of 4 May 1942 a 250kg bomb fell directly on St Sidwells. The church tower was left standing but was so badly damaged that it was pulled down shortly after. A replacement church was built on the site

The springs of St Sidwell's were tapped by the Romans for the needs of the city and their water piped via wooden aqueducts to supply their citadel. This system became the underground passages of the 13th century and was only turned off in 1902. The settlement's current name derives from Saint Sidwell.

In 1665, St Sidwell's Church of England School was founded and is still there to this day as a primary school. Children's author Gene Kemp taught at the school in the 1970s.

== Geography ==
St Sidwell's comprises part of Exeter City Centre (Sidwell Street) to the west and a residential area to the east. It is south of Pennsylvania and north of Newtown. Sidwell Street is the main road through the area, which splits into Old Tiverton Road and Blackboy road further east. It is the eastern end of the city centre. The nearest railway station is St James Park.

== In popular culture ==
The parish is mentioned in an 1865 edition of Charles Dickens' magazine All the Year Round:

There was a remote parish—that of St. Sidwell’s—the claims of whose “boys” to the right of citizenship were doubtful. They were contumaciously called Grecians; but the parish being large, and its warriors numerous, the citizen lads were accustomed to combine against “the outer barbarians,” and the battles raged furiously, and black eyes and bloody noses were left to exhibit the results of the fray.

— Anonymous, "Exeter Sixty Years Ago". All the Year Round 28 October 1865; volume 14 number 340 page 320

== Notable people ==
- Sabine Baring-Gould (1834–1924), Anglican priest, hagiographer, antiquarian, novelist, folk song collector and eclectic scholar
- British bryologist Frances Elizabeth Tripp (1832–1890) was baptised here.

== Sources ==
- Evidence Base: Exeter St. James Neighbourhood Plan
