= Frances Elizabeth Tripp =

British author, scientific illustrator, botanist and botanical collector (1832–1890)

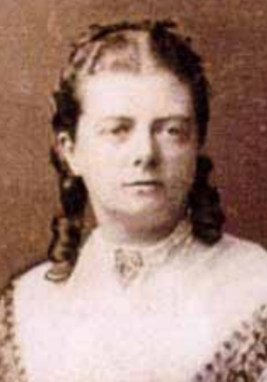
- Fanny Tripp, c. 1860
- Born: 1 August 1832
- Died: 26 December 1890 (aged 58); London
- Occupations: Botanist; philanthropist
- Notable work: British mosses, their homes, aspects, structure and uses

Frances Elizabeth Tripp (1 August 1832 – 26 December 1890) was a British bryologist, botanical illustrator, philanthropist and writer. She is best known for her two volume work British Mosses, their homes, aspects, structures and uses, which was first published in 1868 and ran to three editions.

== Biography ==
Frances Elizabeth Tripp was born on 1 August 1832 and was christened at St Sidwells, Exeter, Devon. Her father was the Reverend Robert Henry Tripp, and her mother was Elizabeth Ann; her parents were first cousins. Her father was vicar of Altarnun in Cornwall, close to Bodmin Moor. Frances had seven younger siblings: five brothers – Reverend Robert Henry (1835–1904), Reverend George (1837–1896), John Chilcott (1838–1839), Charles Upton (1841–1912), William Blomefield (1843–1919, who became a civil engineer); two sisters – Emma Mary (1834–1835), and Emma Mary (the second, 1845–1902).

After inheriting a considerable amount of money from her grandmother, Tripp pursued scientific research and charitable causes. She raised money to support the cause of Italian unification, supported the Kyrle Society and was involved in the early establishment of National Trust. In later life she moved to London, where she died on 26 December 1890 following a heart attack.

== British Mosses ==
Tripp's work British Mosses was written as a popular scientific volume which she also illustrated, by etching copper plates which were then coloured by Benjamin Fawcett. The work ran to three editions: 1868; 1874; 1888. On the publication on its third edition, the two-volume work was described in Sotheran's Guide as: "to read, to ponder, to mark, to learn and inwardly digest". It was also reviewed in Nature which described its style as "highly poetical" and tending to "dryness" in later passages.

== Gallery ==
Cover, 1874 edition

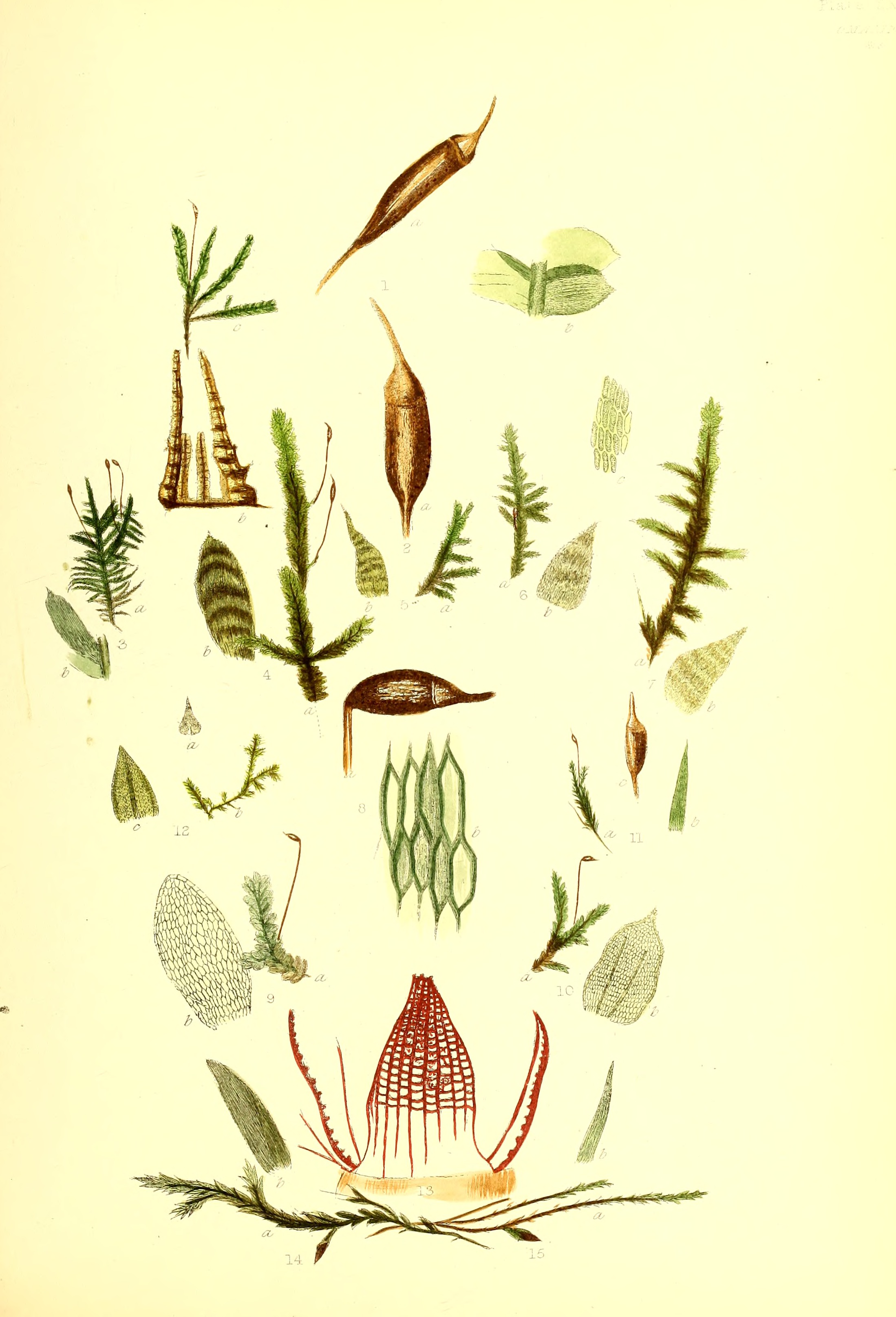

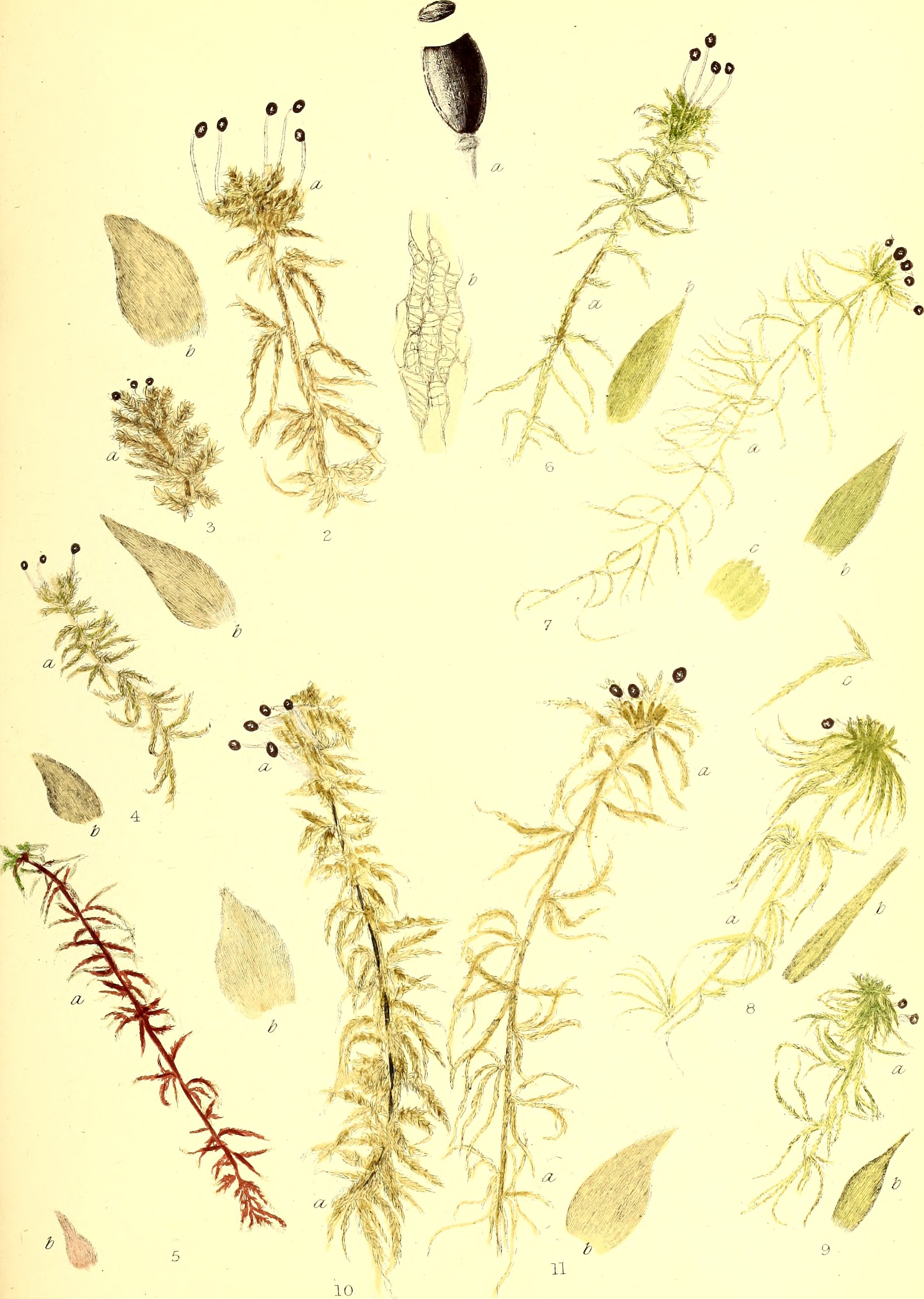

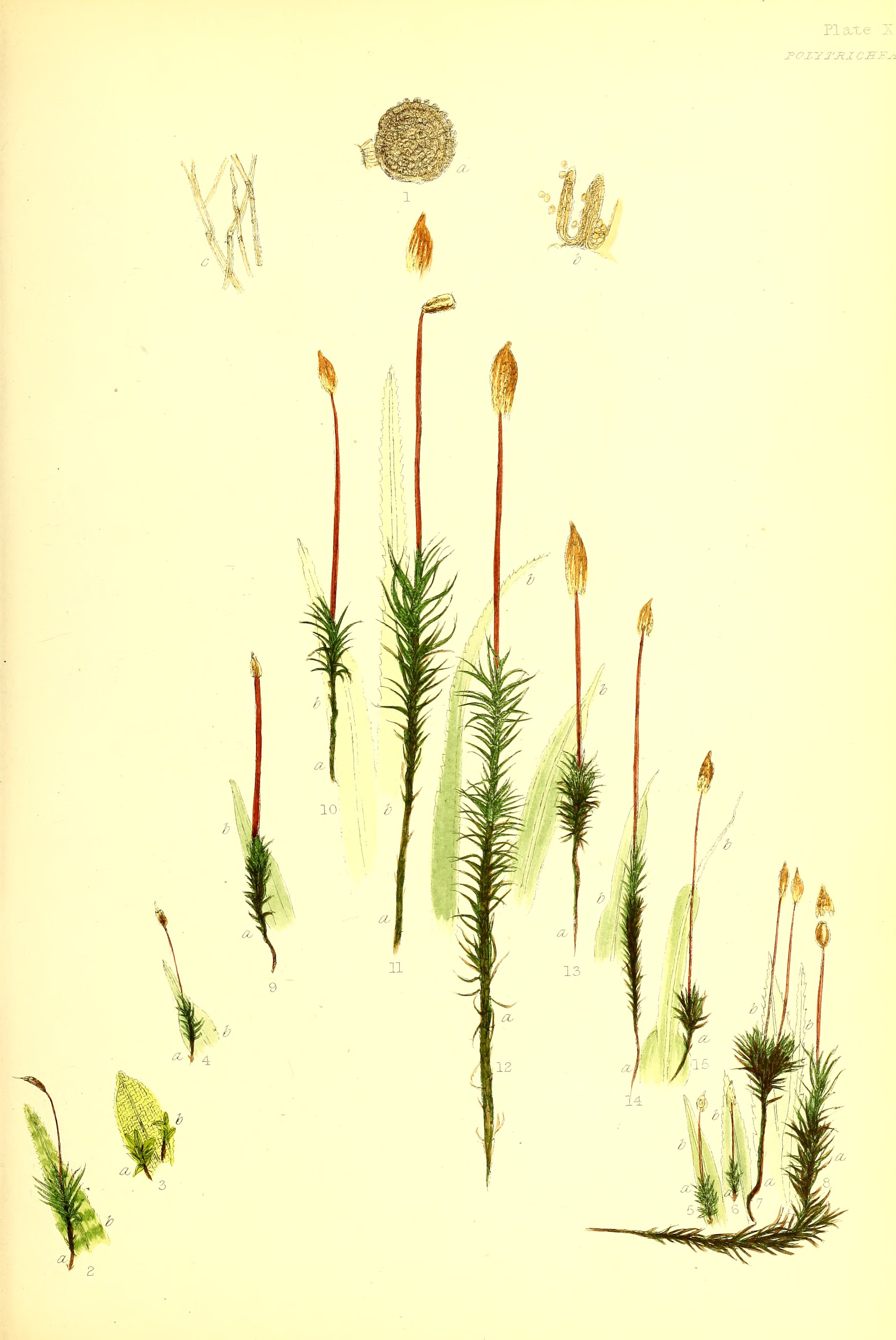

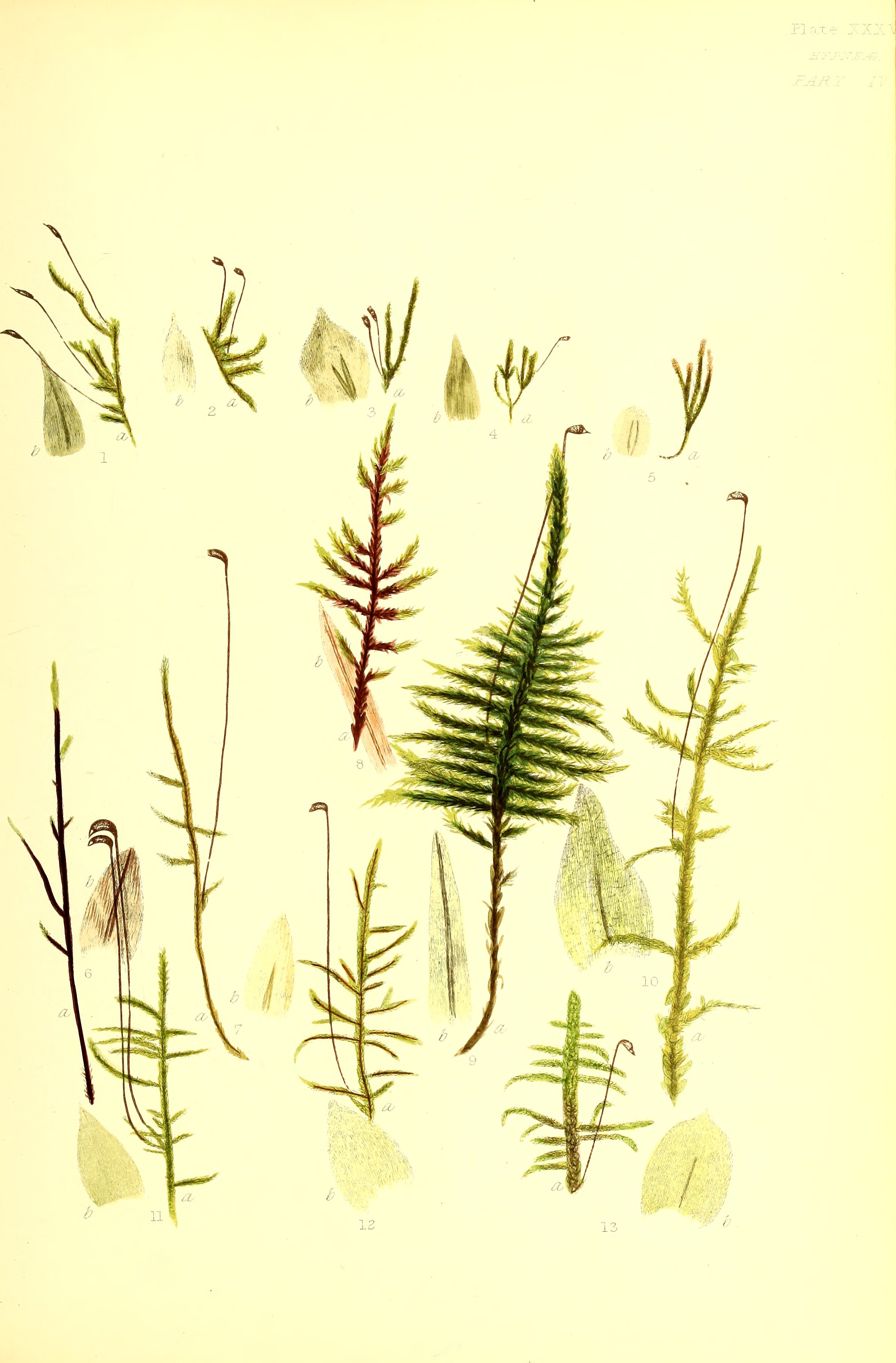

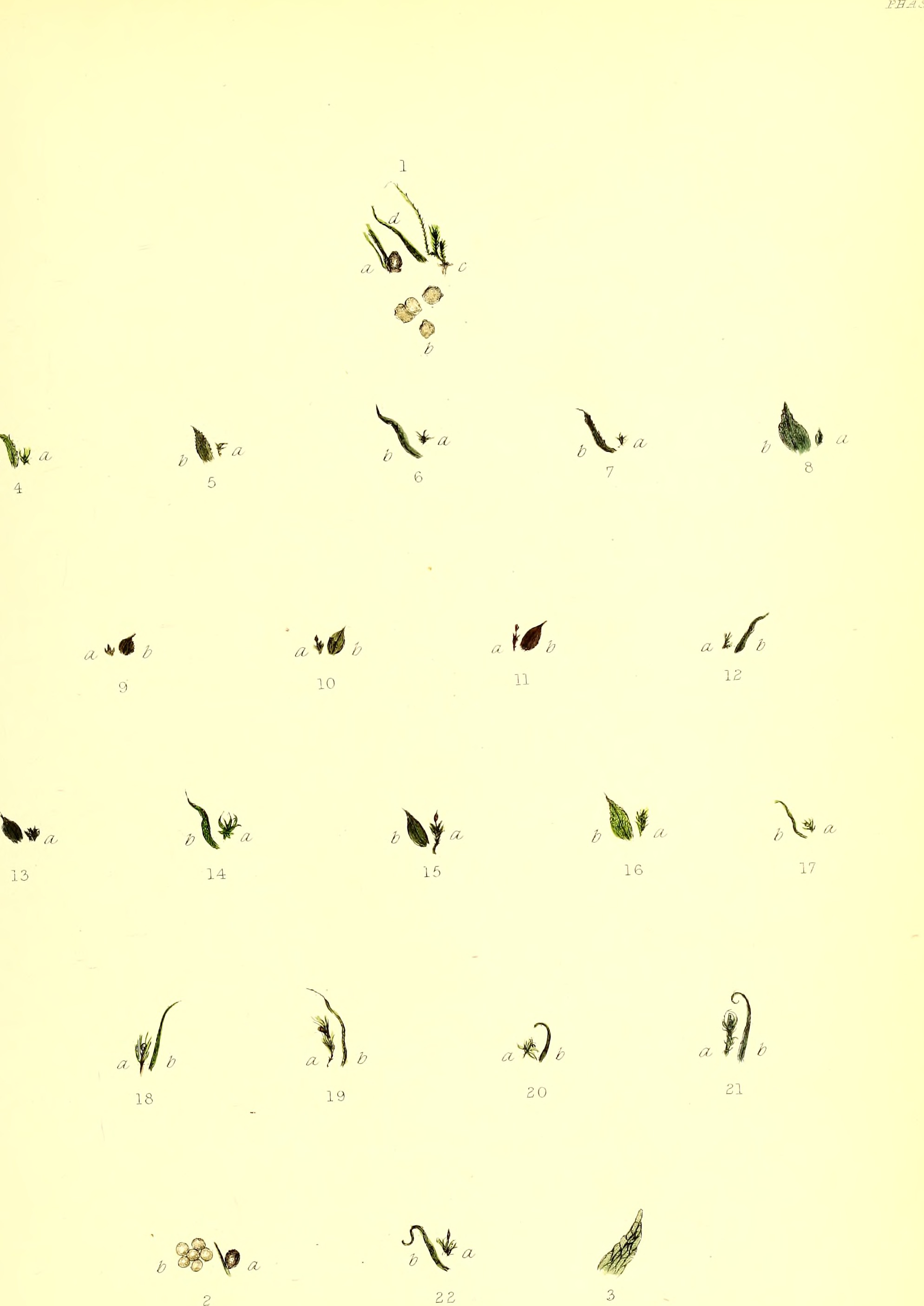
