= Benjamin Fawcett =

English wood-engraver and colour printer

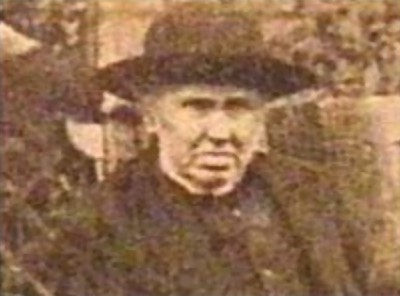
Benjamin Fawcett

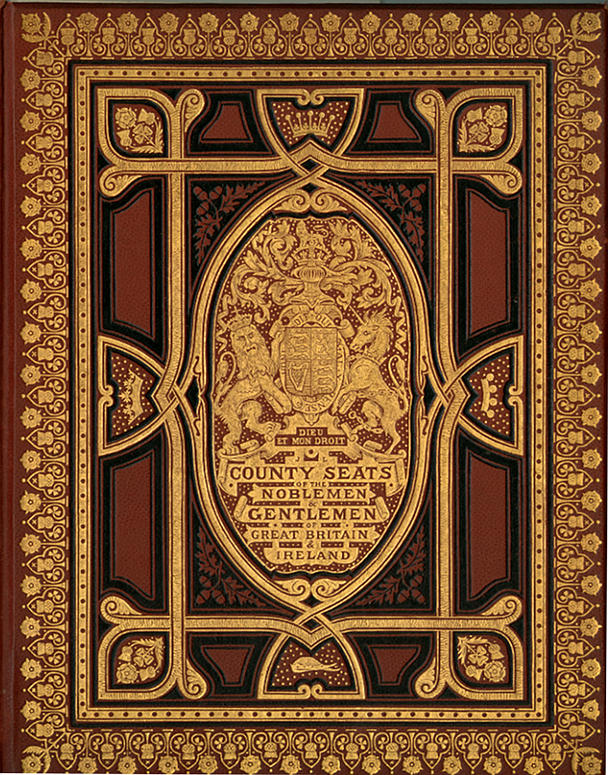
County Seats of The Noblemen and Gentlemen of Great Britain and Ireland (1870)

Benjamin Fawcett (December 1808, in Bridlington, East Riding of Yorkshire – January 1893) was an English nineteenth century wood-engraver and colour printer.

== Life ==
The son of a ship's master, Fawcett was apprenticed at age 14 for seven years to William Forth, a Bridlington bookseller and printer. In 1831, he started his own business in Middle Street, Driffield, as music seller, bookbinder and printer, bookseller and stationer.

He married Mary Ann Woodmansey in 1830, with whom he had two sons before her death in 1834. He was married again in 1848, to one of his colourists Martha Porter who was 20 years his junior and heavily pregnant at the time. They raised four daughters and six sons.

Benjamin Fawcett died in January 1893, a few weeks before his associate Francis Orpen Morris.

== Works ==
His early works were mostly children's books published by Webb & Millington of Leeds. In about 1845 he formed a close working association with Francis Orpen Morris. This relationship would last nearly 50 years and have a profound effect on British ornithology. Morris wrote the text for books which were financed and printed by Fawcett, and were engraved by Alexander Francis Lydon (1836–1917), who had started his career as Fawcett's apprentice. Colour printing was a major change from the much-admired monochrome work of Thomas Bewick (1753–1828). At first wood-engraving illustrations were coloured by hand, but later a system of colouring from multiple wood blocks was used.

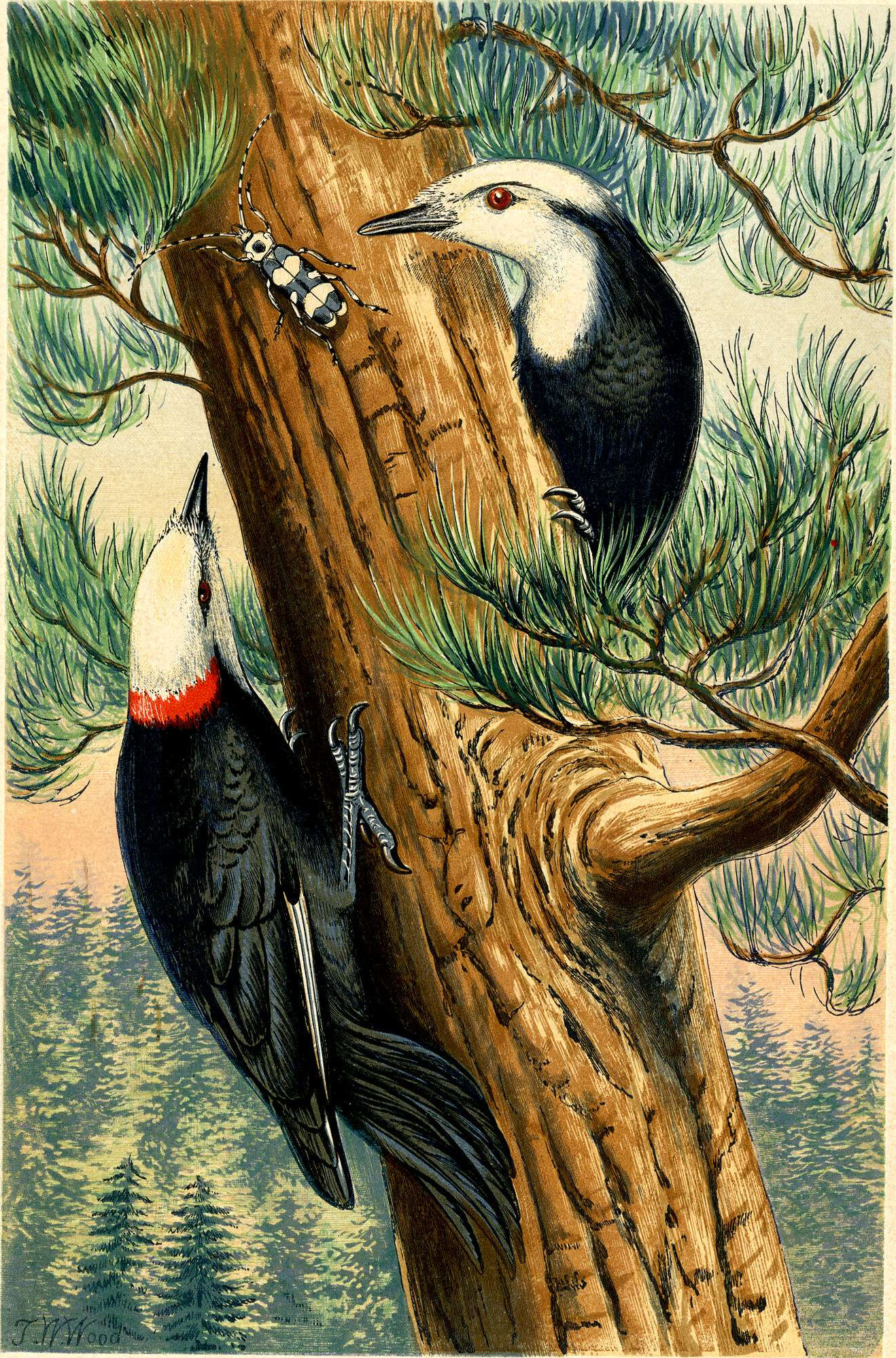
"White-headed Woodpecker", wood-engraving by Fawcett, drawing by T. W. Wood

Fawcett colourised the etched copper plates which were created by bryologist Frances Elizabeth Tripp to accompany her two-volume guide British Mosses.

== Selected books printed by Fawcett ==
- A Natural History of British Birds. The Rev. Francis Orpen Morris (1850–1857) 6 vols., 8vo, Groombridge.
- British Fresh-water Fishes. The Rev. William Houghton (Two volume set). Benjamin Fawcett [printer], A F Lydon [artwork], Publisher William Mackenzie: [1879]: London. First Edition xxvi, 202pp (380 x 290 mm), Illustrated with 41 full-page colour plates as well as vignette head pieces, brick-red cloth, with piscatorial emblems. 41 tissue-guarded colour-printed xylograph plates by Benjamin Fawcett of Driffield after A.F.Lydon, and another 64 woodcuts by Lydon.
- Parrots in Captivity. William Greene.
- Alpine Plants. David Wooster.
- County Seats of The Noblemen and Gentlemen of Great Britain and Ireland. The Rev. Francis Orpen Morris (1870). William Mackenzie, Ludgate Hill.
