= William Grylls Adams =

William Grylls Adams FRS
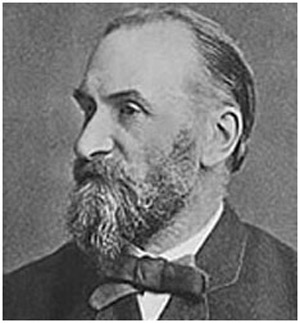
- Born: 18 February 1836; Laneast, Cornwall
- Died: 10 April 1915 (aged 79)

Academic background
- Education: St. John's College, Cambridge

Academic work
- Discipline: Natural philosophy; physics; astronomy
- Institutions: King's College, London

William Grylls Adams FRS (18 February 1836 in Laneast, Cornwall – 10 April 1915) was professor of Natural Philosophy at King's College, London. He was active in research on subjects ranging from light, magnetism, and astronomy to electrical power generation and transmission. His research in optics yielded the discovery that certain materials, notably selenium, produce an electric current when exposed to light. Adams also actively participated in many academic societies and held major positions within the societies.

== Family ==
William Grylls Adams was the youngest son of the seven children, four sons and three daughters, of Thomas Adams and Tabitha Knill Grylls. The astronomer John Couch Adams was his older brother.

== Education ==
Adams attended St. John's College, Cambridge, and graduated as 11th Wrangler in 1855. He subsequently held positions at several other institutions, including vice-principal of Peterborough Training College in 1859 and mathematics master at Marlborough College in 1860. In 1863 Adams moved to King's College, London, where he worked under James Clerk Maxwell as a natural philosophy lecturer. He undertook a teaching post at Highgate School in 1864.

== King's College ==
Adams was a pioneer in the development of science education, in particular manufacturing and engineering. He focused on practical application of conceptual physics material to engineering practices. This model worked well enough that the rest of the department adopted the model. He also worked to increase funding through laboratory accommodations and the Whitworth scholarship scheme.

== Career ==
In 1839, Alexandre Edmond Becquerel had discovered that illumination of one of two metal plates in a dilute acid changed the electromotive force (EMF). Adams, however, had a wide area of interest, chief among these was light and magnetism. Light was the focus of Adams' research, which began in 1871, in which he studied the effects of polarization. In order to study the effects of polarization on various substances like selenium and tellurium, Adams developed a new variant of the polariscope. In doing this, he was able to research "the optical axes of biaxial crystals." In 1876, Adams and Richard Evans Day discovered that illuminating a junction between selenium and platinum has a photovoltaic effect. This first demonstrated that electricity could be produced from light without moving parts and led to the modern solar cell. The two also found that "the ultra-red or the ultra-violet rays have little or no effect; also that the intensity of the action depends on the illuminating power of the light, being directly as the square root of that illuminating power."

Although his focus was light, magnetism was also heavy in his research. In this area, his focus was the resistance change in materials due to magnetism. Adams also compared readings of magnetographs form the observatories of various European cities and compared the “disturbances that were produced simultaneously at a number of locations." Adams was able to collect and analyze the data to make recommendations on how to calibrate the machinery with specific constants.

The field of astronomy also drew Adams' attention and eventually lead him to Italy to study eclipses. He also ventured into areas such as electrical power generation and transmission, specifically lighthouse illumination. In this area, he compared varying aspects electric and oil lights for Trinity House. Adams was on the forefront of this field, and "gave a presidential address outlining the efficiency of dynamos used at the Crystal Palace in 1882."

Outside of his main position at King's College Adams was extremely active in academic pursuits. Among these were the Department of Science and Art and the universities of Cambridge and London, where he held the title of "examiner" in the field of physics from 1879 to 1892.

== Societies and Fellowships ==
From 1878 to 1880 he was President of the Physical Society of London. In June 1872 he was elected a Fellow of the Royal Society and in 1875 delivered their Bakerian Lecture. He was president of the Institution of Electrical Engineers and of the mathematical and physical section of the British Association. Adams was also a frequent attendee to the lectures of John Tyndall at the Royal Institution. One of is duties for the Royal Society was being a member of the Kew observatory committee. Adams was also active at the Royal Observatory, Greenwich, as a member of the board of visitors.

== Later years ==
"In 1905 Adams retired from King’s College, London, he went to live at Heathfield in Broadstone, Dorset. He would later die here on 10 April 1915".

== Works ==
- Solar Heat: A Substitute Fuel for Tropical Countries, Bombay, 1878; Chadwyck-Healey Ltd., 2001
- The action of light on selenium, 1875
- On the action of light on tellurium and selenium, 1876
- Simultaneous magnetic disturbances
- Alternate current machines
- Testing of dynamo machines
