= John Gubbins Newton and His Sister, Mary Newton =

1833 painting by Robert Burnard

Coordinates: 41.307954°N 72.930693°W

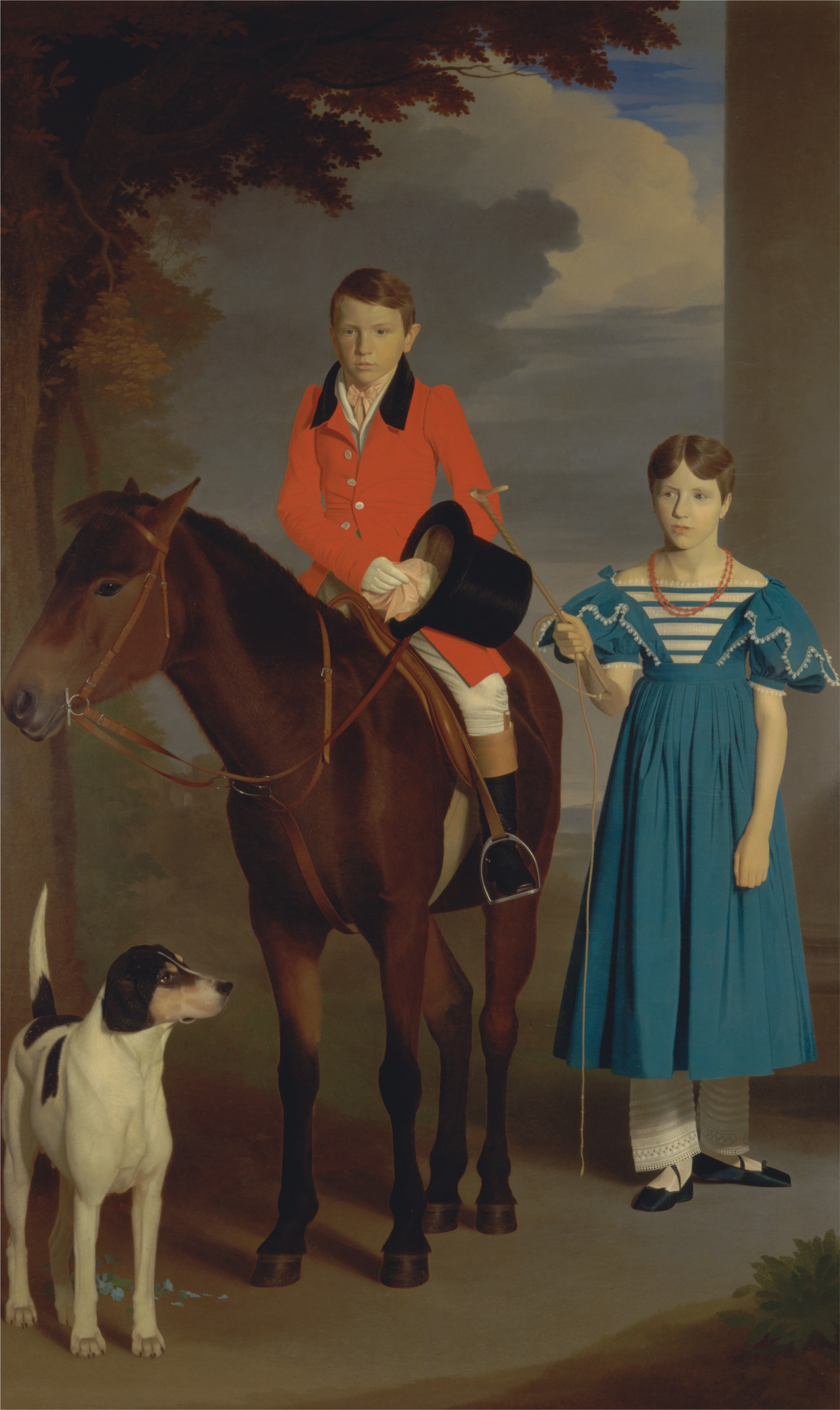
- Artist: Robert Burnard
- Year: 1833
- Type: Oil painting
- Dimensions: 235 cm × 143.5 cm (93 in × 56.5 in)
- Location: Yale Center for British Art; New Haven
- Owner: Yale Center for British Art

John Gubbins Newton and His Sister, Mary Newton is an 1833 painting by Robert Burnard. It is now in the Yale Center for British Art, as part of the Paul Mellon collection, where it has the accession number B2001.2.66.

== Description ==
The painting, a full-length portrait, shows John Gubbins Newton on a horse, with his sister, Mary Newton, beside him. At the time of the painting, John was six years old and Mary was ten years old. Judy Egerton wrote that there is nothing remotely like it in English portraiture of the second quarter of the nineteenth century. Grace Glueck described it as "a little-known dazzler".

== Attribution ==
The painting has been attributed to at least three painters. In 1963, Basil Taylor attributed the painting to Jacques-Laurent Agasse. In 1978, Judy Egerton attributed the painting to Scottish portrait and history painter John Zephaniah Bell. When the portrait was cleaned by Lance Mayer for the 2001 exhibition, The Paul Mellon Bequest: Treasures of a Lifetime, a signature ('R. Burnard pinxit') was discovered in the foliage in the upper left corner of the painting. On the basis of the signature, the painting was attributed to Robert Burnard.

== Provenance ==
John Gubbins Newton and Mary Newton were the only children of John Newton of Devon. The painting stayed at the Newton’s Millaton House for over a hundred years until 1955, when it was bought by J. Andrews, of Tavistock, Devon. Then it was bought by Cyril Steal who sold it to Jeremy Maas in 1961. Later that same year, Paul Mellon bought it. The painting remained in Mellon's house in Upperville, Virginia until 1999, when it was moved to the Yale Center for British Art in New Haven, Connecticut.
