= Robert Burnard (painter) =

English painter

- Born: 1799/1800; Laneast
- Died: 1846/1847 or 13 April 1876; Adelaide
- Occupation: painter

Robert Burnard (1799/1800 – 1846/1847 or 13 April 1876) was a Cornish painter. Burnard painted houses as well as portraits. Burnard was born in 1799 or 1800 in Laneast, the son of Elizabeth Westlake Burnard and Richard Parnell Burnard. He emigrated to Australia in 1840. The year of his death is uncertain, as his son with the same name had a very similar career; some sources state that he died by 1847 (an article in the South Australian Register said he was "departed") whereas others list 13 April 1876.

The John Gubbins Newton and His Sister, Mary Newton painting is the only known English painting (prior to Australian emigration) that can with certainty be ascribed to Burnard.

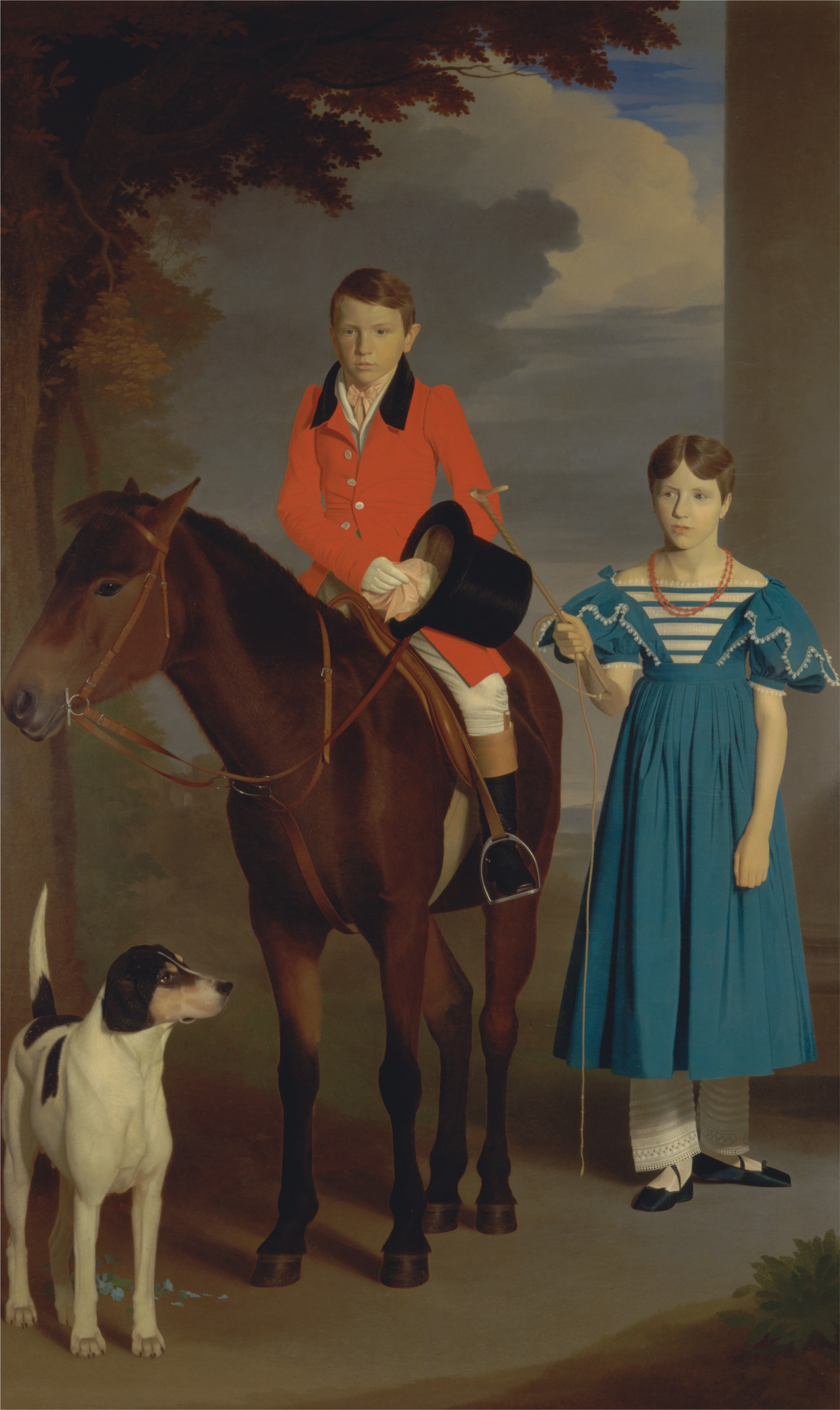
John Gubbins Newton and His Sister, Mary Newton by Robert Burnard
