= Saint Sidwell =

West Saxon saint

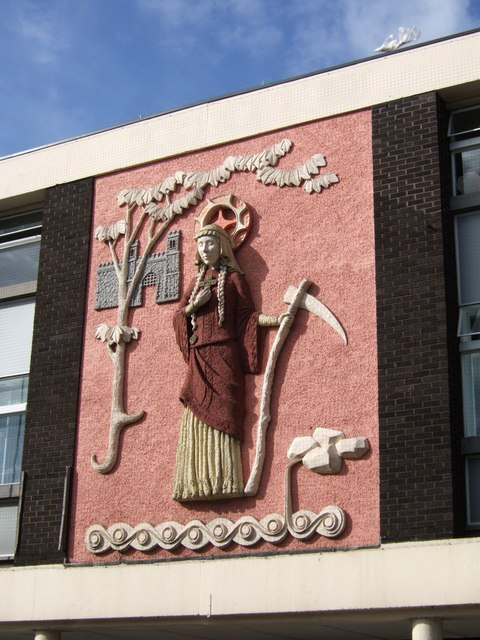
- The relief of Saint Sidwell on a shopping arcade in Sidwell Street, Exeter.
- Died: c.740
- Venerated in: Roman Catholic Church, Orthodox Church, Anglican Communion
- Feast: 31 July (Orthodox Church); 2 August (Church of England)
- Attributes: Scythe; Holy Well; Lammas

Sidwell (also known as Sidwella and other minor variants; Latin: Sativola) was a virgin saint from the English county of Devon. She is the patroness saint of Exeter and sister to Juthwara.

== Legend ==
Sidwell was a Saxon Christian living in Exeter in the 8th century. Her father was a wealthy landowner named Benna, who died leaving his daughter in the care of a cruel stepmother, who was jealous of her beauty and virtue and coveted her inheritance.

Sidwell often left the city to bring food to the villagers working the fields outside the city walls. The Catalogus Sanctorum Pausantium in Anglia says she was beheaded by a couple of corn reapers, hired to do so by her stepmother. They cut off her head with a scythe, and where her head came to rest, water sprang up. A shaft of light shone over the site for three nights. She was buried at St Sidwells. Her ghost was reputedly seen carrying her severed head and putting it back on her shoulders at the spot where she was later buried. The story bears a striking similarity to that of both Urith and Juthwara of Sherborne, her supposed sister.

(The springs at St Sidwell's had existed since Roman times, and had been tapped for the needs of the city with the water piped via wooden aqueducts to supply the citadel. The fort was abandoned around the year 75 when the troops were relocated to Isca Augusta.)

The spring became the Well of St Sidwell, near the corner of present-day Well Street and York Road. It was a place of pilgrimage in Anglo-Saxon and Norman England. It can now be found inside the building at Number 3, Well Street.

== Veneration ==
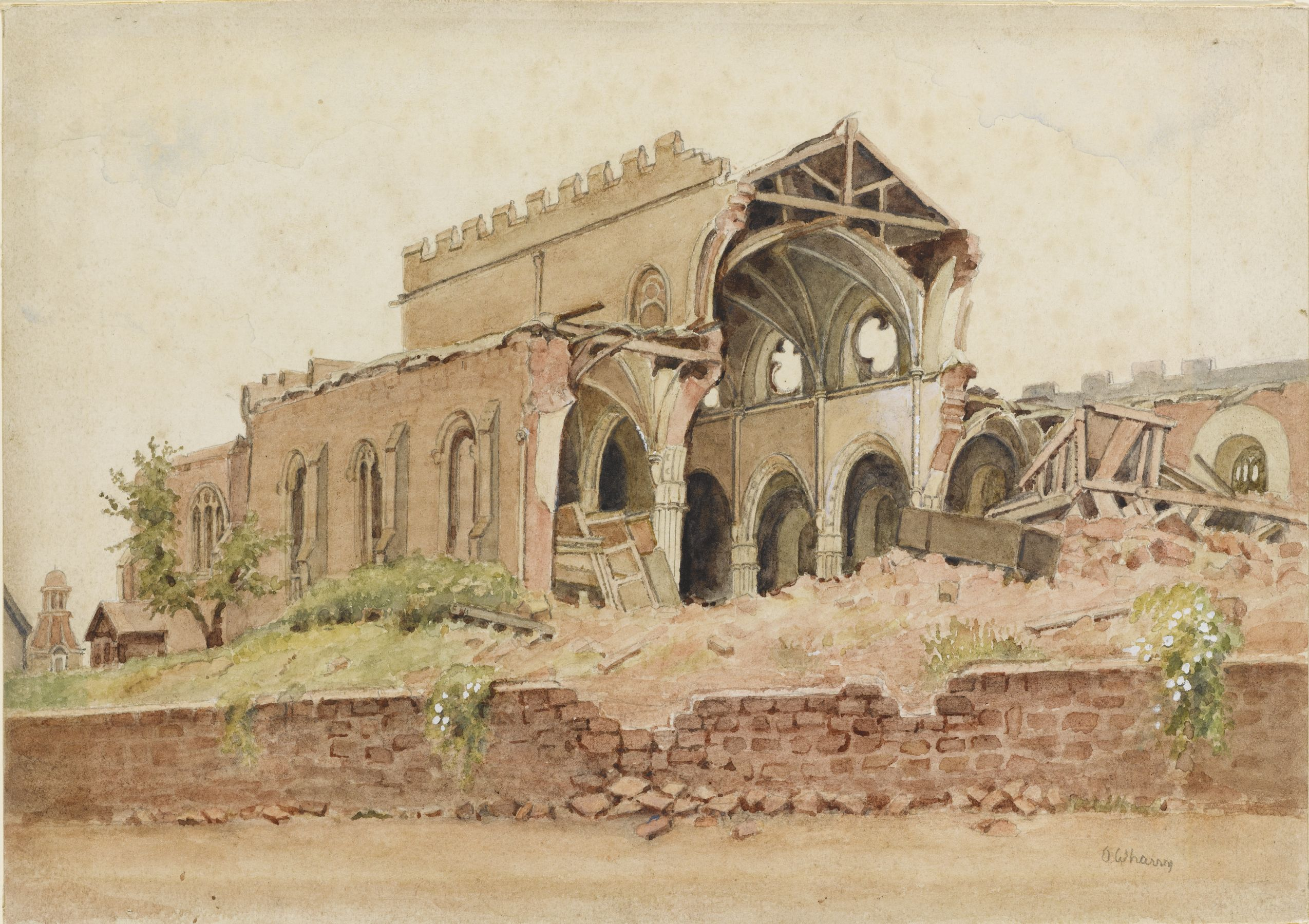
Watercolour by Olive Wharry circa 1942 of St. Sidwell’s Church, Exeter, after the Blitz. In the early hours of 4th May 1942 a 250kg bomb fell directly on St Sidwells. The church tower was left standing but was so badly damaged that it was pulled down shortly after. A replacement church was built on the site

The cultus of Sidwell has been active at Exeter from Anglo-Saxon times. Pilgrims were visiting her shrine by 1000, and their activity is mentioned both by John Leland and William Worcester. Sidwell's feast day is variously given as 31 July, 1 August or 2 August.

The Church of St Sidwell, located just outside the site of Exeter's east gate, is still extant, though it was largely rebuilt after being bombed during the Second World War. One of the main streets in Exeter is Sidwell Street.

A church at Laneast in Cornwall is dedicated to Sidwell. Here, too, is a holy well.

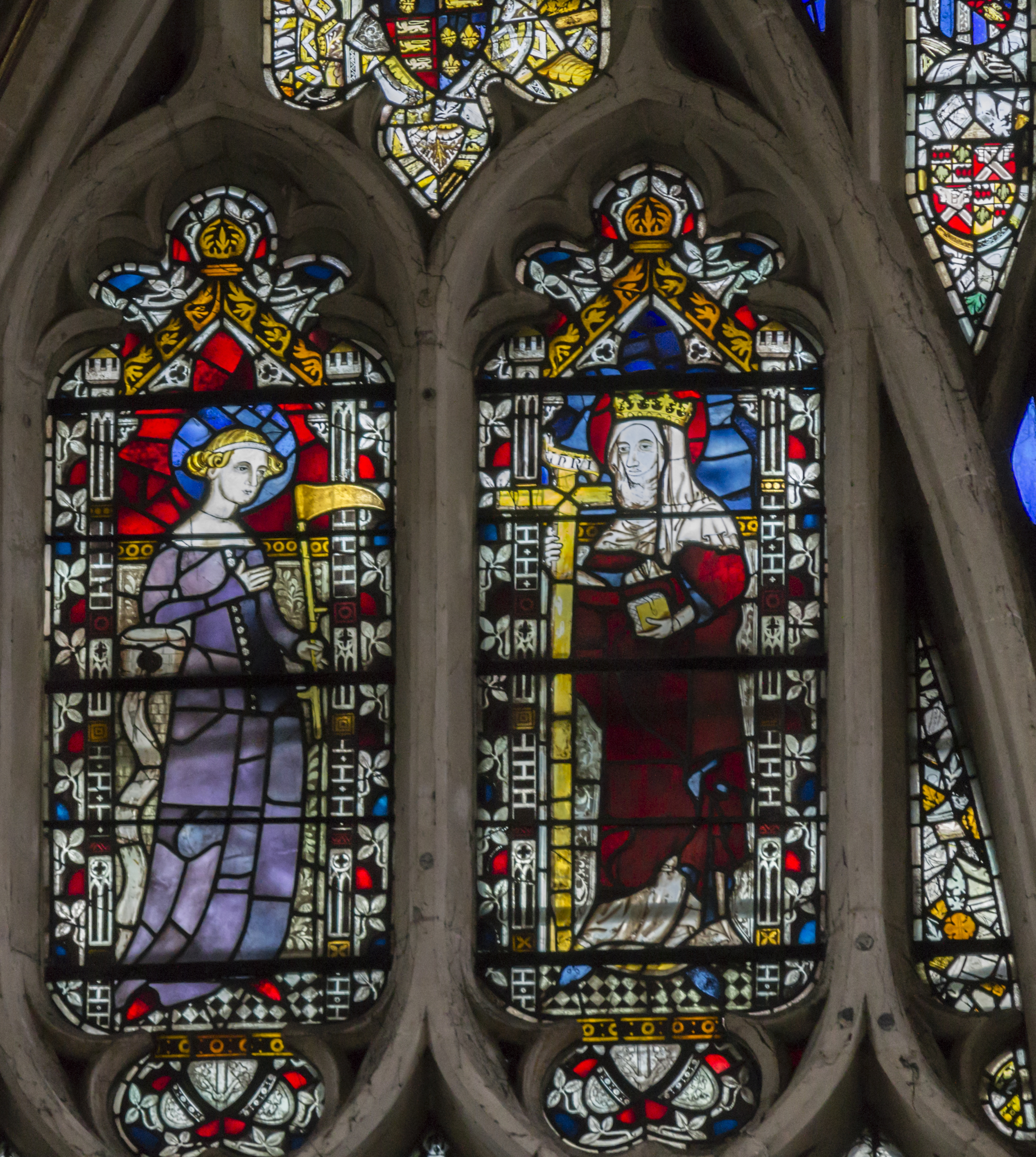
St Sidwell (left) and St Helen, Exeter

=== Iconography ===
In art, Sidwell is represented with a scythe and a well at her side. St Sidwells, formerly a village now part of Exeter, bears her name and she appears in stained glass in Exeter Cathedral as well as in the chapel at Oxford's All Souls College and the parish church of Ashton in Devon. She is also depicted on at least seven painted rood screens around the same county. There is also a statue of her in the Sacred Heart Church in South Street in Exeter.

The sculpture in Sidwell Street was created by Bideford artist Fred Irving in 1969 and is made of fibreglass.

== Sources ==
- Farmer, David Hugh (1978). The Oxford Dictionary of Saints. Oxford University Press.
