= John Zephaniah Bell =

Scottish artist

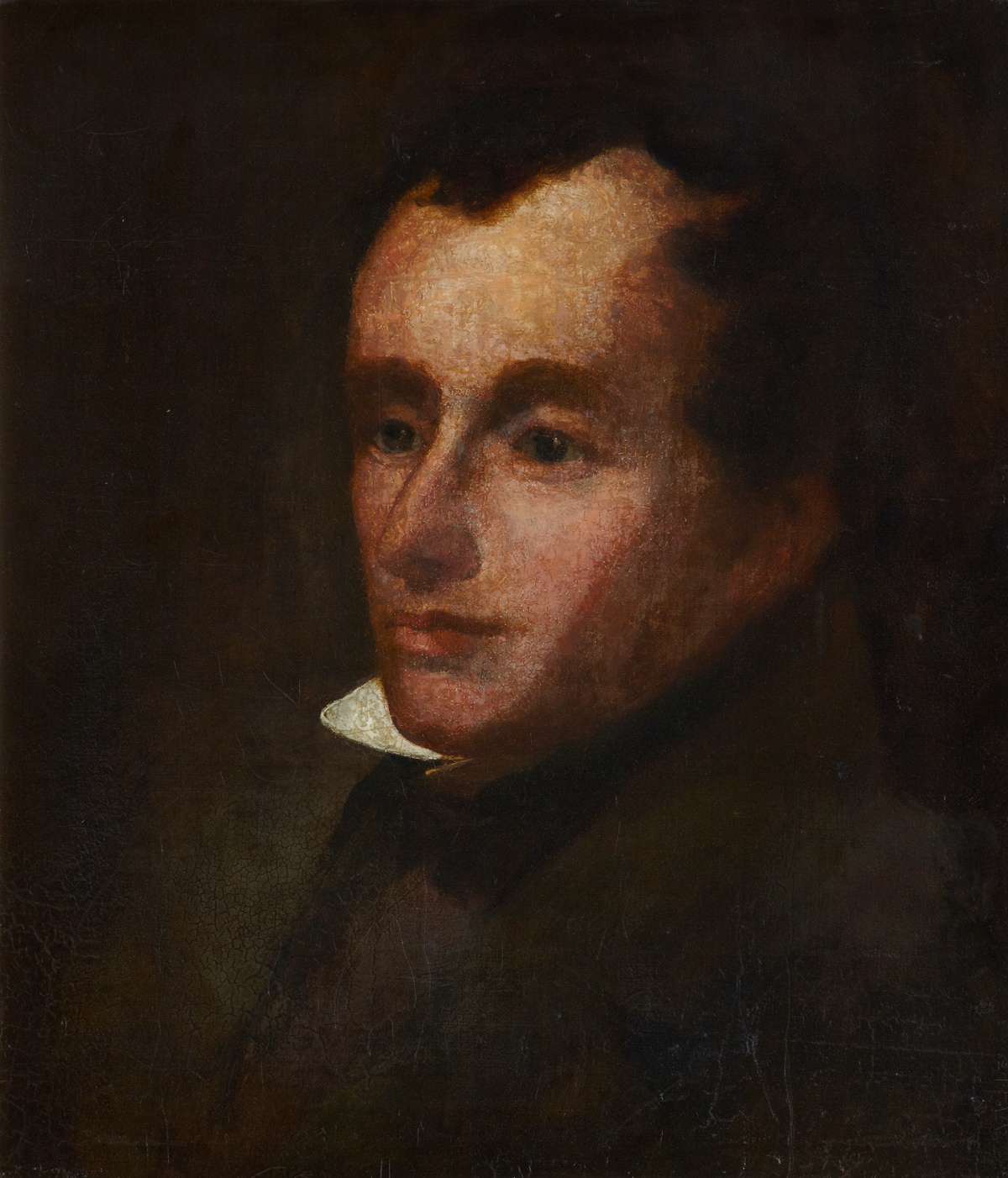
Self-portrait from the 1820s

John Zephaniah Bell (1794–1883) was a Scottish artist.

== Life ==
He was born in Dundee, where his father William Bell was a tanner, businessman and banker; James Stanislaus Bell was his brother. He studied at the University of Edinburgh, and then went to London where he was a pupil of Martin Archer Shee.

Bell studied under Antoine-Jean Gros in Paris, and was in Rome for over a year from 1825. He was portrait painter to Maria II of Portugal, and assistant to David Wilkie. He married Jane Graham Hay Campbell in 1831.

Bell became head of the Manchester School of Design when it was set up in 1838. He resigned in 1843 and was succeeded by George Wallis.

== Works ==
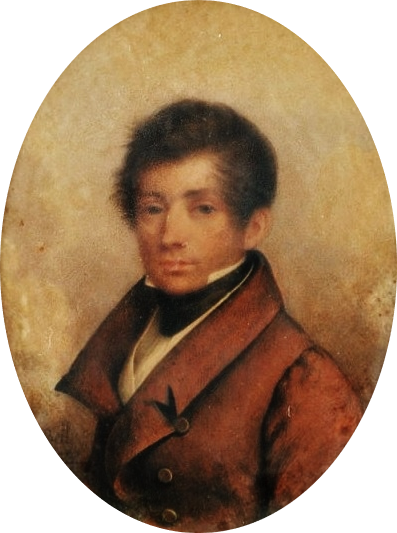
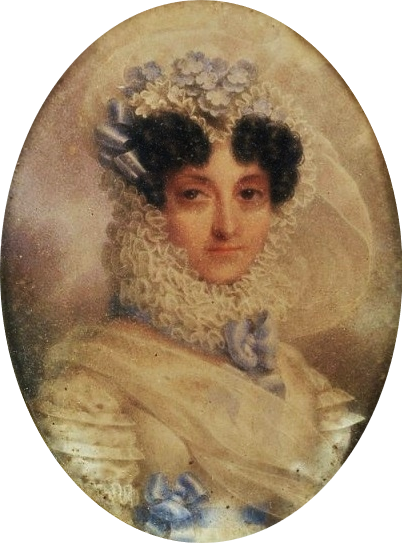
Portrait miniatures of The Count and Countess of Linhares, by John Zephaniah Bell, 1823

In Paris, Bell met David Ogilvy, 9th Earl of Airlie, who became a patron and had him decorate Cortachy Castle. He showed paintings at the Royal Academy and Royal Manchester Institution in the period 1824 to 1865. Frescoes in the Muirhouse mansion in Edinburgh impressed Wilkie. Bell won a prize in the Westminster Hall fresco competition of 1842.

Bell was a Sandemanian and painted a portrait of Michael Faraday, of the same church. The attribution to Bell of John Gubbins Newton and His Sister, Mary Newton has been withdrawn.
