= Laneast =

Village in Cornwall, England

Coordinates: 50.629°N 4.506°W

Laneast: Cornish: Lanneyst
- Location within Cornwall
- Population: 209 (Civil Parish, 2011)
- OS grid reference: SX228841
- Civil parish: Laneast
- Unitary authority: Cornwall
- Ceremonial county: Cornwall
- Region: South West
- Country: England
- Sovereign state: United Kingdom
- Post town: LAUNCESTON
- Postcode district: PL15
- Dialling code: 01566
- Police: Devon and Cornwall
- Fire: Cornwall
- Ambulance: South Western
- UK Parliament: North Cornwall

Laneast (Cornish: Lanneyst) is a village and civil parish in Cornwall, England, United Kingdom. It lies above the River Inny valley, about six miles (11 km) west of Launceston. The population in the 2001 census was 164, increasing to 209 at the 2011 census.

== Parish church ==
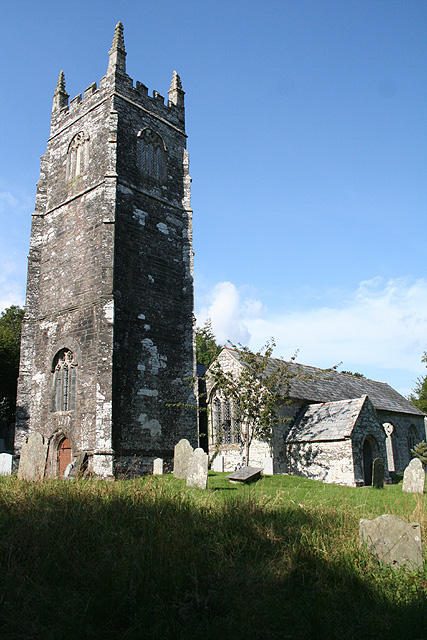
St Sidwell's church

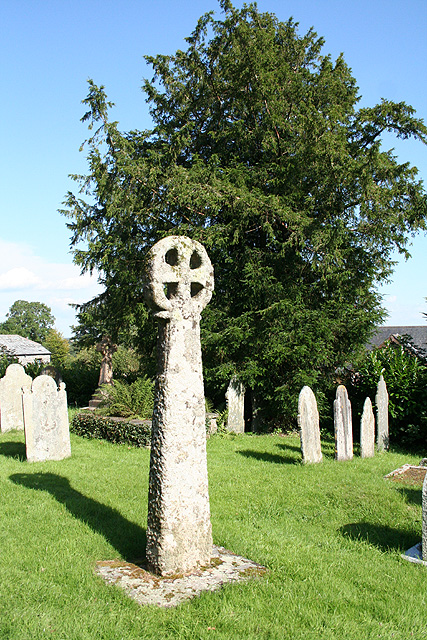
The cross in the churchyard

The parish church is dedicated to Saint Sidwell and Saint Gulval or to St Michael. The inclusion of St Gulval in the dedication is apparently due to a mistake by Dr. Oliver who understood entries referring to the church of "St Wolvela of Lanestly" as referring to Laneast whereas "Lanestly" is the old name of Gulval. The church and cemetery were dedicated in 1436; before that time burials were made at the mother church of St Stephen's. Parish land was divided between the hundreds of Lesnewth and East Wivelshire, the church being in the latter. It was founded and maintained by the Augustinian canons of St Stephen's; thereafter it became a donative served by perpetual curates.

The Norman church was cruciform and additions were made in the 13th and 14th centuries; during the 15th century the south aisle and tower were completed and the church was embellished with fine woodwork and stained glass. Though considerable restoration took place in 1848 much of the late medieval woodwork and glass remains. In a field opposite the church is the holy 'Jordan Well' used for divination, and until comparatively recently, for baptism. The Anglican benefice is united with those of Saint Clederus, St Clether, and Altarnun.

In the churchyard is a four-holed Cornish cross which was found in 1952 buried in the churchyard. The lower part of the shaft and the base were made in 1954.

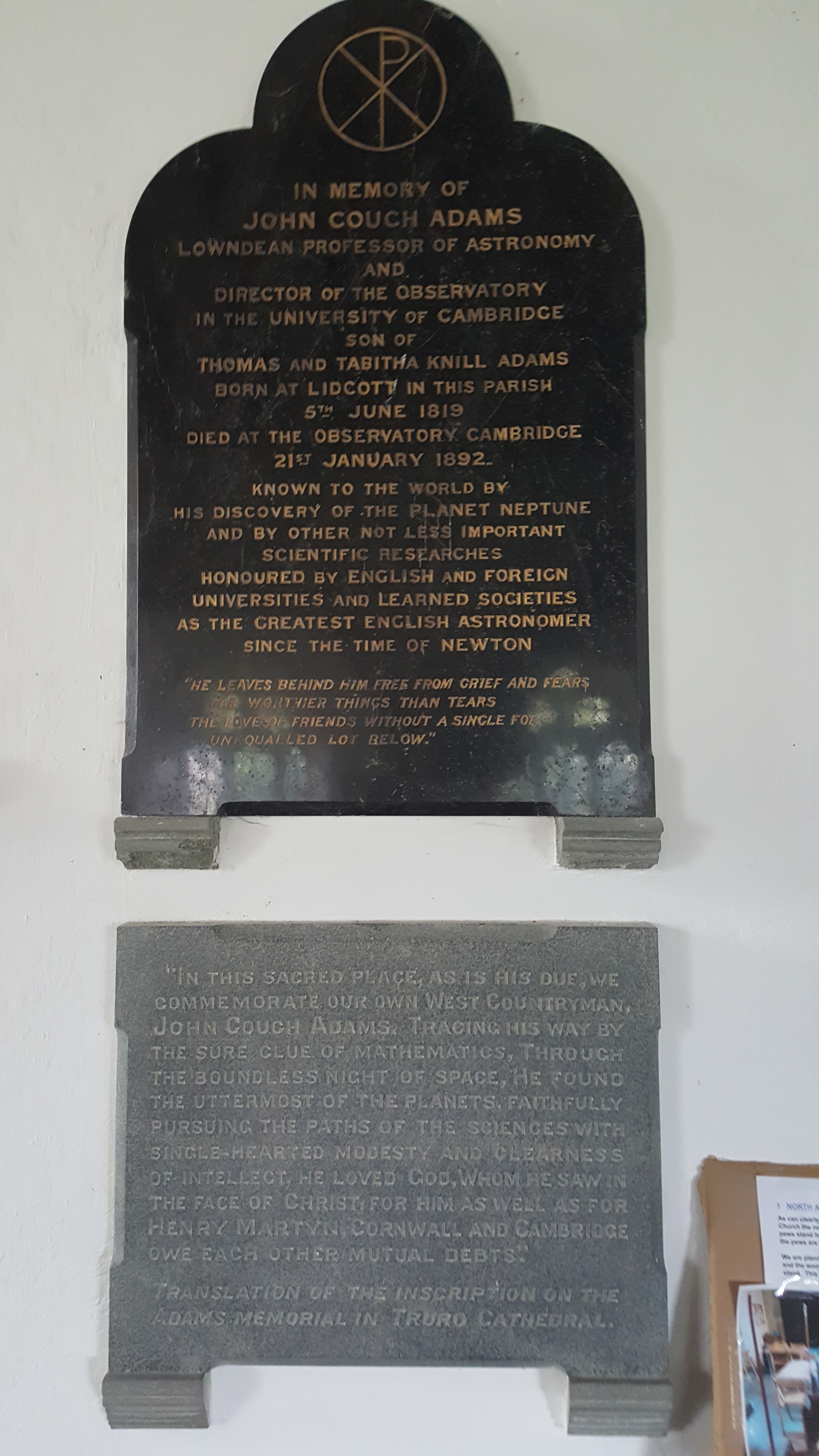
Memorial to John Couch Adams, the astronomer who discovered the planet Neptune.

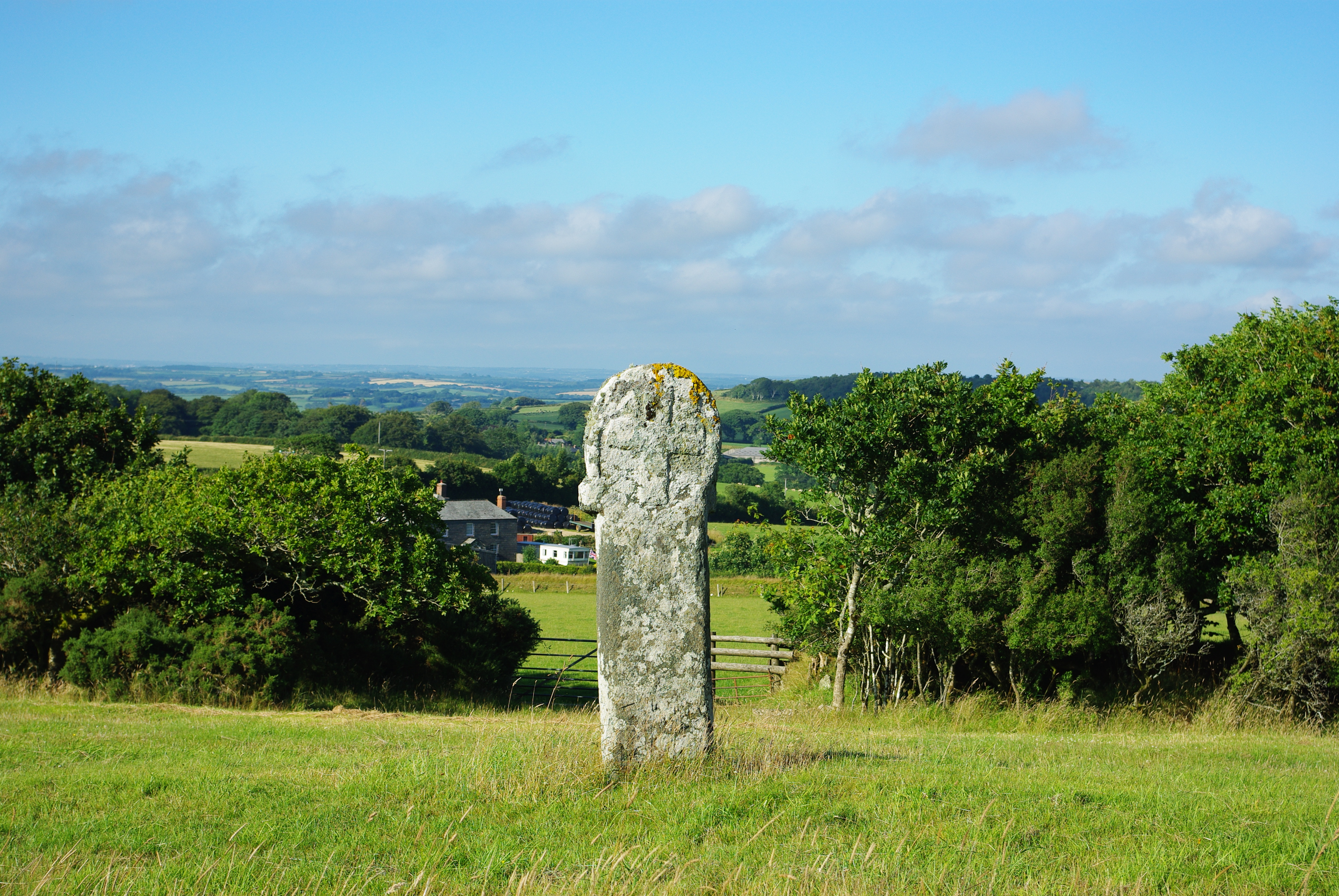
The cross on Laneast Down

There is a Cornish cross on Laneast Down. It is unusual in being made of Polyphant stone rather than granite; the two sides of the head are elliptical and have Latin crosses.

== Lidcott Mine ==
To the north-east of the parish is Lidcott Mine, a 19th-century opencast manganese mine. It is now a Site of Special Scientific Interest, noted for its geological significance.

== Notable residents ==
Laneast was the birthplace of John Couch Adams, the mathematician and astronomer who discovered Neptune, William Grylls Adams, physicist and professor of Natural Philosophy at King's College, London, and the painter Robert Burnard.
