= Tavistock (disambiguation) =

Tavistock is a town in Devon, England. It may also refer to:

== People ==
- Marquess of Tavistock, the title given to the eldest sons of the Dukes of Bedford

== Places ==
- Tavistock, Devon, England
  - Tavistock (UK Parliament constituency), a former constituency
  - Tavistock railway station, a proposed new station
  - Tavistock North railway station, a former PD&SWJR station
  - Tavistock South railway station, a former LSWR station
- Tavistock, Ontario, Canada
- Tavistock, Delaware, United States
- Tavistock, New Jersey, United States
- Tavistock Centre, a building in North London that houses the Tavistock and Portman NHS Foundation Trust
- Tavistock Square, London, England
- Tavistock MRT station, a future station in Singapore

== Organizations ==
- Tavistock and Portman NHS Foundation Trust, a mental health provider and research institute within the National Health Service in the UK
- Tavistock Clinic, a mental health therapy centre in the UK
- Tavistock College, a school in Tavistock, Devon
- Tavistock Institute, a charity concerned with group behaviour and organisational behaviour
- Tavistock Group, a large investment firm
- Tavistock Relationships, an operating unit of the Tavistock Institute of Medical Psychology, a charity involved in relationship counselling
- Tavistock A.F.C., a football club of Devon, England

== See also ==
- Bell v Tavistock, a 2020 High Court of Justice of England and Wales decision on puberty blockers
- Tawstock, a village in north Devon
