= Bere Ferrers rail accident =

1917 rail accident in Devon, England

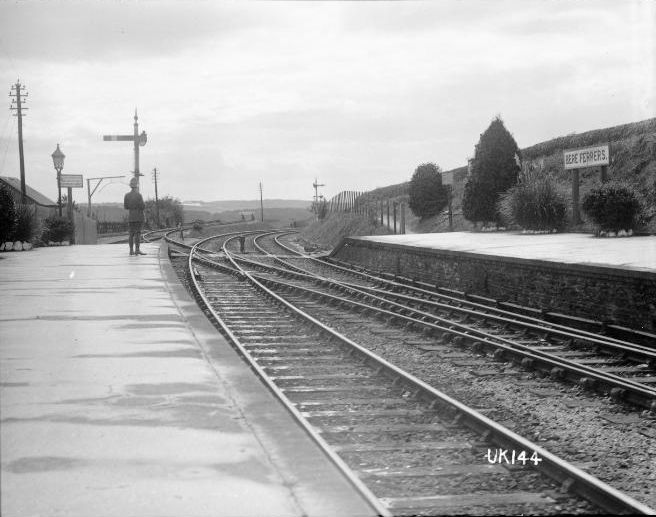
- Bere Ferrers railway station ca. 1918

Details
- Date: 24 September 1917
- Location: Bere Ferrers railway station
- Coordinates: 50.45109°N 4.18141°W
- Country: England
- Cause: Passengers' misunderstanding of operating rules

Statistics
- Deaths: 10
- Injured: 2

The Bere Ferrers rail accident occurred at Bere Ferrers railway station in England on 24 September 1917 when ten soldiers from New Zealand alighted from their troop train on the wrong side of the train, having assumed they should leave by the same side they had entered, and were struck and killed by an oncoming express.

== The accident ==
Two troopships of the New Zealand Expeditionary Force, the Ulimaroa and the Norman had just arrived at Plymouth Sound from New Zealand, and the soldiers were en route to Sling Camp on Salisbury Plain. Their train left Plymouth Friary railway station at 15:00, the soldiers had not eaten since 06:00 that morning and had been told that at the train's first stop, Exeter, two men from each carriage could collect provisions from the brake van.

In response to a signal the train made an unscheduled stop at Bere Ferrers station at 15:52. The length of the train meant that the end carriages were outside the station and those aboard assumed that this must be Exeter station. Eager to break their ten-hour fast and ignoring the 'two from each carriage' rule, many jumped down, some onto the down-line track.

The London Waterloo to Plymouth express train had left Exeter on time at 14:12 and had made its previous stop at Tavistock. As it approached Bere Ferrers the driver noticed the stationary train and gave a prolonged blast on his whistle, but there is a sharp turn on the approach to the station and the driver was unable to see the soldiers on the track ahead until it was too late.

The express was travelling at 40 mph (65 km/h) and nine soldiers were killed instantly before the express managed to come to a halt a quarter of a mile (400 m) beyond the station. A tenth died later in Tavistock Hospital. One of the survivors said "We never thought of expresses travelling at 40 miles per hour. They don't travel at that rate in New Zealand. It was a wonder more of us were not killed." The inquest revealed that the men instinctively exited the train from the same side they had entered, placing them on the railway's other track. They would also have been unaware that in Britain all stations had high platforms, unlike New Zealand and many other parts of the world where it was normal to climb down carriage steps at stations.

== Remembering the dead ==
The dead were buried in Efford Cemetery in Plymouth, but a brass tablet was unveiled in St Andrew's Church, Bere Ferrers, the year after the accident and a plaque was also erected at the station. A further plaque was unveiled in 2001 in their memory in the village centre following a request by the New Zealand National Army Museum.
