= Brent Tor =

Granite tor on Dartmoor in Devon, England

Coordinates: 50.603138°N 4.160225°W

Brent Tor (Devon)

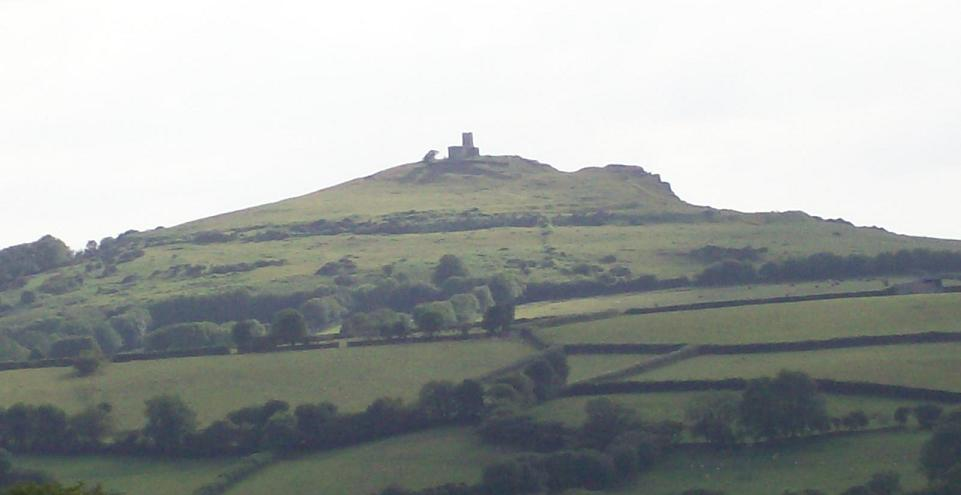
Brent Tor from the northeast

Brent Tor is a tor on the western edge of Dartmoor, approximately four miles (6.5 km) north of Tavistock, rising to 1100 ft (330m) above sea level. The Tor is surmounted by the Church of St Michael, the parish church of the village of Brentor, which lies below the Tor.

== Geology ==
Brent Tor is an unusual example of early Carboniferous basaltic volcanic rocks, now weathered down. It is composed of volcanic breccia and pillow lava exuded beneath a former sea.

== Iron Age earthworks ==
Around the Tor are Iron Age earthworks, the remnants of a Hill fort. Unusually, the fortifications are at the base of the Tor, rather than the summit as is more normal (compare with Brent Knoll in Somerset). No serious archaeological work has been carried out on the site. However, the northern ramparts in particular are well preserved, displaying a multi-vallate pattern characteristic of the Iron-A, or early -B, culture. There are three distinct consecutive ramparts in this sector, and traces of internal partitioning.

== Church ==
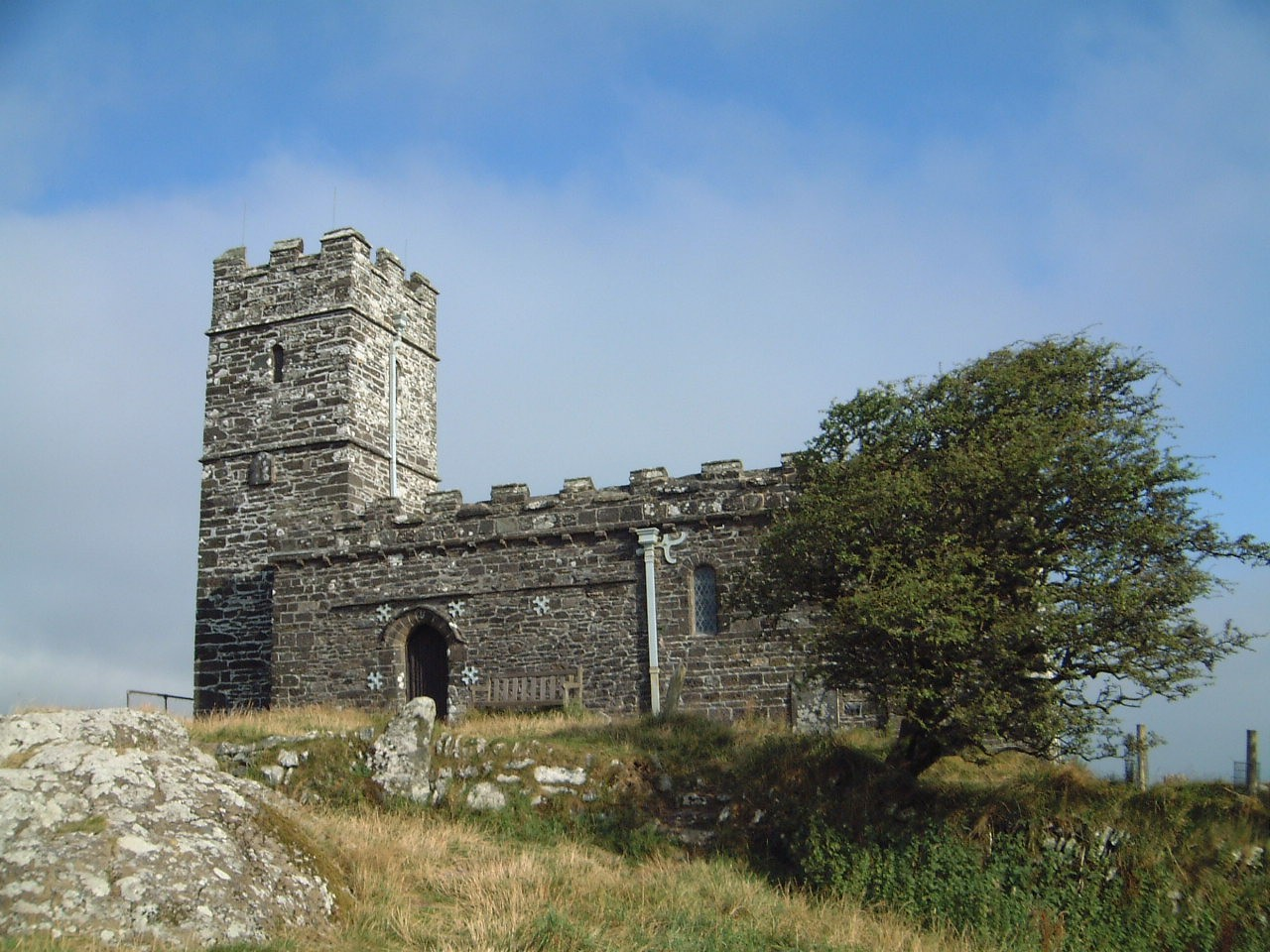
St Michael's Church, Brent Tor

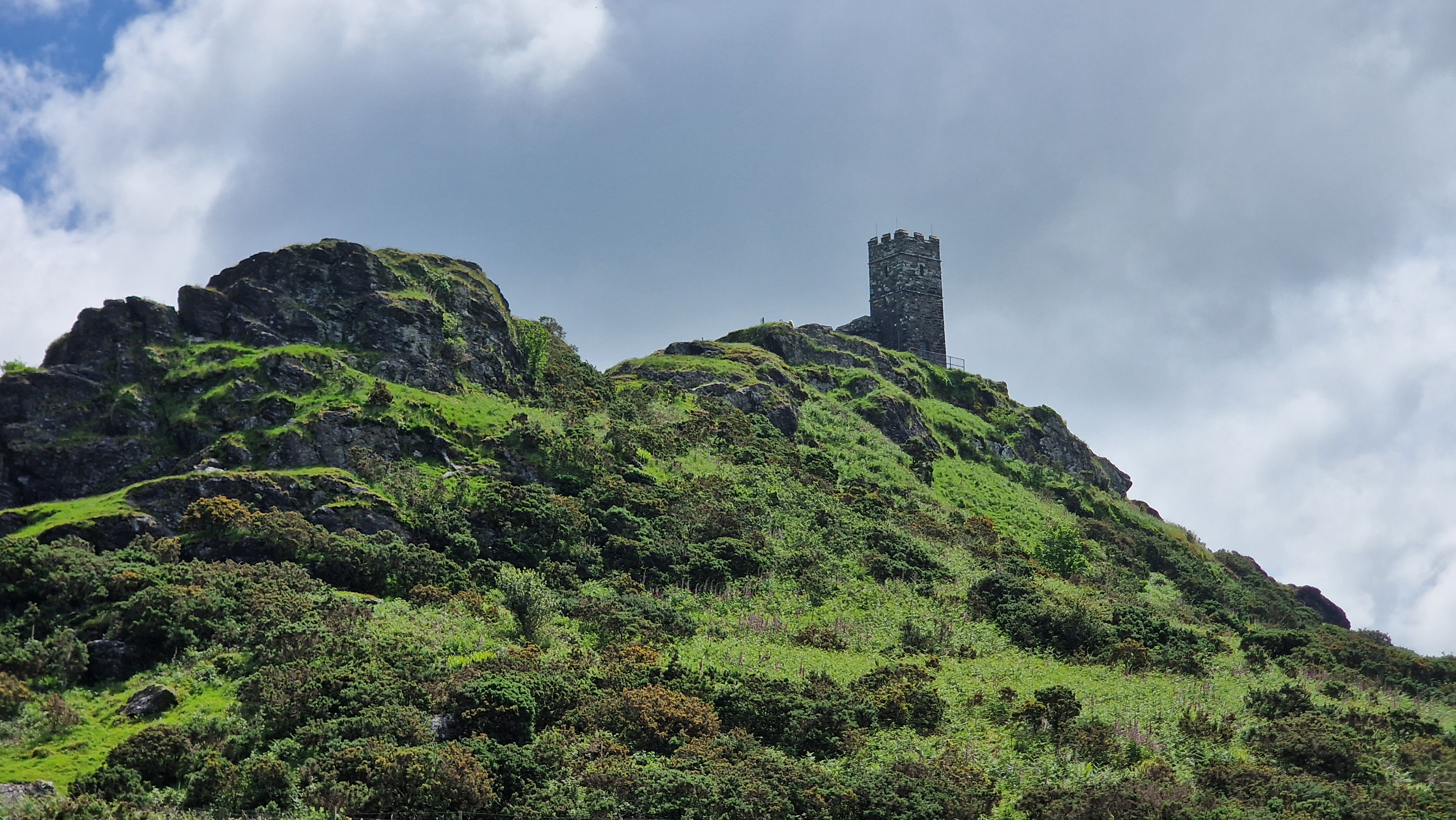
The church is very imposing looking from below

The Church of St Michel de Rupe ("Saint Michael of the Rock") atop the Tor dates to the 12th century, and measures 14 feet 6 inches (4.42 m) wide and 37 feet (11 m) long. The tower is 40 feet (12 m) high and houses five bells. At one point, the church may have been used as a Beacon tower, used to spread word of enemies seen out to sea (see also Spanish Armada). The church was rebuilt in 1319 by Tavistock Abbey. Restoration work was carried out in 1889.

It is also said that the church was to be built at the bottom of the tor, but the devil who didn't want to see its construction would move the construction to the top of the hill each night to stop its construction. Dissuaded by the devil, the locals continued with its construction in defiance.

The church has a capacity of approximately forty people. Although there is a newer (19th century) church (Christchurch) in the village, which is used for many services, St Michael's is still used on Christmas Day, Easter Day and for Evensong during the summer. In 1995 the Church was struck by lightning, which caused extensive damage, but this has since been repaired.

== Legends ==
There are many legends surrounding Brent Tor. One of the best-known is that of the Merchant and the Storm. According to this story, an early medieval merchant paid for the church to be completed after nearly being shipwrecked. The churchyard was used as a location in filming the ITV version of Jamaica Inn.
