= Bere Alston railway station =

Railway station in Devon, England

Bere Alston
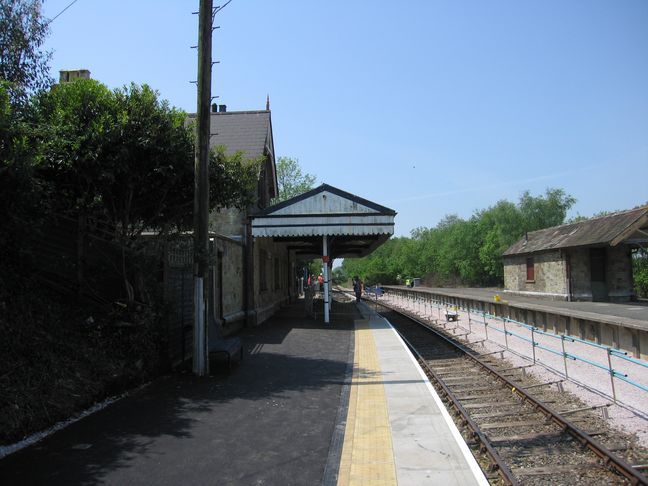
- Looking west towards the junction

General information
- Location: Bere Alston, West Devon; England
- Coordinates: 50.486°N 4.200°W
- Grid reference: SX440674
- Manager: Great Western Railway
- Platforms: 1

Other information
- Station code: BAS
- Classification: DfT category F2

Passengers
- 2021/22: ▲27,588
- 2022/23: ▲31,090
- 2023/24: ▲37,610
- 2024/25: ▲39,426
- 2025/26: ▼38,220
Location
Notes
- Passenger statistics from the Office of Rail and Road

Bere Alston railway station serves the village of Bere Alston in Devon, England, 10 1/4 miles (16.5 km) north of Plymouth on the Tamar Valley Line to Gunnislake.

The route escaped complete closure in the 1960s mainly because places on the line have relatively poor road connections. However, one section of the branch, beyond Gunnislake to Callington, did not survive.

== History ==
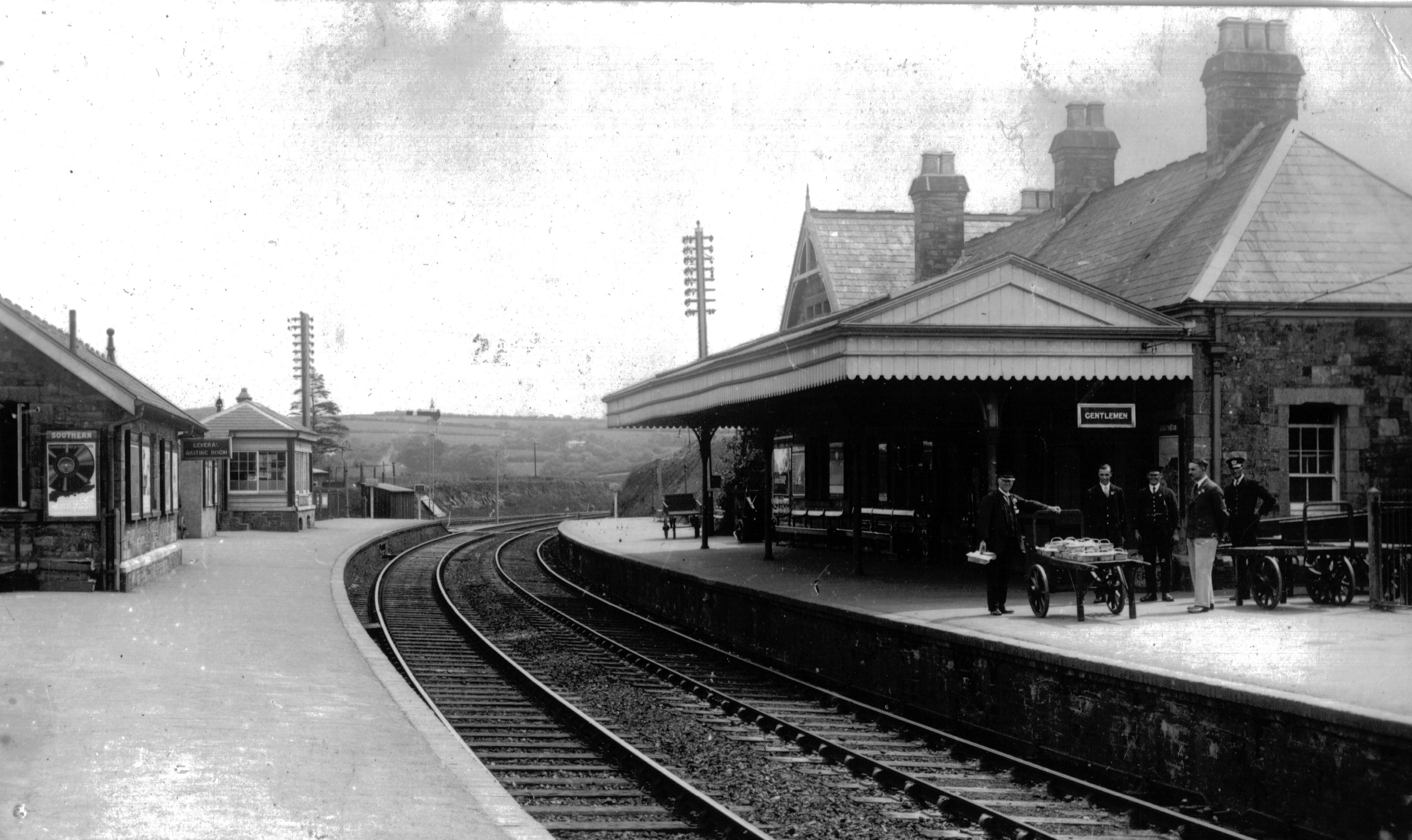
Bere Alston in 1930

Beer Alston station was opened for passengers on 2 June 1890 by the Plymouth, Devonport and South Western Junction Railway as an intermediate station on that company's line from Lydford to Devonport, which – being in effect an extension of the London and South Western Railway's main line from London Waterloo station to Lydford, enabling the LSWR to reach Plymouth independently of the Great Western Railway – was immediately leased to the LSWR. Bere Alston station was 220 miles and 15 chains (354.35 km) from Waterloo.

The station was originally called Beer Alston after the local Beer family who owned several nearby villages. However, in 1897, the railway authorities of the time decided that this name promoted an unrefined image of the village due to the association with beer, and therefore changed the name to Bere Alston in 1898.

On 2 March 1908 it became a junction, with the opening of a branch line to Callington Road. The PDSWJR became part of the Southern Railway in 1923 and British Railways on 1 January 1948.

The LSWR line from Okehampton to Bere Alston was closed in May 1968 (as a result of the Beeching Axe), which left just the Gunnislake service running through from Plymouth and reversing at Bere Alston. This had also been threatened with closure, but retained due to the local topography & poor nature of the local road network (though the last section to Callington had closed in November 1966). The line from Plymouth was reduced to just a single track on 7 September 1970 and the junction changed to allow the train guard to operate the points (using a ground frame unlocked by the branch train staff at the platform end).

== Services ==
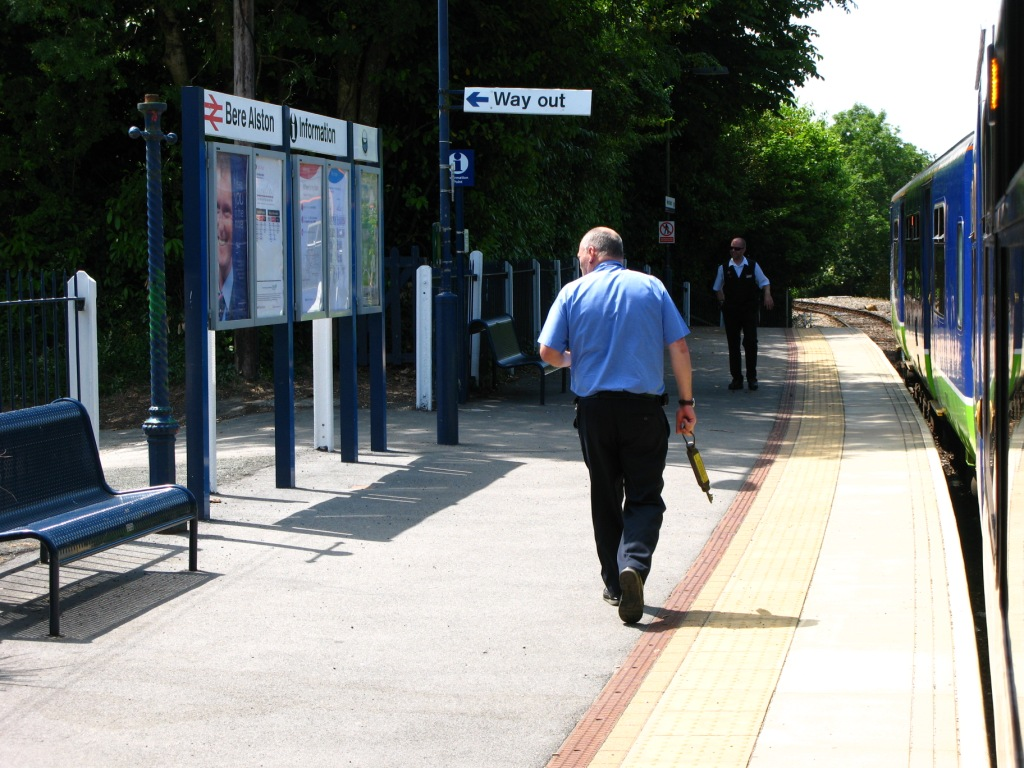
The driver changes ends ready to continue his journey towards Gunnislake.

Bere Alston is served by trains on the Tamar Valley Line from Gunnislake to Plymouth. Connections with main line services can be made at Plymouth. In 2023 there are nine services each way on Mondays to Fridays, eight on Saturdays and five on Sundays (with an extra evening trip from May to early September).

Preceding station	National Rail	Following station
Calstock towards Gunnislake	Great Western Railway Tamar Valley Line	Reverses direction
Bere Ferrers towards Plymouth	Great Western Railway Tamar Valley Line	Reverses direction
Disused railways
Bere Ferrers	British Rail Western Region Exeter to Plymouth Line	Tavistock North

== Community railway ==
The railway from Plymouth to Gunnislake is designated as a community railway and is supported by marketing provided by the Devon and Cornwall Rail Partnership. The line is promoted under the "Tamar Valley Line" name.

The Edgcumbe Hotel in Bere Alston village is part of the Tamar Valley Line rail ale trail, which is designed to promote the use of the line.

== Proposed reopening to Tavistock ==
In March 2008 Devon County Council backed a proposal by developers Kilbride Community Rail to construct 750 houses in Tavistock that included reopening the 5 1/2 miles (9 km) line from Bere Alston to a new Tavistock railway station at a cost of £18.5million. In October 2023, the government gave the go-ahead for this extension.

There have also been proposals put forward to reopen the entire route through to Okehampton and Exeter St Davids as a diversionary/relief route to maintain the rail link between Plymouth and Cornwall and the rest of the UK should the coastal main line via Dawlish be blocked by bad weather, as was the case in early 2014.
