= Burnville House, Brentor =

Historic site in Brentor, West Devon, England

Coordinates: 50°37′20″N 4°08′15″W

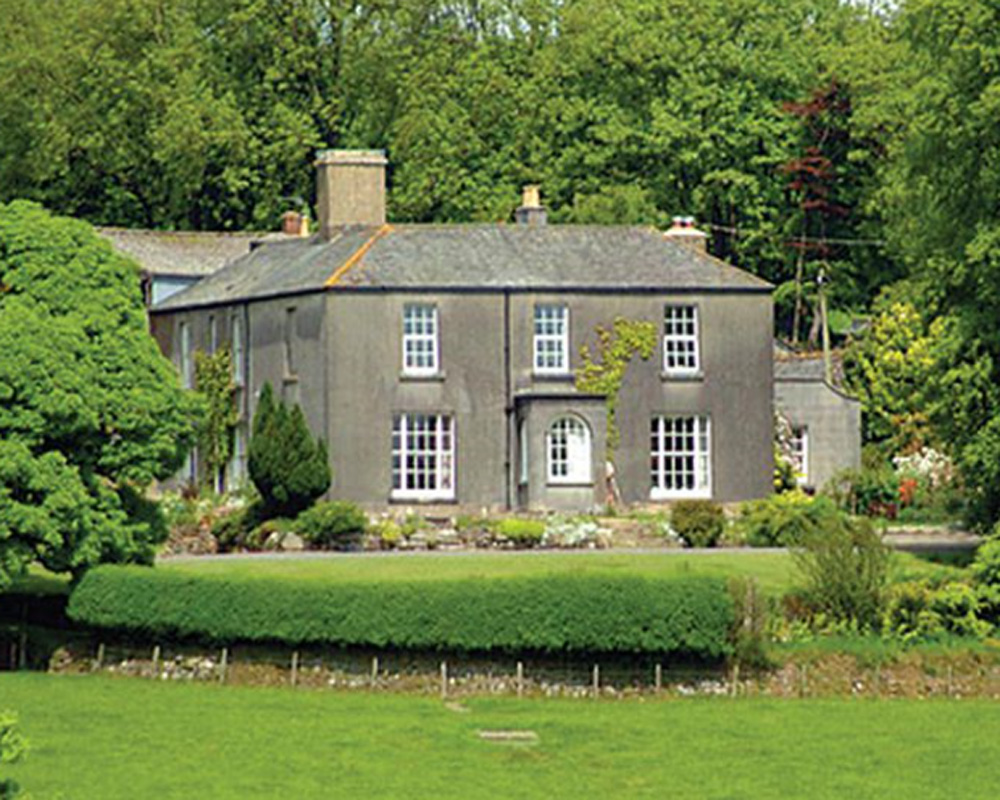
Burnville House (Farm)

Burnville House (or Farm) in Brentor, West Devon, England, is a building of historical significance and is Grade II listed on the English Heritage Register. It was built in about 1800, possibly by William Sleman, who was a wealthy landowner and described as "a gentleman". It was the home of several notable families over the next two centuries. Today it provides bed and breakfast accommodation and has self-catering cottages.

== Early owners ==
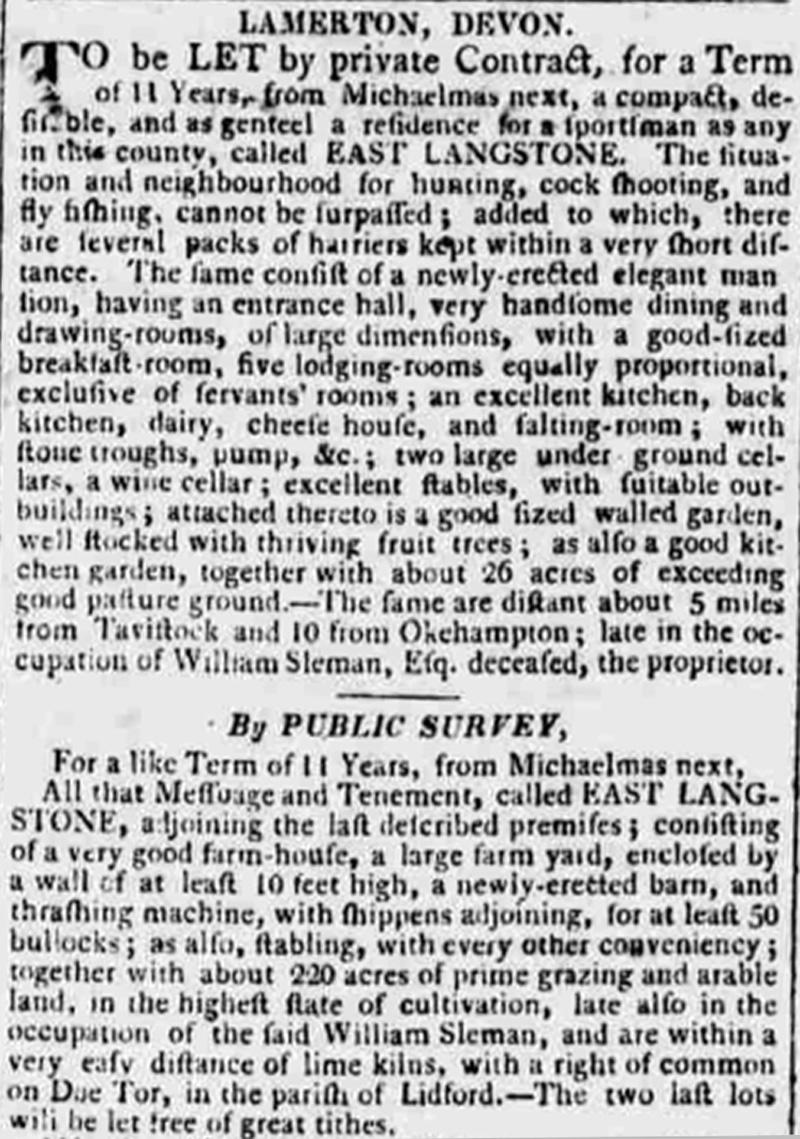
Rental notice East Langstone now Burnville 1814

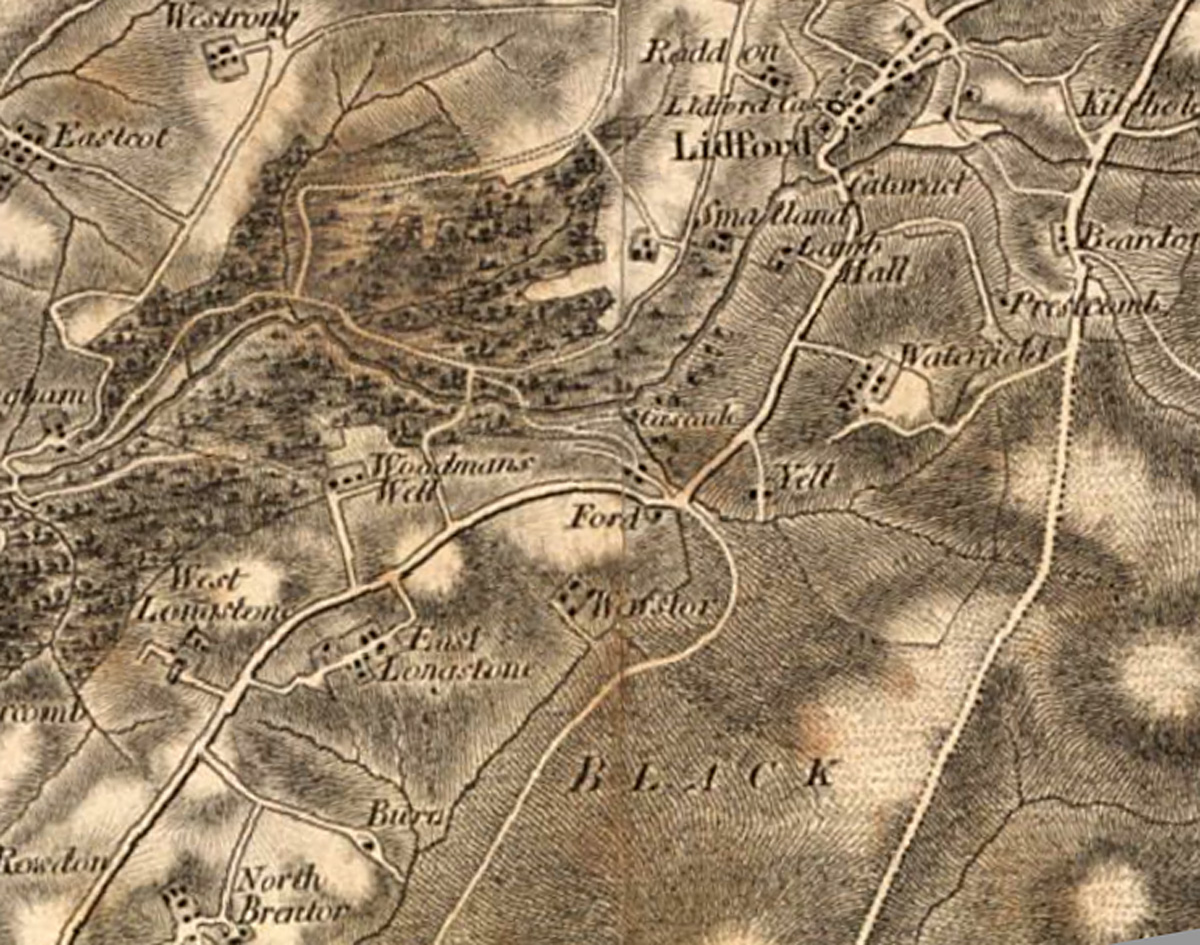
Map Brentor 1809

The map of Brentor of 1809 shows that the Burnville Estate was then called East Langstone (or Longstone). At this time it was owned by William Sleman (1780-1814) who possibly built the house. In 1802 he married Agnes Cundy (1776-1831) who was also from the parish of Lamerton and the couple had three children. Unfortunately William died in 1814. The death notice is given at this reference. In the same year the house and the nearby farm were advertised separately as rental properties. The notice is shown. The house is described in the following terms.

"It consists of an elegant mansion having an entrance hall, very handsome dining and drawing rooms of large dimensions with a good sized breakfast room, five bedrooms equally proportional (excluding servants rooms), an excellent kitchen, back kitchen, dairy, cheese house and salting room with stone troughs, pump etc. Two large underground cellars, a wine cellar, excellent stables with suitable outbuildings."

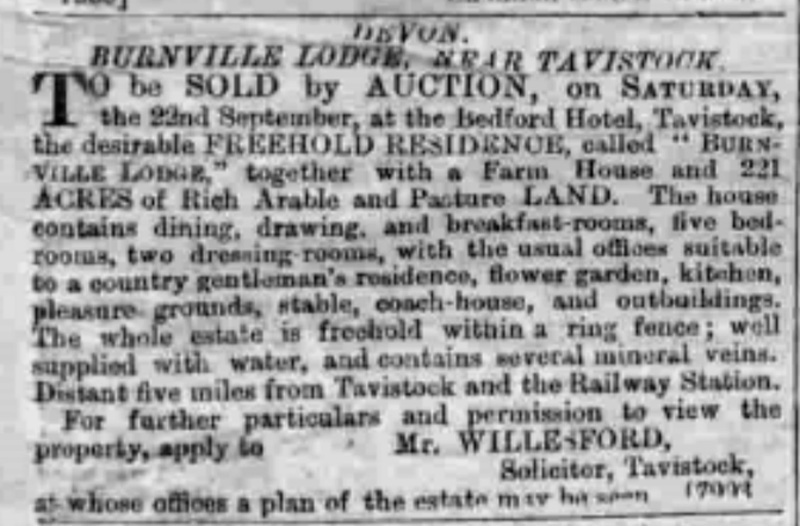
Sale notice for Burnville 1860

In 1819 the whole of William Sleman’s property was sold including East Langstone. A description of the large number of assets that he owned in the Tavistock area is given in this reference. John James and his wife Anne bought the East Langstone estate. He renamed the house “Burnville Lodge” but retained the name of the nearby East Langstone Farm. Later the whole of the estate was called Burnville.

John James (1794-1854) was part of a family listed in Burke’s Landed Gentry. He was born in 1794 and in 1815 married Anne Herring (1795-1832) who was the daughter John Pyne Herring who owned the West Langstone Estate which is shown on the above map. The couple had one son. John became the Deputy Lieutenant of Devon. Anne died in 1832 and in 1835 he married Patience Luxmoore who was the daughter of Thomas Bridgman Luxmoore of Fair Place Okehampton. They had two children. John died in 1854 and Patience continued to live at the house until 1860 when it was advertised for sale. The house was a rental property until about 1875 when it was bought by Mary Ann Ward.

== Later residents ==
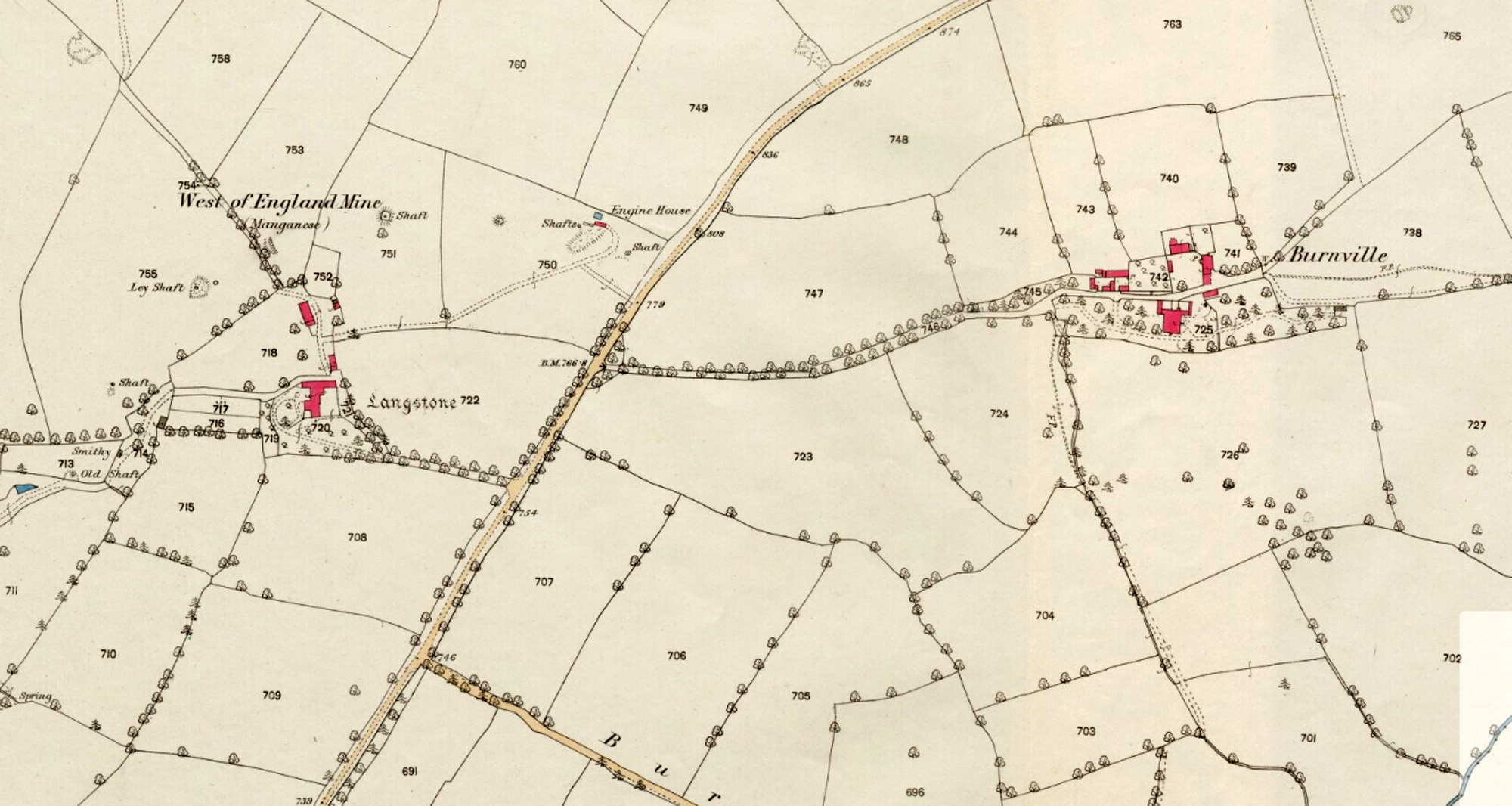
Map Burnville in 1883

Mary Ann Ward (1820-1893) was the widow of Daniel Ward who owned a property called Uppaton in Milton Abbot. He was a land surveyor and farmer. He died in 1861 and Mary Ann continued living at Uppaton and running it as a farm. She is shown in the 1871 Census at Uppaton with her three sons John, Frank and Daniel and her daughter Mary Northway Ward. In the 1881 Census she is living at Burnville and operating it as a farm of 278 acres. She is with her son Frank who is now a surveyor and auctioneer.

Frank Ward (1850-1928) was born in 1850 in Tavistock. He went into partnership with John Chowen to form the very successful firm of Ward & Chowen who were auctioneers in Tavistock. In 1911 Frank was the star in what has been described as “the sale of the century” when the lands and properties in the town belonging to the Eleventh Duke of Bedford were sold.

In 1892 he married Mary Harvey (1846-1930) from Portland Villas in Plymouth. His mother Mary Ann died in the following year in 1893 and Frank and his new bride took up residence at Burnville. Besides being an auctioneer Frank devoted much of his leisure time to cattle breeding and he won many awards. He was also a county counsellor and Justice of the Peace. The couple had no children. Frank died in 1928 and left his properties to his wife Mary. When she died in 1930 their properties were left to various relatives. Burnville was inherited by their nephew Frank Ward (1892-1969).

Frank Ward (1892-1969) was born in Tavistock Devon. His father was Daniel Ward and his mother was Mary Eliza Willion. In 1918 he married Mary Abbott Green (1896-1988), daughter of Daniel Abbott Green of Fingringhoe Hall. They lived there until the 1950s. By 1957 John L Bodman owned the property.
