= Brentor =

Village in Devon, England

Coordinates: 50°36′45″N 4°08′54″W

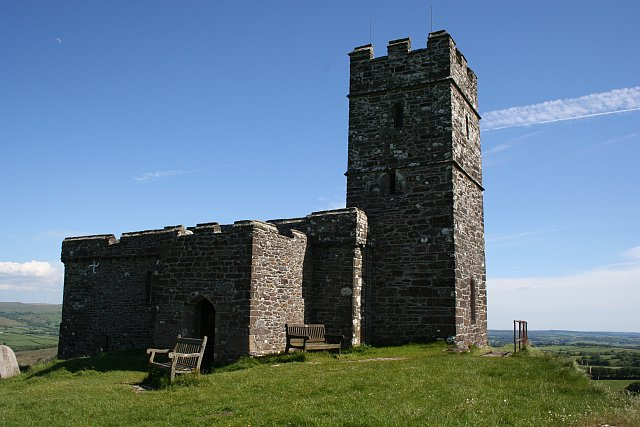
Brentor Church.

Brentor is a village in West Devon, England. Its population in 2001 was 423. The village is dominated by the hill of Brent Tor, topped by the village's church.

The origins of the name Brentor are Southwestern Brittonic, an extinct Brythonic Celtic language related to Cornish, Welsh and Breton and spoken in isolated parts of Devon until the early Middle Ages. 'Bryn' and 'tor' translate to 'hill of the rock tower'. There is a farm near Brentor, which is named Brinsabach, from 'Bryn' and 'bach', meaning 'small hill' (named after the Tor).

The village used to be part of Tavistock Hundred. Brentor railway station served the village. The topographer William Crossing was for part of his life resident at Brentor. Burnville House (or Farm) was built in about 1800 and is listed on the English Heritage Register

The parish church is St Michael of the Rock and was originally commissioned around 1130 by Robert Giffard; the lord of Lamerton and Whitchurch. It was rebuilt in 1319 by Tavistock Abbey. Restoration work was carried out in 1889.
