= Tavistock Town Hall =

Municipal building in Tavistock, Devon, England

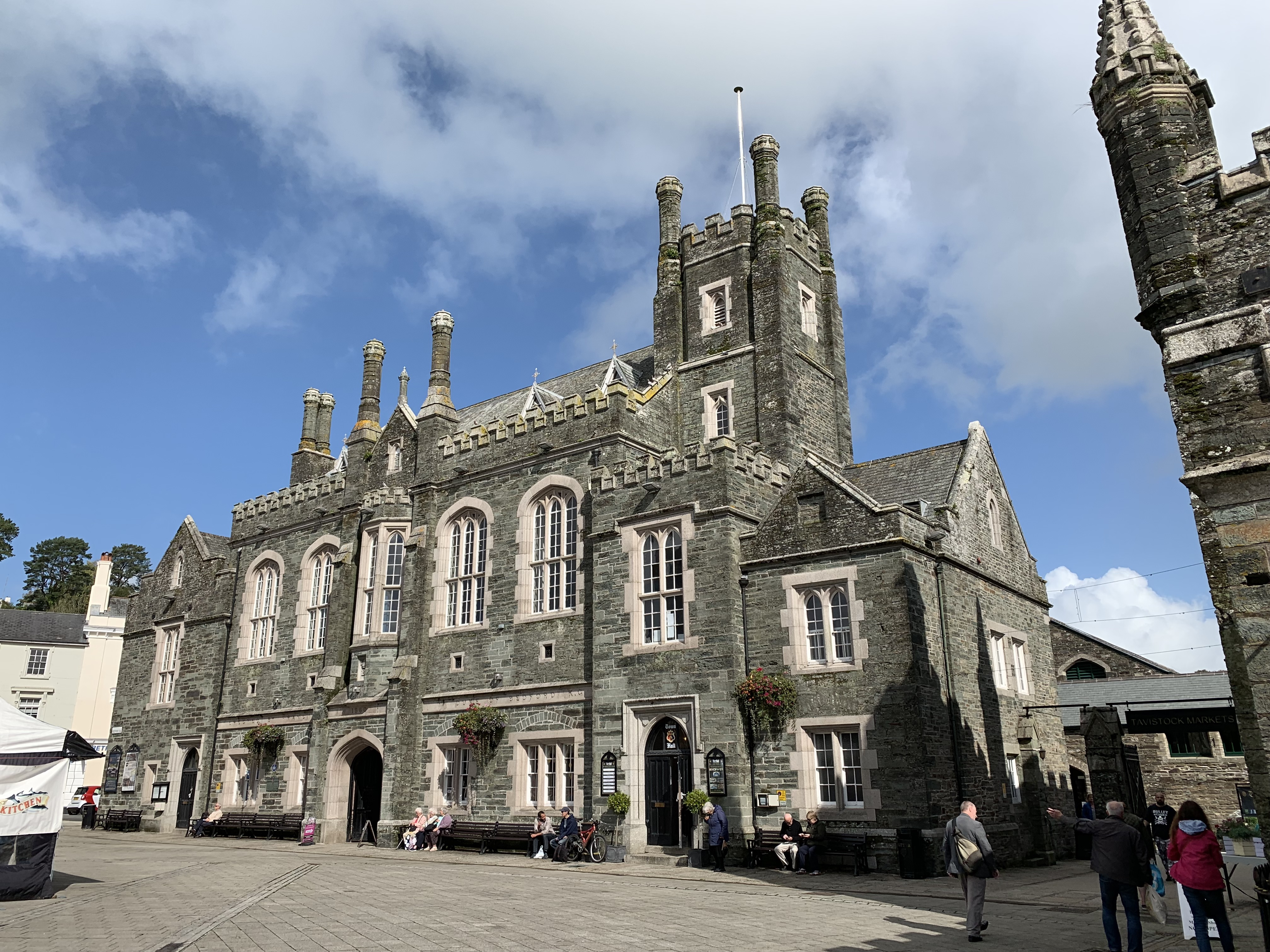
- Tavistock Town Hall

- Shown in Devon
- 50.5500°N 4.1442°W
- Location: Bedford Square, Tavistock

History
- Built: 1864

Site notes
- Architect: Edward Rundle
- Architectural style: Gothic Revival style

Listed Building – Grade II
- Official name: Town Hall
- Designated: 7 September 1951
- Reference no.: 1105832

Tavistock Town Hall is a municipal building in Bedford Square, Tavistock, Devon, England. The structure, which remains the main venue for civic events in the town, is a Grade II listed building.

== History ==
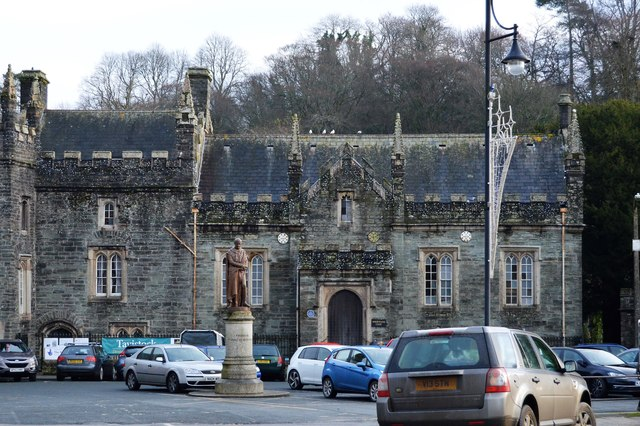
The guildhall

The first municipal building in the town was a medieval guildhall which dated back to the early 16th century: it hosted prisoners of war from the Parliamentary Army in harsh conditions in 1644 during the English Civil War. After the old guildhall became seriously dilapidated, a new guildhall was commissioned by Francis Russell, 7th Duke of Bedford as part of a broader initiative to remodel the town centre: it was designed by John Foulston for use as a courthouse and police station as well as a prison and was completed in 1848. In the mid-1850s the duke decided to extend his initiative by erecting a municipal structure for civic events: the site he chose, which lay to the northwest of the guildhall, was occupied by a residential area bounded by Mathew Street, Lower Brook Street and Lower Market Street.

The new building was designed by Edward Rundle in the Gothic Revival style, built in locally quarried stone and was officially opened on 2 February 1864. The design involved an asymmetrical main frontage with five bays facing onto Bedford Square; the central bay featured an arched carriageway on the ground floor with a prominent oriel window and a gable above. The other bays were fenestrated with mullioned windows on the ground floor and large round headed windows on the first floor. At roof level, there was a crenelated parapet and four dormer windows. There was also a four-stage crenelated tower to the southeast of the main section. Internally, the principal rooms were the main hall, which was panelled and featured a maple floor, and the mayor's parlour.

The borough council, which had not met for many years, was abolished under the Municipal Corporations Act 1883. However, following a significant increase in population, largely associated with the status of Tavistock as a market town, the area became an urban district in 1898. The council used the town hall as a venue for civic events and located the council officers and their departments at purpose-built council chambers in Drake Road which were completed in the late 19th century. The Russell family sold various properties in the town, including the guildhall, the town hall, the council chambers and various public amenities, including the corn market, to the urban district council for a price agreed by arbitration in order to meet death duty obligations in 1913.

After the Plymouth Blitz, a series of bombing raids carried out by the Luftwaffe on Plymouth during the Second World War, the town hall was used as peripheral rest centre for Plymouth residents displaced by the destruction. Then, in December 1943, soldiers of the 29th Infantry Division of the United States Army, who were preparing for Operation Overlord, hosted a party in the town hall for children from the Plymouth Road Primary School. Significant visitors included the future Deputy Prime Minister, Michael Heseltine, who delivered a speech in the town hall in January 1966 as part of his successful campaign to be elected the local member of parliament in the 1966 general election.

Works of art in the town hall include a series of portraits by Lady Laura Russell, the wife of Lord Arthur Russell; the subjects of these portraits include the 4th, 6th and 7th Dukes of Bedford, the local members of parliament, John Pym, Sir John Salusbury-Trelawny, George Byng and Hugh Luttrell, and the naval and military commanders, Sir Francis Drake and Colonel John Russell.
