= Brentor railway station =

Disused railway station in Devon, England

Coordinates: 50.61038°N 4.14127°W

Brentor
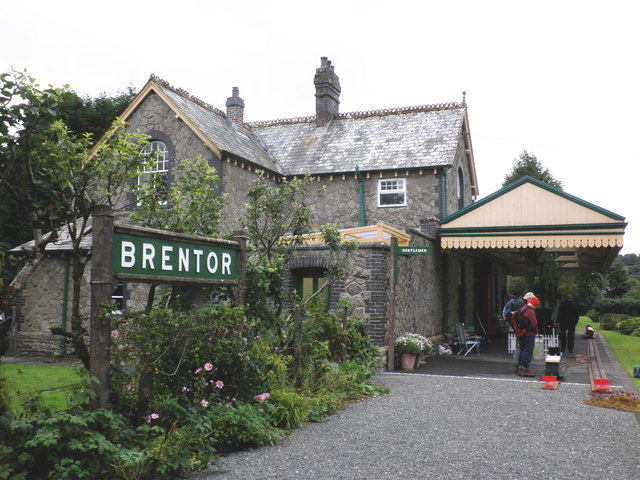
- Brentor railway station in 2009

General information
- Location: Brentor, West Devon; United Kingdom
- Platforms: 2

Other information
- Status: Disused

History
- Opened: 1 June 1890
- Closed: 6 May 1968
- Pre-grouping: Plymouth, Devonport and South Western Junction Railway
- Post-grouping: Southern Railway
Location

Brentor railway station used to serve the village of Brentor in Devon, England. It was on the Plymouth, Devonport and South Western Junction Railway's line from Lydford to Plymouth, between Lydford and Tavistock.

== History ==
It opened on 1 June 1890 and closed on 6 May 1968.

After closure and the track was removed, the space between the platforms filled in and the station building converted to a private house.

| Preceding station | Disused railways | Following station |
|---|---|---|
| Tavistock North | British Rail Western Region Exeter to Plymouth Line | Lydford |
