= Bere Alston =

Village in Devon, England

Coordinates: 50.483333°N 4.2°W

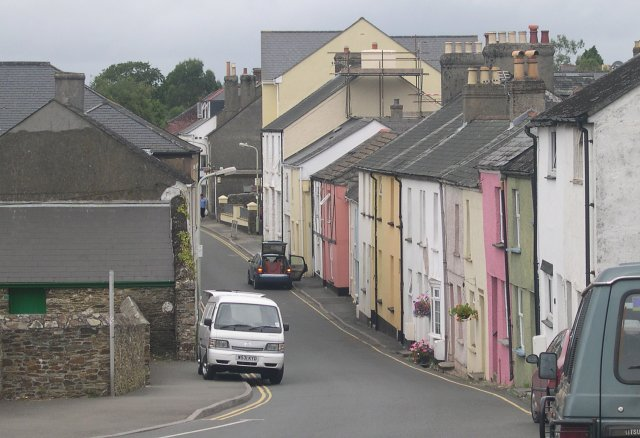
- Bere Alston

- Location within Devon
- OS grid reference: SX4466
- Civil parish: Bere Ferrers
- District: West Devon
- Shire county: Devon
- Region: South West
- Country: England
- Sovereign state: United Kingdom
- Post town: YELVERTON
- Postcode district: PL20
- Dialling code: 01822
- Police: Devon and Cornwall
- Fire: Devon and Somerset
- Ambulance: South Western
- UK Parliament: Torridge and Tavistock

Bere Alston is a historic village on the Bere Peninsula in West Devon, England, situated between the rivers Tamar and Tavy within the Tamar Valley National Landscape. Historically associated with silver and lead mining, the village later developed through market gardening and railway transport, and was formerly a parliamentary borough returning two Members of Parliament until the Reform Act 1832. The village forms part of the civil parish of Bere Ferrers and had a population of 2,259 at the 2021 Census.

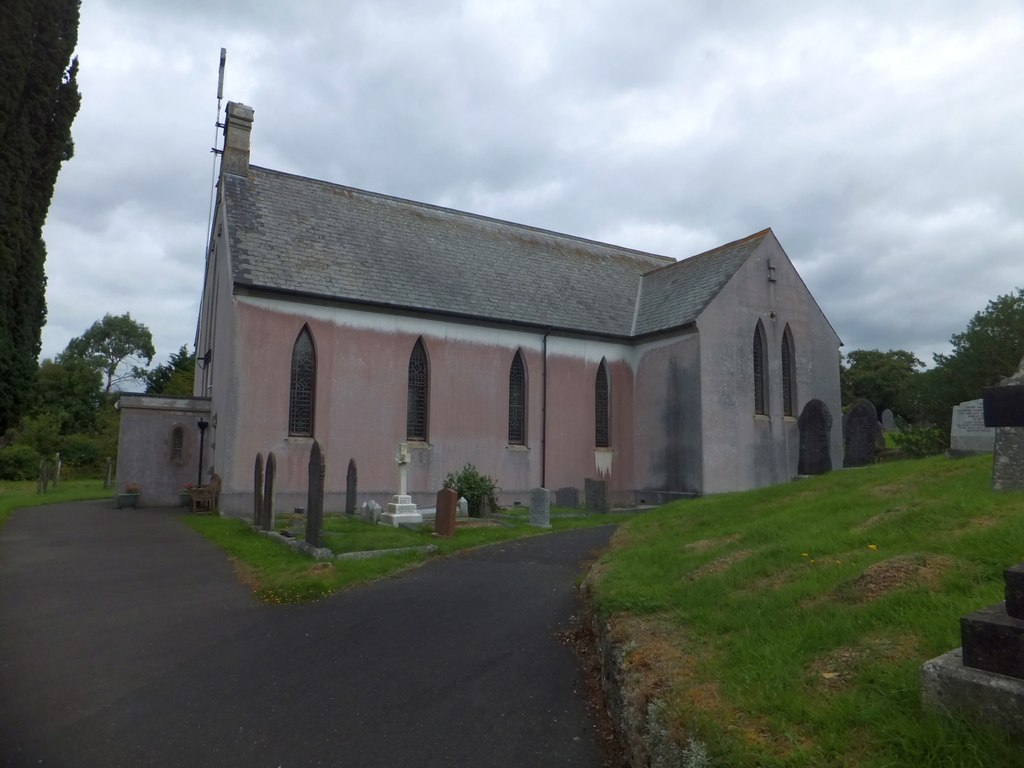
Holy Trinity Church

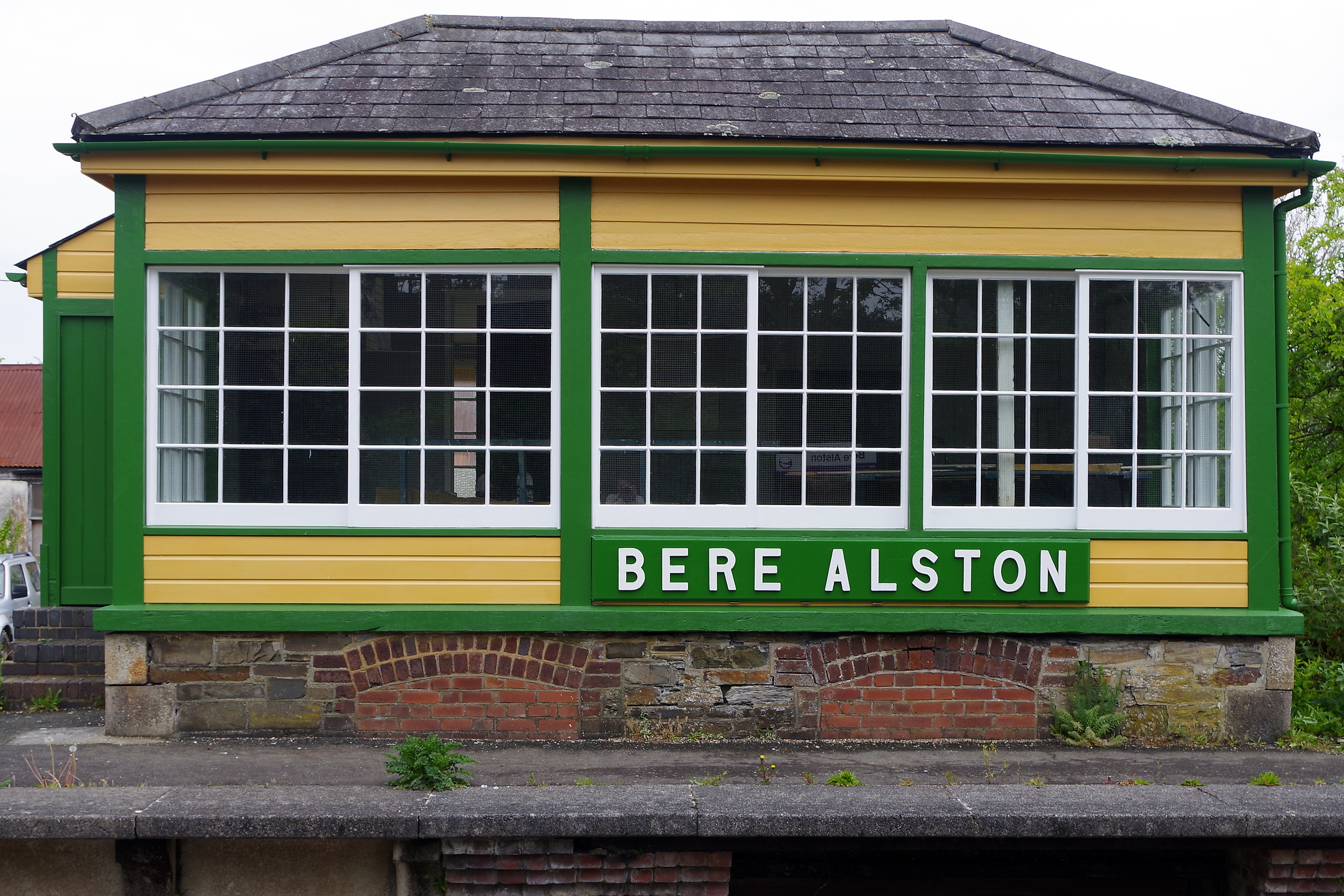
Signal box at Bere Alston Train Station

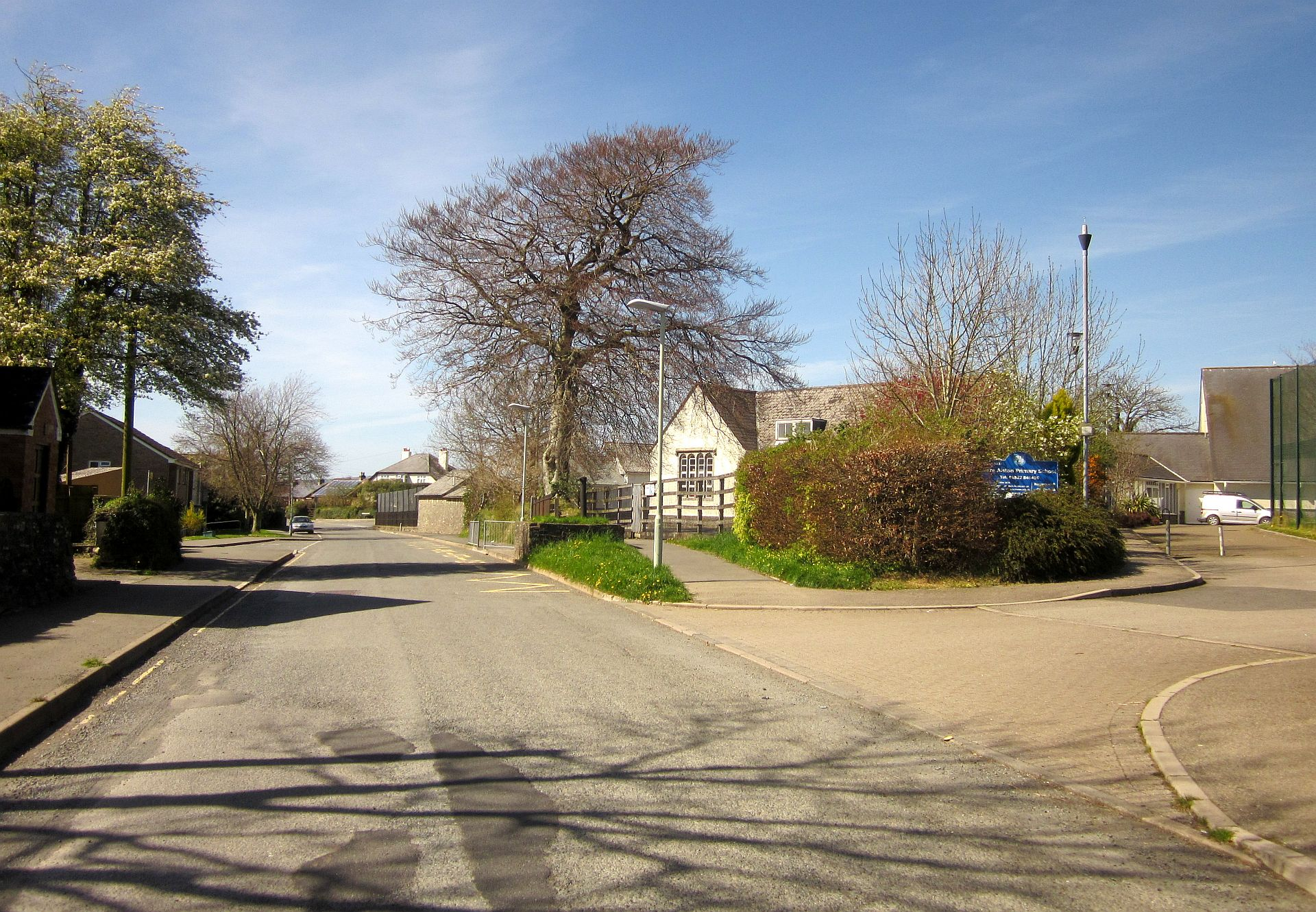
Bere Alston School

== History and geography ==
With a population of about 2,259 (2021 Census), the village lies in the Bere peninsula, between the rivers Tamar and Tavy. Its origins lie in the once thriving local mining industry, including silver and lead, and the market gardening sector. At one time, the mainline trains to London would stop at the village to pick up locally grown produce destined for the capital.

Bere Alston is about 12 km north of the centre of Plymouth as the crow flies, but the road trip requires either a long detour via Tavistock or else negotiating narrow lanes and a narrow bridge.

Trains still run to Bere Alston railway station on the picturesque Tamar Valley Line between Plymouth and Gunnislake, and trains reverse at this station. There has been discussion of making the station a junction once again by reopening the former 'main line' to Tavistock, the largest town in Devon currently without a railway station. Occasionally, the reopening of the line through to Okehampton and Exeter is suggested, since the current Plymouth to Exeter route is dependent on an extremely vulnerable route below the sea cliffs at Dawlish Warren.

Bere Alston elected two members to the unreformed House of Commons. Only a few burgage holders were entitled to vote; but as most, if not all, of these holdings were held by a single individual for most of the time that Bere Alston was a parliamentary borough, elections were seldom contested (see rotten borough). Its MPs included Sir George Beaumont, 7th Baronet, Peter King, 1st Baron King and Josceline Percy. The borough was stripped of its franchise in the Reform Act 1832.

Once home to numerous pubs, the village now only has one public house, The Edgcumbe Hotel, on Fore Street, which at one time was also a jail and later a schoolhouse. Also on Fore Street is a Co-Op, Premier, Post-Office, and a Butchers. There is also a modern cafe, Hope Cottage, located next door to Bere Alston United Church.

The village is surrounded by woodland and fields.

== Architecture ==
The village is notable for having one of the oldest primary schools in Devon, Maynard's School. Erected by Sir John Maynard in 1665, the original building still forms part of the primary school today (the date is carved on a porch above the original red doorway).

The Bere Alston United Church on Fore Street was built in 1811. The Anglican church of the Holy Trinity was built in 1848.

== Sport ==
Bere Alston United Football Club is a member of the Devon Football Association. The 1st team play their matches in the East Cornwall Premier Division. and are managed by Kevin Taylor.

There are four pool teams playing in the Winter Tamar Valley Pool League. from Bere Alston.

From the Edgcumbe Hotel: The Edgcumbe 'Aces' – Division 2 & The Edgcumbe 'B' – Premier Division (Division 1 Champions 2009–2010)

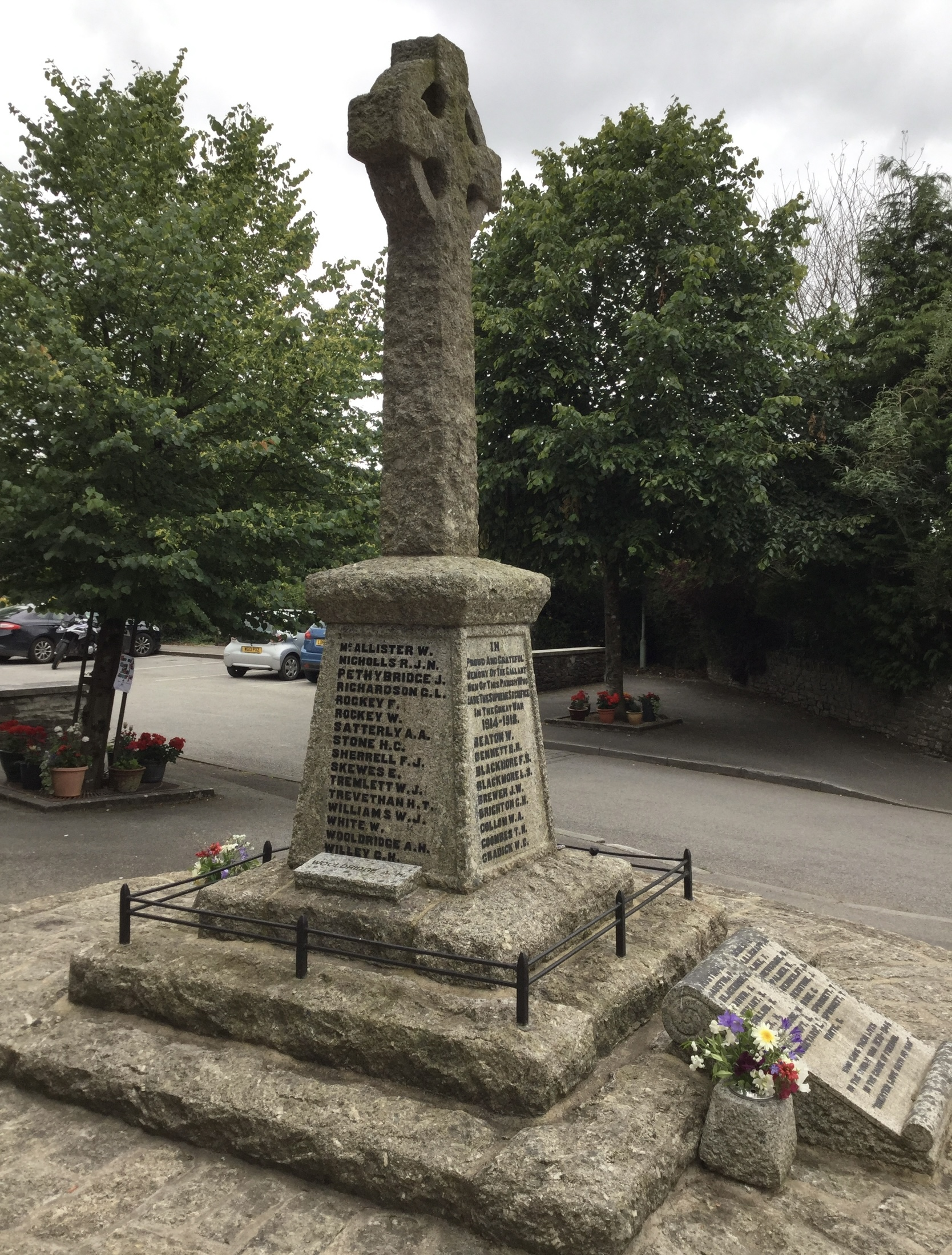
Station Road War Memorial

There is also a lawn bowling club in the village, playing in many leagues in Devon. The club is visited by many touring teams throughout the season.

== Notable people ==
- William Mitford (1744–1827), an English historian, landowner, politician and local MP 1796–1806.
- Josceline Percy [1784–1856), a Royal Navy officer, politician and local MP, 1806-1818.

== See also ==
- Bere Alston (UK Parliament constituency)
- Bere Alston railway station
