= Corn Market, Tavistock =

Commercial building in Devon, England

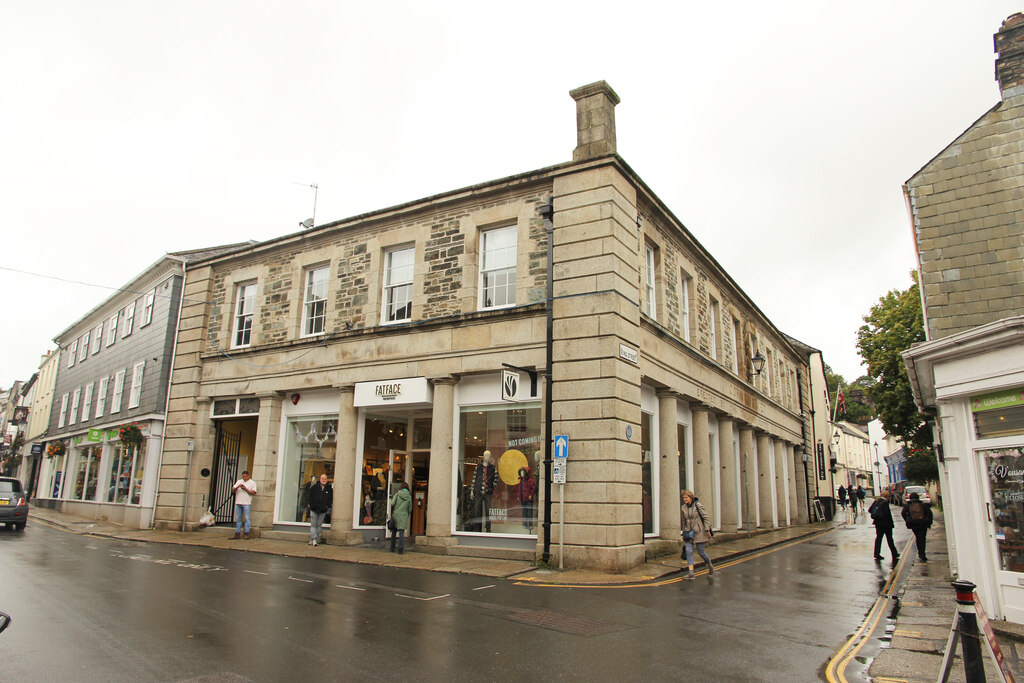
- Corn Market, Tavistock

- Shown in Devon
- 50.5499°N 4.1462°W
- Location: West Street, Tavistock

History
- Built: 1835

Site notes
- Architect: Charles Fowler
- Architectural style: Neoclassical style

Listed Building – Grade II
- Official name: Cook Stores (Hardware)
- Designated: 30 May 1977
- Reference no.: 1163573

The Corn Market is a commercial building in West Street in Tavistock, Devon, England. The structure, which is now used as a ladies' clothes shop, is a Grade II listed building.

== History ==
The building was commissioned by the local land-owner, John Russell, 6th Duke of Bedford. The site he selected, on the corner of West Street and King Street, was occupied by the Green Dragon Inn.

The new building was designed by Charles Fowler in the neoclassical style, built with ashlar stone facings on the ground floor and with rubble masonry on the first floor, and was completed in 1835. The design involved a long main frontage of eight bays facing onto King Street. The ground floor was originally open, and the bays were separated by Doric order columns carved from granite supporting an entablature carved with the words "Corn Market, Erected by John, Duke of Bedford, K. G., 1835". The first floor was fenestrated by sash windows with architraves, and above, there was a hipped slate roof. The West Street frontage of four bays adopted a similar style.

The use of the building as a corn exchange declined significantly in the wake of the Great Depression of British Agriculture in the late 19th century. The building was then re-purposed as Walford's Cinema Palace under the management of a Mr. C. Walford in 1912, and a 18 feet (5.5 m) wide proscenium arch was installed. The Russell family sold various properties in the town, including the guildhall, the town hall, the council chambers and various public amenities, including the corn market, to the urban district council for a price agreed by arbitration in order to meet death duty obligations in 1913.

In the early 1920s, the facility was branded simply as "Cinema". After the Second World War, it came under the management of Archie Lewis Cinemas of Dawlish but it closed in 1963. It went on to become a hardware store known as "Cook Stores" in the 1970s. After being refurbished by Wessex Heritage in the early 1990s, it become as a ladies' clothes shop operating under the FatFace brand.

== See also ==
- Corn exchanges in England
