= Bere Ferrers railway station =

Railway station in Devon, England

Bere Ferrers
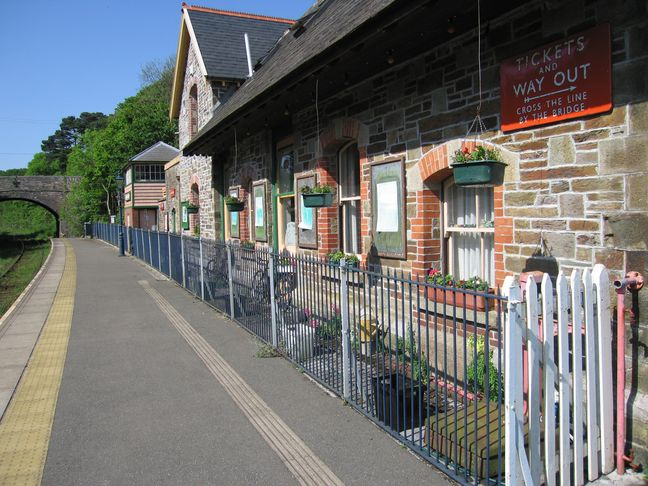
- Former station building and signal box

General information
- Location: Bere Ferrers, Devon; England
- Coordinates: 50.450°N 4.181°W
- Grid reference: SX452635
- Manager: Great Western Railway
- Platforms: 1

Other information
- Station code: BFE
- Classification: DfT category F2

Passengers
- 2021/22: ▲10,786
- 2022/23: ▲11,258
- 2023/24: ▲13,026
- 2024/25: ▲14,614
- 2025/26: ▲15,108
Location
Notes
- Passenger statistics from the Office of Rail and Road

Bere Ferrers station on the Tamar Valley Line is situated near the village of Bere Ferrers in Devon, England. The station is on the former Southern main line between Exeter and Plymouth via Okehampton. It is currently operated by Great Western Railway (GWR).

== History ==
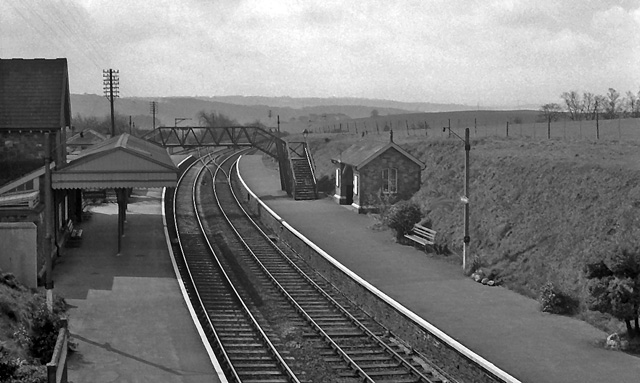
Bere Ferrers in 1964

The Plymouth, Devonport and South Western Junction Railway opened the station on 2 June 1890 with its main line from Lydford to Devonport, which gave the London and South Western Railway a route into Plymouth that was independent of the Great Western Railway.

The station was originally called 'Beer Ferris' after the local Beer family who owned several nearby villages. However, in 1897, the railway company decided that this name promoted an unrefined image of the village due to the association with beer, and therefore changed the name to 'Bere Ferrers' from 18 November 1897. The original spelling can be seen today on the sign on the signal box in the heritage centre.

The station was host to a Southern Railway camping coach from 1936 to 1939. A camping coach was also positioned here by the Southern Region from 1954 to 1959, and two coaches from 1960 to 1964.

Goods traffic was withdrawn from 8 October 1962. Through services beyond Bere Alston towards Tavistock and Exeter were withdrawn on 6 May 1968 and Bere Ferrers was reduced to a single platform on 27 October 1968 which is sufficient for the remaining services to and from Gunnislake.

=== Accidents and incidents ===
The station was the scene of a fatal railway accident on 24 September 1917. Ten soldiers from New Zealand were being transported from Plymouth to Salisbury following their arrival in Britain. At Bere Ferrers station they alighted from their troop train for a brief rest (on the wrong side of the train, between the tracks) and, being unaccustomed to British railways, were struck and killed by an oncoming express. The men are buried in a Plymouth war cemetery, and a plaque was unveiled in 2001 in their memory in the village centre.

== Description ==
The main building was on the down platform and incorporated a house for the station master and remains as a private house. There was also a small goods shed on this side at the Plymouth end of the station which has also been converted into a house. The goods yard is now a railway heritage centre and includes the signal box that was formerly at Pinhoe.

== Services ==
Bere Ferrers is served by GWR trains on the Tamar Valley Line from Gunnislake to Plymouth. Connections with main line services can be made at Plymouth. There are nine services each way calling on weekdays, eight on Saturdays and either five or six on a Sunday (depending on the time of year).

Preceding station	National Rail	Following station
Bere Alston towards Gunnislake	Great Western Railway Tamar Valley Line	St Budeaux Victoria Road towards Plymouth

== Heritage Centre ==
The sidings alongside the station form the Tamar Belle Heritage Centre. This includes some old carriages which are used as a restaurant and as camping coaches. The LSWR signal box was erected here in 1989/90 but was formerly at Pinhoe railway station on the outskirts of Exeter.

== Community railway ==
The railway from Plymouth to Gunnislake is designated as a community railway and is supported by marketing provided by the Devon and Cornwall Rail Partnership. The line is promoted under the "Tamar Valley Line" name.

== See also ==
- Exeter to Plymouth railway of the LSWR
