= Mary Tavy and Blackdown railway station =

Disused railway station in Devon, UK

Mary Tavy and Blackdown

General information
- Location: Mary Tavy, West Devon; United Kingdom
- Platforms: 1

Other information
- Status: Disused

History
- Opened: 1 July 1865
- Closed: 31 December 1962
- Previous names: Mary Tavy
- Original company: Launceston and South Devon Railway
- Pre-grouping: Great Western Railway
- Post-grouping: Southern

Key dates
- 7 December 1906: Station renamed Mary Tavy and Blackdown
- 11 August 1941: Goods traffic ceased
Location

Mary Tavy and Blackdown was a railway station serving the villages of Mary Tavy and Blackdown, operated by the Launceston and South Devon Railway, forming part of the line between Plymouth Millbay and Launceston.

== History ==
This station was situated about 1/2 mile (0.80 km) from both Mary Tavy and Blackdown, and was originally known as just Mary Tavy. It was renamed Mary Tavy and Blackdown in 1906 or 1907.

It was a crossing station while London and South Western Railway trains were running (until 1890). A passing loop was provided, but it was removed in 1892, leaving in use just the platform on the right of trains going towards Launceston.

Preceding station	Disused railways	Following station
Tavistock South	British Rail Western Region; Launceston Branch Line	Lydford

== Sources ==
- Thomas, D.S.J. (1981). The West Country. Regional history of the railways of Great Britain. David & Charles. ISBN 978-0-7153-8210-3.
