= Tavistock College =

Coordinates: 50.54157°N 4.15461°W

Location
- Crowndale Rd; Tavistock, Devon, PL19 8DD; England

Information
- Type: Academy
- Motto: Together: we care, we challenge, we excel
- Established: 1552
- Local authority: Devon County Council
- Trust: Dartmoor Multi-Academy Trust
- Department for Education URN: 145336 Tables
- Ofsted: Reports
- Chair: Victoria Mitchell
- Principal: James Buchanan
- Staff: 300
- Gender: Coeducational
- Age: 11 to 18
- Enrolment: approx. 1800
- Houses: Challenge Together Excel Care
- Colours: Red, White, Black
- Publication: In Focus
- Website: www.tavistockcollege.org

Tavistock College is a coeducational secondary school and sixth form located in Tavistock, Devon, England. As of April 2020, it had about 1200 pupils. The schools draws pupils from a catchment area of about 20 km (12 mi) radius.

== Success ==
In 2013 a Japanese teacher won a Pearson Teaching Award for secondary school teacher of the year.

== Ofsted reviews ==
In early 2010 the school received a "notice to improve" from Ofsted, the national school inspection agency. After a failure to improve, the school was placed into special measures in September 2011 and underwent a change in head teacher fairly soon after. The result of the changes made by school leadership led to an improvement in grades in the next years GCSEs. Following the success in 2012 and 2013, the school came out of special measures and has been progressing well.

== History ==
Tavistock grammar school was founded in 1552. In the 1930s it stood "on the Plymouth road, a modern block with splendid playing fields" but was later moved to the current site to allow for expansion as Tavistock and surrounding areas grew in population.

The college motto was traditionally “Crescit sub pondere virtus” (Virtue flourishes under a burden); this is also the motto of the Earl of Denbigh. However the school motto was changed to ‘Together: we care, we challenge, we excel’.

Previously a community school administered by Devon County Council, in January 2018 Tavistock College converted to academy status. The school is now sponsored by the Dartmoor Multi-Academy Trust.

== Curriculum ==
In 1996 Tavistock College began requiring year 7 and 8 students to take courses about the Japanese language, the first school in England to have such a requirement. As of July 2022, the College no longer offered a GCSE course for Japanese language.

== Other activities ==
Since 2006 the college has organised concerts locally under the name of ParkLife; a ParkLife festival was held in 2007 and 2008.

== Notable former pupils ==
- Graham Dawe, rugby union player
- Rosie Huntington-Whiteley, actress/model, came from a nearby farm; she is known for Transformers: Dark of the Moon
- Seth Lakeman, folk musician
- Sam Sills, sailor
- Danny Chambers, British MP and veterinary surgeon
