= Tavistock South railway station =

Disused railway station in Devon, UK

Coordinates: 50.5471°N 4.1442°W

Tavistock South

General information
- Location: Tavistock, West Devon; United Kingdom
- Platforms: 2

Other information
- Status: Disused

History
- Opened: 22 June 1859
- Closed: 31 December 1962
- Previous names: Tavistock
- Original company: South Devon and Tavistock Railway
- Pre-grouping: Great Western Railway
- Post-grouping: Southern

Key dates
- 26 September 1949: Station renamed Tavistock South
- 7 September 1964: Goods traffic ceased
Location

Tavistock South was a railway station serving the town of Tavistock, operated by the South Devon and Tavistock Railway, forming part of the line between Plymouth Millbay and Launceston.

== History ==
As befitting the terminus of the South Devon and Tavistock Railway line from Plymouth Millbay, the station was provided with a large train shed that spanned the two platforms and three tracks. The station was situated on the hillside close to the town centre. The original buildings were of timber, but they were badly damaged by a fire in 1887 and were replaced by a stone structure.

The main buildings were on the side used by trains going towards Plymouth. A footbridge was eventually provided at the north end of the station beyond the train shed. A small engine shed was provided at the other end of the station, but this was no longer needed once the Launceston and South Devon Railway line to Launceston opened on 1 July 1865.

On 26 September 1949 the station was renamed Tavistock South to distinguish it from the Southern Region station on the Plymouth to London Waterloo route, which was then named "Tavistock North". Passenger services were withdrawn on 31 December 1962 but goods traffic continued until 7 September 1964. Passengers could still travel by train from Tavistock North until it closed in 1968.

Preceding station	Disused railways	Following station
Whitchurch Down	British Rail Western Region; Launceston Branch Line	Mary Tavy and Blackdown

== See also ==
- Tavistock North railway station (On London and South Western Railway route)
- Tavistock railway station (proposed)
