= Tavistock railway station =

Proposed new station in Devon, England

Coordinates: 50.5363°N 4.158°W

Tavistock railway station is a proposed new station to serve Tavistock in Devon, England, in order to reinstate a rail connection between the town and Plymouth, about 13 miles (21 km) to the south.

== Background ==
Tavistock used to have two railway stations, both now closed, with trains to Plymouth:

- Tavistock North was the Plymouth, Devonport and South Western Junction Railway station, operated by the London and South Western Railway.
- Tavistock South was the Great Western Railway station, on the other side of the river Tavy, opposite the town.

The trackbed of the Tavistock North route for around a mile south of Tavistock North station is open to the public as a footpath and nature reserve. The route is almost intact to Bere Alston where it joins today's Tamar Valley Line between Gunnislake and Plymouth. An engineering assessment in 2009 showed that the rail-bed, bridges and tunnels between Bere Alston and Tavistock were in sound condition.

The Tamar Valley line, with which the line from Tavistock would connect, was designated as a community rail line in September 2005, being one of seven pilots for the Department for Transport's Community Rail Development Strategy. One of the aims of this designation was to establish the potential for extending the line from Bere Alston to Tavistock.

== Reopening plans ==
In 2008 Kilbride, a housing developer, offered to pay for rebuilding the railway to Bere Alston (from a new station just to the south of Tavistock, on the route from the former Tavistock North station) if agreement to build 800 properties near the station could be concluded. Kilbride published a detailed update on this project in December 2010.

A report by Devon County Council in September 2010 said: "In suffering deteriorating travel conditions while having to support new development, Tavistock is not unique. Where it differs from other towns is that there is a timely, sustainable and affordable solution that will benefit Tavistock’s residents and visitors among others. This solution is the proposed reinstatement of the rail service between Tavistock and Plymouth via Bere Alston."

The West Devon Core Strategy, which was adopted on 19 April 2011, identified the need for additional residential and employment development in Tavistock and the potential need to reopen the railway to Bere Alston. Devon County Council has said that it is working with West Devon Borough Council, the developer and Kilbride Community Rail to develop the project further but reinstatement would occur only in the long term. The County Council would be undertaking the necessary work to secure the powers to build the railway over the coming few years.

West Devon Borough Council announced in August 2011 that Kilbride Group had sold its interest in the residential land at the site to national house builder Bovis Homes Ltd, and that Kilbride would work with Devon County Council to be the promoter of the rail reinstatement scheme, which will largely be funded by the residential development. Councillor Stuart Hughes, Devon County Council Cabinet Member for Highways and Transportation, said: “Improving links to major urban areas is a key transport vision for Devon’s market towns, and making better use of sustainable transport, including rail, is an important element of this vision. This proposed rail link will play a vital role in improving connections between Tavistock and Plymouth to offer a real alternative to using the car, while also providing Tavistock with a link to the national rail network”.

Network Rail's Network Specification for the Western route, published in September 2011, noted that "West Devon Council are proposing to reinstate the former railway line between Bere Alston and Tavistock subject to funding and availability of rolling stock".

A Devon County Council leaflet, endorsed by West Devon Borough Council, Bovis Homes and Kilbride Community Rail, was published in February 2012 outlining the project and emphasising that a public inquiry would be necessary before work could begin, with the inquiry not likely to be held until 2014. The county council launched a consultation in January 2013 on reopening the railway between Tavistock and Bere Alston, and providing a parallel cycle track. It submitted a report to the Planning Inspectorate in October 2014 to the inspectorate to trigger a decision on whether a full environmental impact assessment (EIA) of the proposals is required (the ‘screening’ stage), and the second step is to set out the scope of the assessments needed for the EIA (the ‘scoping’ stage). Devon County Council were awarded £50,000 from the October 2021 United Kingdom budget toward the cost of producing the required Strategic Outline Business Case for the creation of the new station and reconstruction of the line to serve it.

In February 2017 it was suggested that new cheap 'no-frill mini trains' could be running on disused or little used lines across the country such as Bere Alston to Tavistock in order to see services closed by Beeching reopened. Plymouth City Council announced in April 2017 that a line to Tavistock could be open within five years and be connected to a tram-style 'Plymouth metro' by 2024.

An announcement on the outcome of the bid to re-open the line to Bere Alston was made in early Autumn 2023, when Huw Merriman, the Minister of State for Rail, said that "the project will be funded to delivery, subject to future updates to the project business case". However, following the 2024 United Kingdom general election, the plan to reconnect the rail line between Tavistock and Bere Alston was cancelled as part of the cancellation of the Restoring Your Railway programme. Nevertheless, Transport Secretary Louise Haigh said that a review of transport infrastructure schemes currently under way would identify any where the benefits justify replacement funding being made available. Campaigners for the re-opening of the line expressed their intention to continue seeking funding for the project.

== See also ==
- Exeter to Plymouth railway of the LSWR
- Plymouth, Devonport and South Western Junction Railway
