= Tavistock North railway station =

Disused railway station in Devon, England

Coordinates: 50.5518°N 4.1453°W

Tavistock North
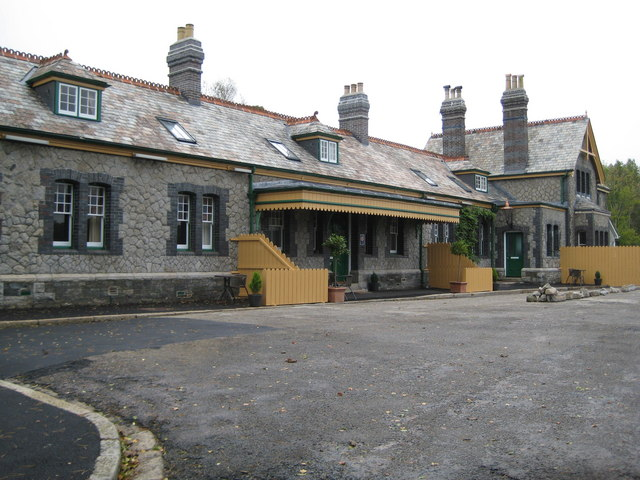
- The front of the station in 2008

General information
- Location: Tavistock, West Devon; United Kingdom
- Platforms: 2

Other information
- Status: Disused

History
- Opened: 2 June 1890
- Closed: 6 May 1968
- Original company: Plymouth, Devonport and South Western Junction Railway
- Post-grouping: Southern Railway
Location

Tavistock North was a railway station serving the town of Tavistock, operated by the Plymouth, Devonport and South Western Junction Railway, but forming part of the Exeter to Plymouth section of the London and South Western Railway.

== History ==
The station opened on 2 June 1890. The main station building is Grade II listed and said to have been designed by Galbraith and Church who were the engineers for the line. The contractors were Pethick and Sons of Plymouth. The granite came from Pethwick's Swell Tor quarry, the bricks from the Plymouth Brickworks at Gunnislake and the ironwork from Messrs Mathews and Co at Tavistock Ironworks.

The station was closed in May 1968. As it continued to be lived in by the former station-master and then his widow until 1999, the buildings have remained remarkably unaltered since its closure.

The station building has been restored and converted into three self-catering cottages. The stationmaster's house is being restored as a private dwelling, while the goods yard, now known as Kilworthy Park, houses the offices of West Devon Borough Council. The track bed for about one mile (1.6 km) south of Tavistock North station is open to the public as a footpath and nature reserve, and it is possible to walk across the viaducts that overlook the town.

Preceding station	Disused railways	Following station
Bere Alston	British Rail Western Region Exeter to Plymouth Line	Brentor

== Future options ==
The rest of the track bed south of Tavistock is almost intact to Bere Alston, where it joins the present-day Tamar Valley Line. There has been discussion regarding the re-opening of a rail link for a number of years. Engineering assessment has shown that the track bed, and structures such as bridges and tunnels, are in sound condition. In its 2023 autumn statement, the government confirmed £150 million for the project, subject to an updated business plan being approved.

== See also ==
- Tavistock South railway station (On Great Western Railway route)
- Tavistock railway station (proposed)
