= Tavistock =

Town in Devon, England

Coordinates: 50.545°N 4.150°W

- Stannary Town
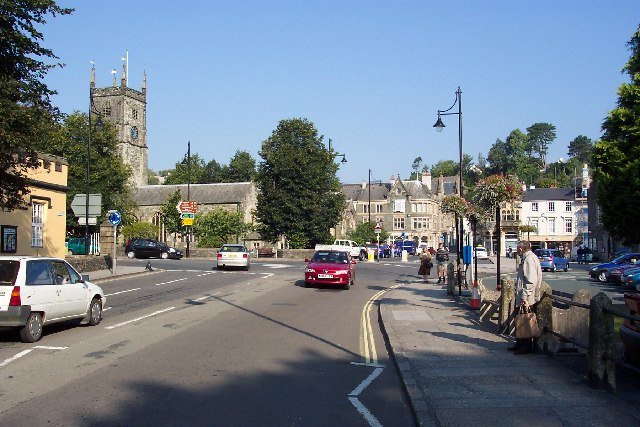
- Tavistock town centre

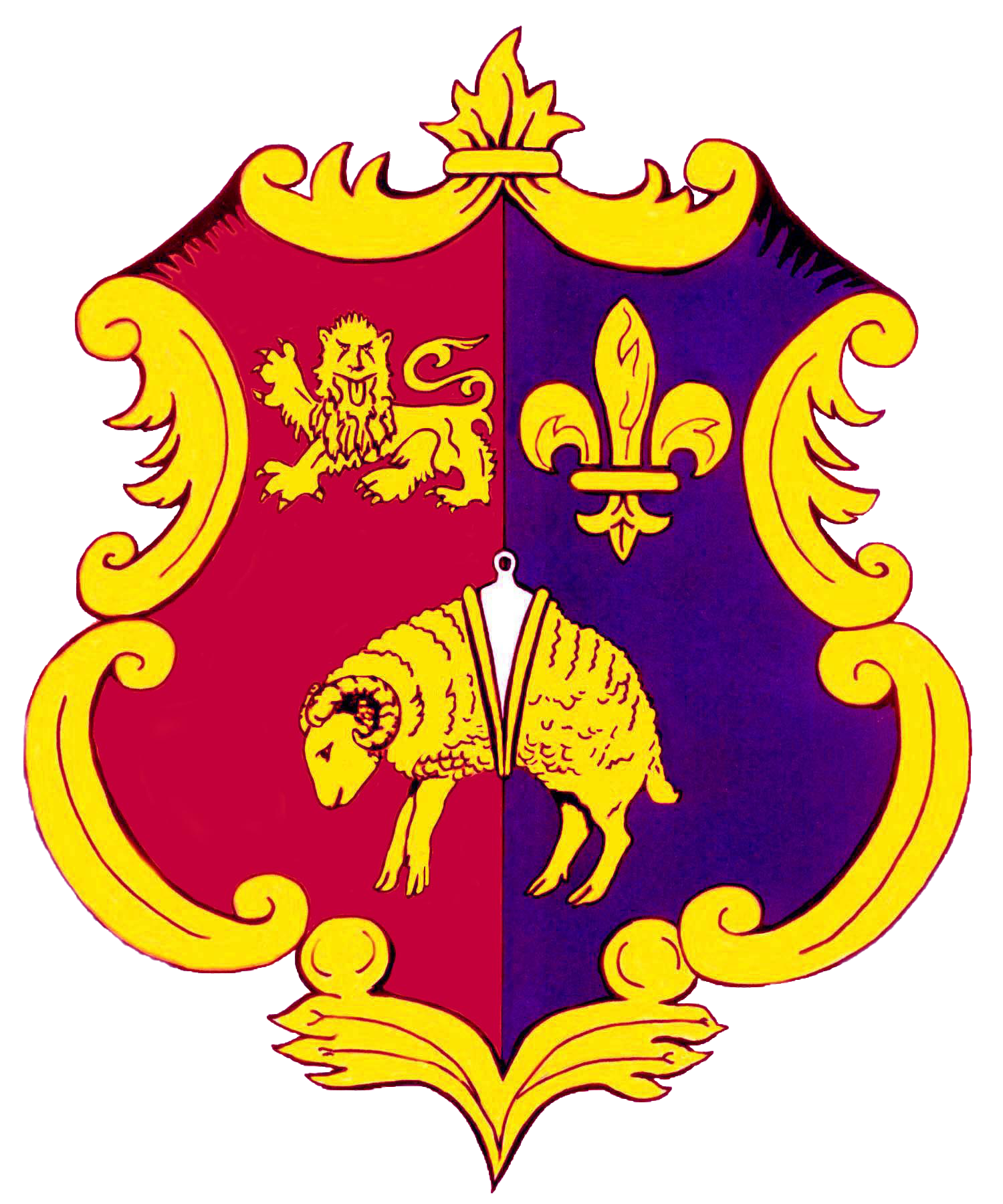
- Coat of arms

- Location within Devon
- Population: 12,675 (2021 Census)
- OS grid reference: SX480740
- Civil parish: Tavistock
- District: West Devon
- Shire county: Devon
- Region: South West
- Country: England
- Sovereign state: United Kingdom
- Post town: TAVISTOCK
- Postcode district: PL19
- Dialling code: 01822
- Police: Devon and Cornwall
- Fire: Devon and Somerset
- Ambulance: South Western
- UK Parliament: Torridge and Tavistock

Tavistock (/ˈtævɪstɒk/ TAV-iss-tok) is a market town and civil parish in the West Devon district of Devon, England. It is an ancient stannary situated on the River Tavy, from which its name derives. The town is approximately 12 miles (19 km) north of Plymouth, 29 miles (47 km) southwest of Exeter, and 44 miles (71 km) east northeast of Truro. It had a population of 12,675 at the 2021 census.

The town traces its recorded history back to at least 961 when Tavistock Abbey, whose ruins lie in the centre of the town, was founded. Its most famous son is Sir Francis Drake.

== History ==
=== Middle Ages ===
The area around Tavistock (formerly Tavistoke), where the River Tavy runs wide and shallow allowing it to be easily crossed, and near the secure high ground of Dartmoor, was inhabited long before historical records. The surrounding area is full of archaeological remains from the Bronze and Iron Ages.

The abbey of Saint Mary and Saint Rumon was founded in 961 by Ordgar, Earl of Devon. After destruction by Danish raiders in 997 it was restored, and at the time of the Conquest ranked as the wealthiest house in Devon, including the hundred and manor of Tavistock among its possessions. Among its famous abbots was Aldred, who crowned Harold II and William I, and died Archbishop of York.

In 1105 a royal charter was granted by Henry I to the monks of Tavistock to run a weekly "Pannier Market" (so called after the baskets used to carry goods) on a Friday, which still takes place today. In 1116 a three-day fair was also granted to mark the feast of Saint Rumon, another tradition that is still maintained in the shape of the annual "Goosey" fair on the second Wednesday in October.

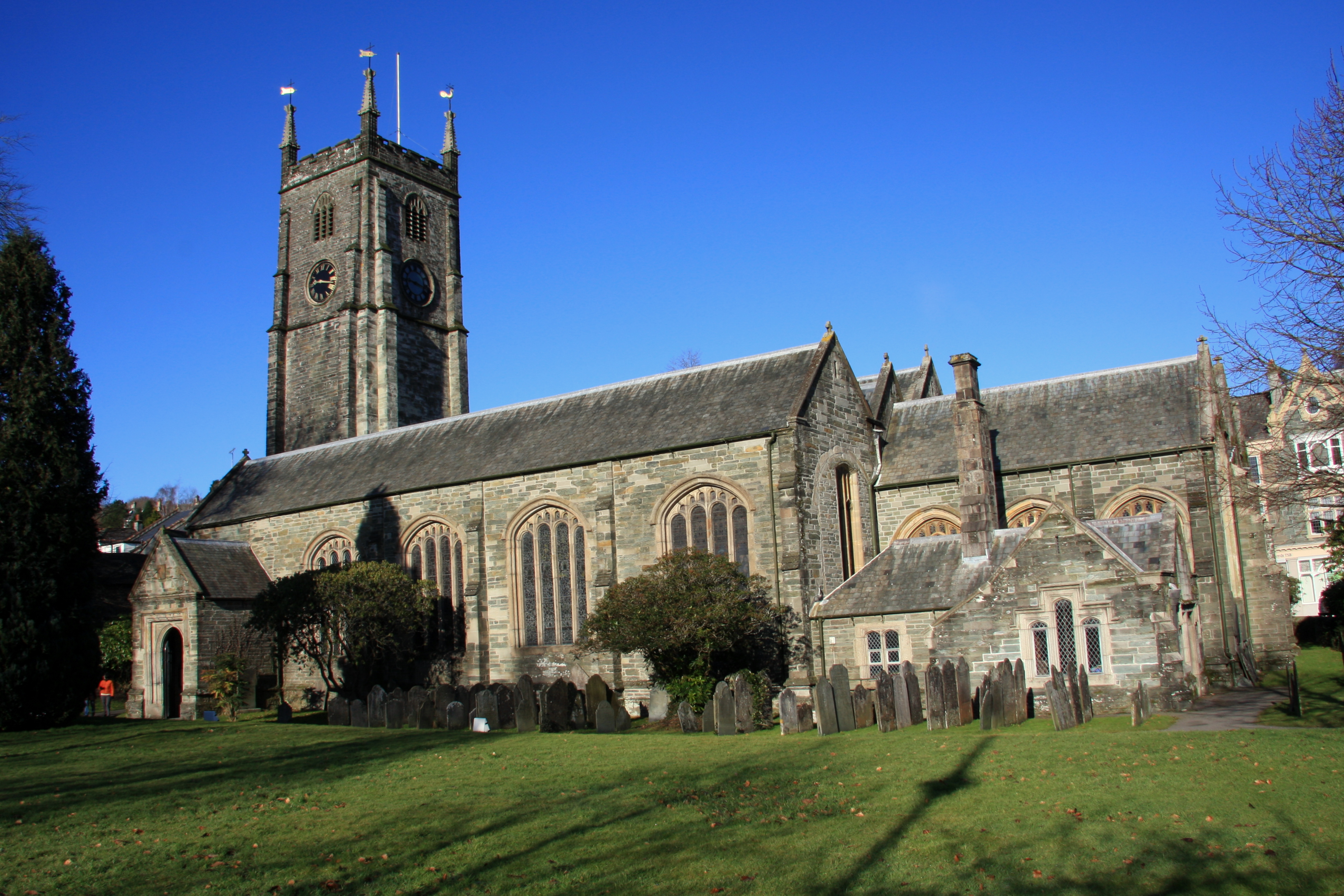
St Eustachius' Church, Tavistock

By 1185 Tavistock had achieved borough status, and in 1295 it became a parliamentary borough, sending two members to parliament. The abbey church was rebuilt in 1285. In 1305, with the growing importance of the area as one of Europe's richest sources of tin, Tavistock was one of the four stannary towns appointed by charter of Edward I, where tin was stamped and weighed and monthly courts were held for the regulation of mining affairs.

==== Parish church ====
The St Eustachius' Church (named after the Roman centurion who became a Christian) was dedicated by Bishop Stapledon in 1318 though there are very few remains of that building today. It was rebuilt and enlarged into its current form between 1350 and 1450, at which time the Clothworkers' Aisle (an outer south aisle) was included, an indication of the growing importance of the textile industry to the local economy—the trade was protected by a 1467 statute. The whole is in the Perpendicular style and consists of a nave and chancel; both with two aisles, tower and outer south aisle.

It possesses a lofty tower supported on four open arches, one of which was reputedly added to accommodate the 19th-century "tinners" or tin miners. Within are monuments to the Glanville and Bourchier families, besides some fine stained glass, one window being the work of William Morris and another of Charles Eamer Kempe. It also has a roof boss featuring one of the so-called 'Tinners' Hares', a trio of rabbits/hares joined at and sharing three ears between them. The font is octagonal and dates from the 15th century.

=== Early modern period ===
The greater part of the abbey was rebuilt in 1457–1458. The town continued to prosper in the charge of the abbots, acquiring one of England's first printing presses in 1525. Tavistock remained an important centre of both trade and religion until the dissolution of the monasteries—the abbey was demolished in 1539, leaving the ruins still to be seen around the centre of the town. From that time on, the dominant force in the town became the Russell family, Earls and later Dukes of Bedford, who took over much of the land following the Dissolution. In 1552 two fairs on 23 April and 28 November were granted by Edward VI to the Earl of Bedford, then lord of the manor.

In the 17th century great quantities of cloth were sold at the Friday market, and four fairs were held at the feasts of Saint Michael, Epiphany, Saint Mark, and the Decollation of John the Baptist. The charter of Charles II instituted a Tuesday market, and fairs on the Thursday after Whitsunday and at the feast of Saint Swithin.

Tavistock is tied from late medieval times with the Russells, the family name of the Earls of Bedford and since 1694, the Dukes of Bedford. This is clearly seen from the history of the town. The second title of the Duke of Bedford is the Marquess of Tavistock, taken as the courtesy title of the eldest son and heir to the dukedom, it illustrates the importance of this Devon town, its hinterland and the minerals beneath it to the family's fortunes. It is believed that the Russell family retains considerable interests in the locality. Most recently, Robin, the short-lived 14th Duke, as Marquess of Tavistock, was a frequent visitor to the town along with his wife, Henrietta. Andrew Russell is the 15th Duke of Bedford and Marquess of Tavistock.

It is this Russell family connection through the Bedford Estates which gives the name by ownership to Russell Square and Tavistock Square in London, famously home to the Tavistock Clinic, and the bus-bombing of 7 July 2005.

==== Francis Drake ====
Around 1540 (some sources state 1542 as the exact year), Sir Francis Drake was born at Crowndale Farm, just to the west of what is now Tavistock College. A Blue Plaque is mounted on the current farmhouse, behind which Drake is believed to have been born, the original farmhouse having been dismantled and the stone transported for use in Lew Trenchard. He became a prominent figure of his age, a champion of Queen Elizabeth, the first Englishman to circumnavigate the world from 1577 to 1580 and one of the English commanders in the victory against the Spanish Armada in 1588.

The famous statue of Drake on Plymouth Hoe is a copy of that on a roundabout on the A386 at the western end of the town, with panels not replicated on the Hoe copy. Drake later made his home at Buckland Abbey, about eight miles (13 km) away towards Plymouth, jointly owned/run by Plymouth City Council and the National Trust, and now a museum to Drake.

==== Industry ====
Mines of copper, manganese, lead, silver and tin were previously in the neighbourhood and the town played host to a considerable trade of cattle and corn, and industries in brewing and iron-founding.

By the 17th century, tin mining was on the wane and the town relied more heavily on the cloth trade. Under the stewardship of the Russells the town remained prosperous, surviving the Black Death in 1625 (though 52 townspeople died).

==== English Civil War ====
In the English Civil War starting 1642, the town was at first held by the Parliamentarians (Francis Russell, the 4th Earl of Bedford was a leading figure in the parliamentarian movement), before later hosting King Charles I and his Royalist troops in 1643 after the defeat of the Parliamentary forces at the Battle of Bradock Down. The town was recaptured by the Parliamentarian New Model Army following the end of the Siege of Plymouth in 1646.

In 1694, William Russell, 5th Earl of Bedford became the first Duke of Bedford.

=== Late modern period ===
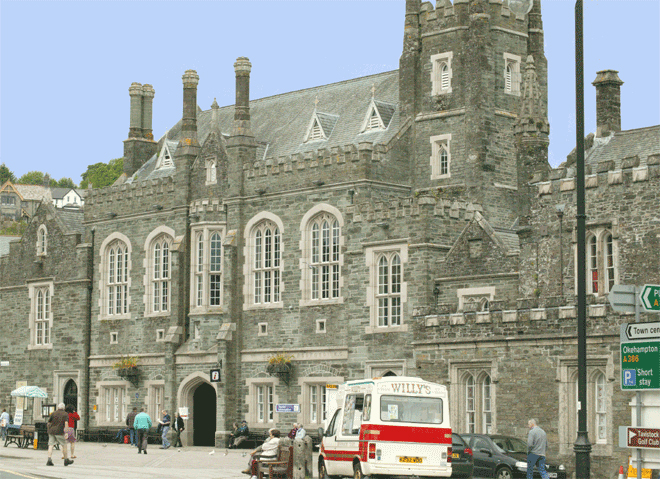
Bedford Square and Tavistock Town Hall

By 1800, cloth was heading the same way as tin had done a century earlier, but copper was starting to be copiously mined in the area, to such an extent that by 1817 the Tavistock Canal had been dug (most of the labour being performed by French prisoners of war from the Napoleonic Wars) to carry copper to Morwellham Quay on the River Tamar, where it could be loaded into sailing ships. In 1822 the old fairs were abolished in favour of six fairs on the second Wednesday in May, July, September, October, November and December. The population in the 1841 census was 4,622 inhabitants.

In the mid-19th century, with nearby Devon Great Consols mine at Blanchdown — one of the biggest copper mining operations in the world — Tavistock was booming again, earning the 7th Duke of Bedford alone over £2,000,000. A statue in copper of the 7th Duke stands in Guildhall Square. The Duke built a 50,000 imperial gallon (230 m^{3}) reservoir to supply the town in 1845, as well as a hundred miners' houses at the southern end of town, between 1845 and 1855. There is a strong, recognisable vernacular "Bedford style" of design, exemplified in Tavistock Town Hall and "Bedford Cottages" ubiquitous across Tavistock and much of the local area to the north and west, where the Bedfords had their estate and summer "cottage" at Endsleigh House and Gardens, which since 2005 is the Hotel Endsleigh run by Alex Polizzi.

Tavistock was deprived of one member of Parliament in 1867 and finally disenfranchised in 1885. The railway came to the town in 1859, with connections to the Great Western Railway and the London and South Western Railway (LSWR). At around this time the centre of town was substantially and ruthlessly remodelled by the 7th Duke of Bedford, including the construction of the current town hall and Pannier Market buildings, and the widening of the Abbey Bridge, first built in 1764, and a new Drake Road ramped up northwards from Bedford Square to the LSWR station. Tavistock North railway station opened to much acclaim and fanfare in 1890. The population had peaked at around 9,000. By 1901 the population had halved, recorded as 4,728. In 1968, following the Beeching Report, Tavistock Station closed, and in 1999 English Heritage listed the building as Grade II.

Kelly College, a co-educational public school, to the north-east of the town was founded by Admiral Benedictus Marwood Kelly. It opened in 1877 for the education of his descendants and the orphan sons of naval officers, and is a pastiche of the Bedford and High Victorian styles of building. It later amalgamated with Mount House to form Mount Kelly Foundation.

==== Early 20th and 21st centuries ====
In 1911, the Bedford influence on the town came to an end after over 450 years, when the family sold most of their holdings in the area to meet death duties.

West Devon Borough Council is based in Tavistock, about 500 metres north of Bedford Square at Kilworthy Park. There was a small police station under part of the Bedford building complex on Bedford Square; this has closed and a new one is in Abbey Rise. The adjacent historic Magistrates Court has also closed and the nearest criminal court is now at Plymouth Law Courts.

In 1926 a meeting was held in Tavistock with representatives of the UK government and UK scientific instrument makers. A comparison was made on Dartmoor between UK theodolites and their European competition, especially the Swiss Wild T2 theodolite. One result of this conference was the 1930 "Tavistock" theodolite by Cooke, Troughton & Simms.

In 1933 the long-disused canal was put to use providing hydroelectric power for the area.

A war memorial in Bedford Square commemorates the townsfolk killed in the First and Second World Wars. Many families across Britain exercised their right not to have their family members named on these public memorials. In 2006 it was planned to move the monument to a site in the graveyard of the Parish Church, but due to local opposition this did not happen.

==== World War 2 ====
In May 1943, parts of the American 29th Infantry division were stationed in Tavistock, as well as other areas of the South West. From 1944 there were a number of high ranking visits to the division, including that of Dwight D. Eisenhower, in February of that year, and Army Lieutenant General Omar Bradley.

The stationed division then left the town in May 1944 to be involved in the Omaha Beach landings part of Operation Overlord.

==== Later 20th and 21st centuries ====
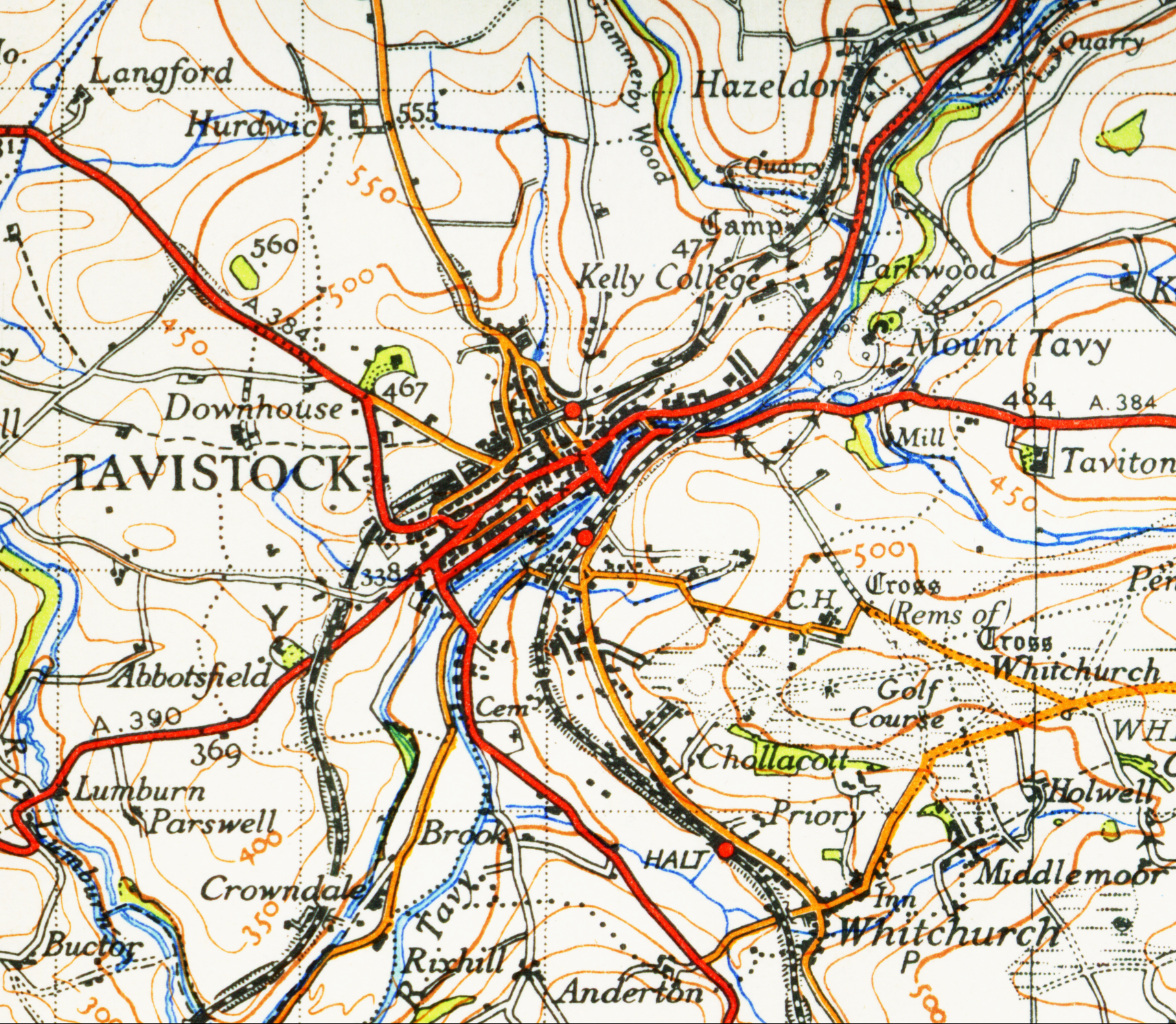
A map of Tavistock from 1946, showing the layout of the town and location of the two railway stations.

Tavistock had two railway stations, which are both now closed. Tavistock South was the Great Western Railway's station, on the route between Launceston and Plymouth. This was closed and mostly dismantled between 1962 and 1965. The station was sited to the south of Bedford Square, just over the bridge and to the right—now a council depot: no trace of the station remains. Tavistock North was the Plymouth, Devonport and South Western Junction Railway's station, operated by the London and South Western Railway, on the route between Lydford and Plymouth via Bere Alston. This opened on 2 June 1890 and closed on 6 May 1968. The main station building survives as railway-themed bed and breakfast accommodation while the extensive goods yard is now known as Kilworthy Park and houses the offices of West Devon Borough Council. The railway for around a mile south of Tavistock North station is open to the public as a footpath and nature reserve and one can walk across the viaducts that overlook the town.

The trackbed of the Tavistock North route is almost intact to Bere Alston, where it joins today's Tamar Valley Line. The possible re-opening of a rail link has been discussed for a number of years. Engineering assessment shows the rail-bed, bridges and tunnels to be in sound condition. In 2008 a housing developer offered to rebuild the railway to Bere Alston (from a new station slightly south of the town) if they were allowed to build 800 properties. This has also encouraged speculation about restoring the Tavistock-Okehampton rail link, which could provide an alternative to the Devon coastal main line to link the South West Region with the rest of the country. In December 2010 the developer published an update on the possibility of reinstating the line between Tavistock and Bere Alston and hence providing a train service between Tavistock and Plymouth. In April 2010 the Liberal Democrats had suggested that a Tavistock-Plymouth service could be included in the rail expansion plans should they win the 2010 General Election.

In 1986, the town's two newspapers, the Tavistock Gazette (founded in 1857) and the Tavistock Times (established in 1920) merged to form the current weekly publication, the Tavistock Times Gazette, with a circulation of around 8,000. The newspaper is owned by Tindle Newspaper Group. The newspaper celebrated its 150th anniversary in 2007, with a visit from the Prince of Wales and Duchess of Cornwall.

In July 2006 Tavistock was named the eastern Gateway to the Cornish Mining World Heritage Site, which runs westward through the Tamar Valley and Great Consols Mine, down the spine of Cornwall to Lands End. This £75 million project is likely to bring more tourists to Tavistock. There has been no progress with proposals for a £1.1 million World Heritage Site Interpretation Centre, planned for 2007, to be built in the area of the Guildhall, and overlooking the River Tavy.

A local community group known as "Tavistock Forward" have been negotiating to take over the Guildhall complex with police and English Heritage endorsement, with leaseback of the existing police station to Devon & Cornwall Police, while developing the Guildhall itself.

== Geography ==
Tavistock lies on the edge of Dartmoor, around 24 kilometres (14.9 mi) north of Plymouth on the A386, with a population of 11,018. The town is centred on the paved amenity of Bedford Square, around which are found St. Eustachius' Church and the abbey ruins, to the west, the Grade II listed town hall, the disused former Guildhall/magistrates' court buildings, and Pannier Market buildings behind the town hall. Abbey Bridge crosses the River Tavy to the south, while West Street and Duke Street, on either side of the north end of the square, form the main shopping areas, with the indoor [Pannier] market running behind Duke Street.

Plymouth Road, the A386 heading west from the centre of the square, is home to much of the town's tourist trade, with many hotels and bed and breakfast establishments, as well as the town's bus station. Between Plymouth Road and the Tavy is the park, known locally as the Meadows, along with car parks, the Wharf theatre, cinema and culture centre, and a public recreation pool. West of the Meadows are found the substantial playing fields and buildings of Tavistock College, reached by an underpass below the A386. Further south along the Plymouth Road/A386 lie industrial estates, supermarkets and other large retail outlets. To the north and east of town lies Whitchurch Down, where Dartmoor begins immediately.

=== Climate ===
Tavistock has an oceanic climate (Köppen climate classification Cfb).

Climate data for Tavistock
Month	Jan	Feb	Mar	Apr	May	Jun	Jul	Aug	Sep	Oct	Nov	Dec	Year
Mean daily maximum °C (°F)	8 (46)	8 (46)	9 (48)	12 (54)	14 (57)	17 (63)	19 (66)	19 (66)	17 (63)	14 (57)	11 (52)	9 (48)	13 (55)
Mean daily minimum °C (°F)	3 (37)	3 (37)	4 (39)	5 (41)	8 (46)	11 (52)	13 (55)	13 (55)	11 (52)	9 (48)	6 (43)	4 (39)	8 (46)
Source: Weather Channel

== Religious sites ==
- See also Tavistock Abbey
- For the parish church of St Eustachius, see above, Parish church
- The Roman Catholic Church of Our Lady of the Assumption and St Mary Magdalene, Fitzford, was built at the expense of the Duke of Bedford in 1867. It is an ambitious building in the neo-transitional style and the tall spire is conspicuous from the high ground surrounding the town. This church was intended as a place of worship for miners. It fell into disuse and was bought in 1952 for use as a Roman Catholic church.

== Education ==
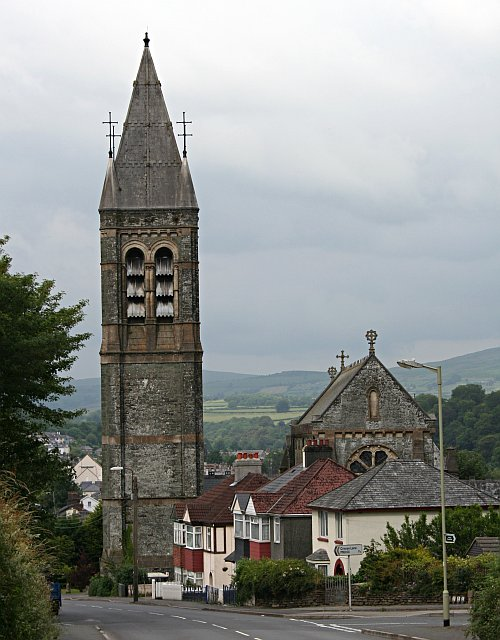
Church of St Mary Magdalene

=== State ===
Most secondary education is provided by Tavistock College- a state-funded specialist Language College with approximately 2,000 pupils, drawn from a catchment area of about 20 km (12 mi) radius. The college has links with Japan, Uganda, Spain and India where staff exchanges and student visits and projects take place.

Some children who pass the optional Eleven-Plus exam at a high level travel to one of the three remaining grammar schools in Plymouth. Others who leave school at 16 attend the City College C of F E there. Tavistock has a choice of primary schools: Church of England St Peter's and also St Rumon's, together with Devon County Council's Tavistock Community Primary and Whitchurch Primary.

=== Independent ===
Mount Kelly School is the independent school in Tavistock. It has two main sites, the college which is situated on Parkwood Road and the Preparatory School which is situated on Mount Tavy Road. The school has 570 pupils between the ages of 3 and 18. Mount Kelly was formed in 2014 after two independent schools, Kelly College and Mount House School merged.

== Life and events ==
=== Market village and shopping centre ===
Tavistock remains a small market town, providing shopping and entertainment for its residents, many small outlying villages and the local farming community. The town is now a centre for the West Devon and Dartmoor tourist trade. It is a fast-growing dormitory area for commuters working in Plymouth and has a sizeable retired population, giving Tavistock an average resident age of 43.

Markets were originally held in Bank Square. A specialist Corn Market was erected on the corner of West Street and King Street in 1835. The main market continues to operate in the large covered market building, the Pannier Market, completed in 1860; the main market is on Fridays, on other days the market hosts specialised events, such as craft fairs and antiques fairs. A Farmers' Market takes place in the Square fortnightly and has been voted Best Farmer's Market in the South West.

In 2005 Tavistock was voted 'Best Market Town' in England and in 2006 'Best Food Town', largely on the strength of the many independent food shops and suppliers in the town and nearby. The town also became Devon's second Fairtrade Town (in 2006).

=== Events ===
The biggest event in the town's calendar is the annual Tavistock Goose Fair (known locally as the "Goosey Fair") which has existed since 1116. It occurs on the second Wednesday of October, and takes over much of the town for several days, drawing crowds which far outnumber the resident population. Traditionally, the Fair was an opportunity to buy a Christmas goose, with plenty of time to fatten the bird before Christmas; nowadays, along with a multitude of street vendors selling a vast range of wares, there many rides and games associated with funfairs, such as fortune tellers.

There is an annual two-day garden festival held on the Spring Bank Holiday weekend and a carnival with a two-day Balloon Fiesta each August bank holiday weekend. In May there is an annual Tavistock Music & Arts Festival.

In 2010, the town was chosen to be a stage depart town in the Tour of Britain cycle race.

On the first Sunday in October, the annual Abbots Way Walk finishes in Tavistock. Started in 1962, this challenge walk starts at Buckfast Abbey and participants walk 24 miles (39 km) across Southern Dartmoor to finish at Tavistock.

== Transport ==
=== Buses ===
The main bus operator in Tavistock is Stagecoach South West, which runs the following key routes:

- 1 to Plymouth
- 87 to Bere Alston
- 89 Town Service.
- 118 to Okehampton

Oakleys Coaches & Country Bus run rural services onto Dartmoor. Go Cornwall Bus operates route 79 to Callington.

Lomax Tours run coach excursions to places further afield.

=== Railway ===
The nearest National Rail stations are at:

- Gunnislake for stations into Plymouth
- Okehampton for local services to Exeter St Davids, operated by Great Western Railway
- Plymouth for local and inter-city services to Bristol Temple Meads, Cardiff Central, Birmingham New Street, Penzance, Taunton, Reading and London Paddington; services are operated by Great Western Railway and CrossCountry.

The town was once served by two railway stations: Tavistock North and Tavistock South; both closed in the 1960s.

There are plans to open a new station in the town; if successful, this would reinstate a rail connection between Tavistock railway station and Plymouth, about 13 miles (21 km) to the south.

=== Roads ===
The A386 connects Tavistock to the A30 in the north and to the A38 in the south.

== Culture and sport ==
Tavistock's coat of arms is blazoned "Per pale, gules and azure, a fleece banded; a chief, dexter a lion passant gardant, sinister a fleur-de-lys, all or". The earliest record of these arms is in 1684. The fleece refers to the wool trade and the fleur-de-lys probably to Our Lady, joint patron of Tavistock Abbey. The town's motto is "Crescit sub pondere virtus", meaning "virtue flourishes under a burden".

=== Tavistock Penny Token ===
Bigbury Mint Ltd, medal makers based near Plymouth in Devon, produce a semi-reproduction of the Tavistock Penny Token which is distinguished from the original by the Bigbury Mint mark stamped on both sides of the coin. There is an example of the original coin held in the Science Museum Collection. The Bigbury Mint reproduction coin is struck in copper as a celebration of the proud mining history of the town, the obverse of the coin features the Tavistock fleur-de-lys and the reverse of the coin has a carving of the mine, along with the words "Devon Mines, 1811".

=== Literature ===
Tavistock was the birthplace of the poet William Browne. The town is mentioned in some of Sir Arthur Conan Doyle's Sherlock Holmes adventures, including The Hound of the Baskervilles and "The Adventure of Silver Blaze". It is also receives a mention in R. D. Blackmore's classic Lorna Doone and Neal Stephenson's novel, The System of the World. Anna Eliza Bray was the author of The Borders of the Tamar and the Tavy (1836), an account of the traditions and superstitions of the neighbourhood of Tavistock in the form of letters to Robert Southey.

=== Sport ===
Tavistock has one senior football team, Tavistock A.F.C. and two junior football teams: Tavistock Town and Tavistock Thistles. Together the three clubs form Tavistock Community Football Club offering coaching and competition to players of all ages from 5 years old to veterans. There is also a rugby team with a large and active minis and junior section, Tavistock Rugby Football Club.

=== Media ===
Local TV coverage is provided by BBC South West and ITV West Country. Television signals are received from the Caradon Hill and the local relay TV transmitters.

Tavistock's local radio stations are BBC Radio Devon on 103.4 FM, Radio Exe Devon on DAB, Heart West on 96.6 FM, and Greatest Hits Radio South West (formerly The Breeze) on 105.5 FM.

The Tavistock Times Gazette, published on Thursdays, is the town's local newspaper.

== Twin towns ==
The town has had twinning links with Pontivy in France since 1958 and Celle in Germany.

== Notable people ==
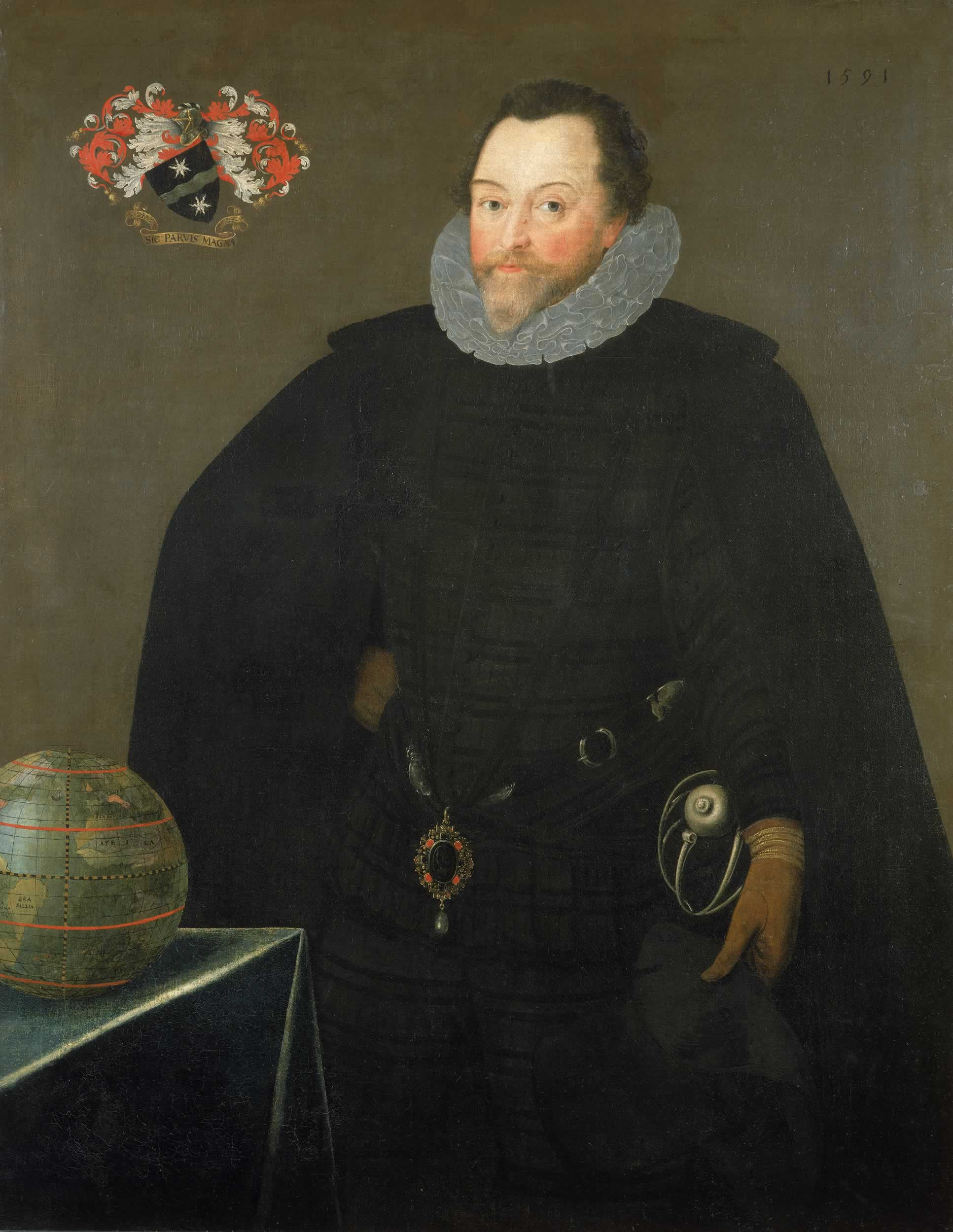
Francis Drake, 1591

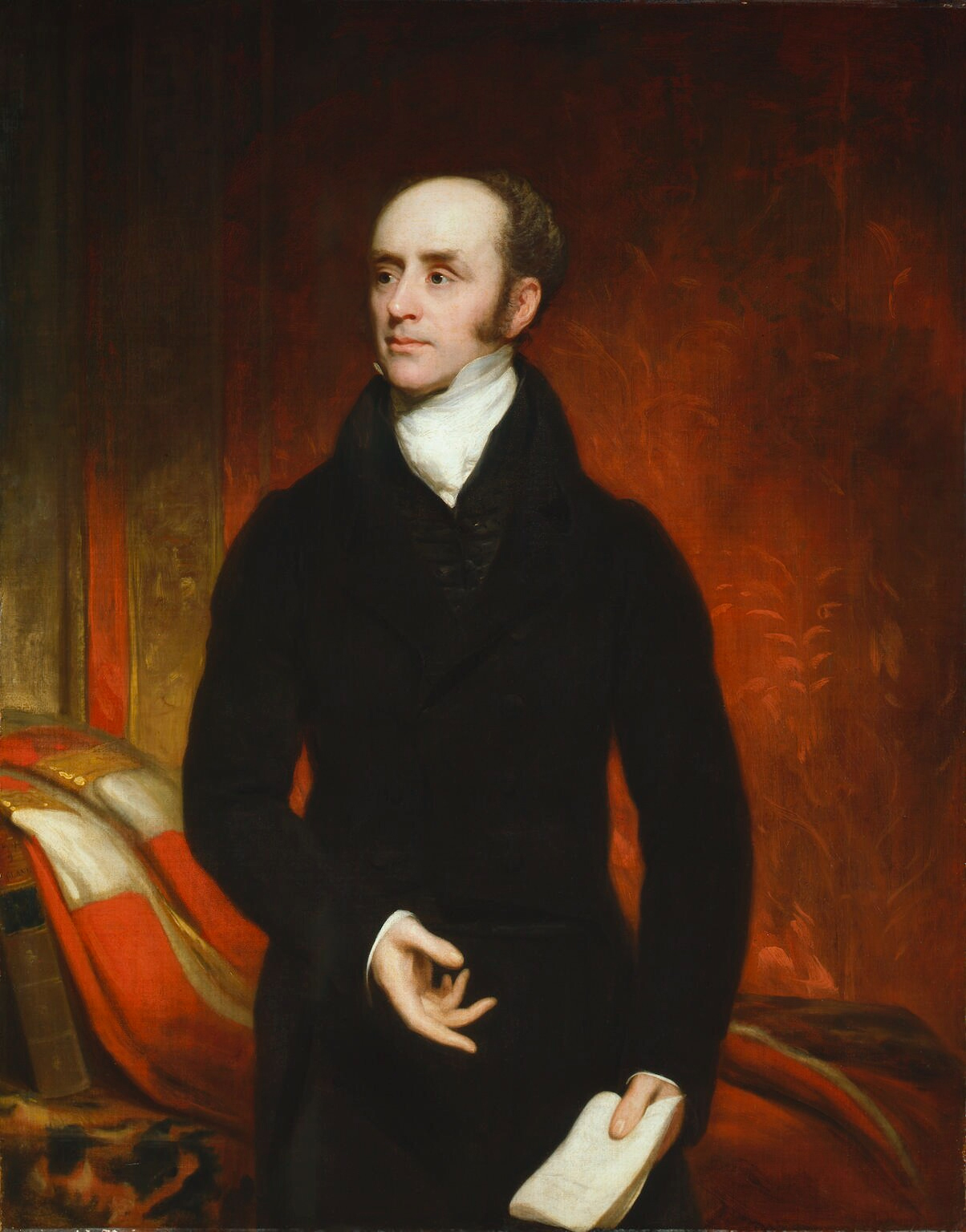
Charles Grey, 2nd Earl Grey, 1821

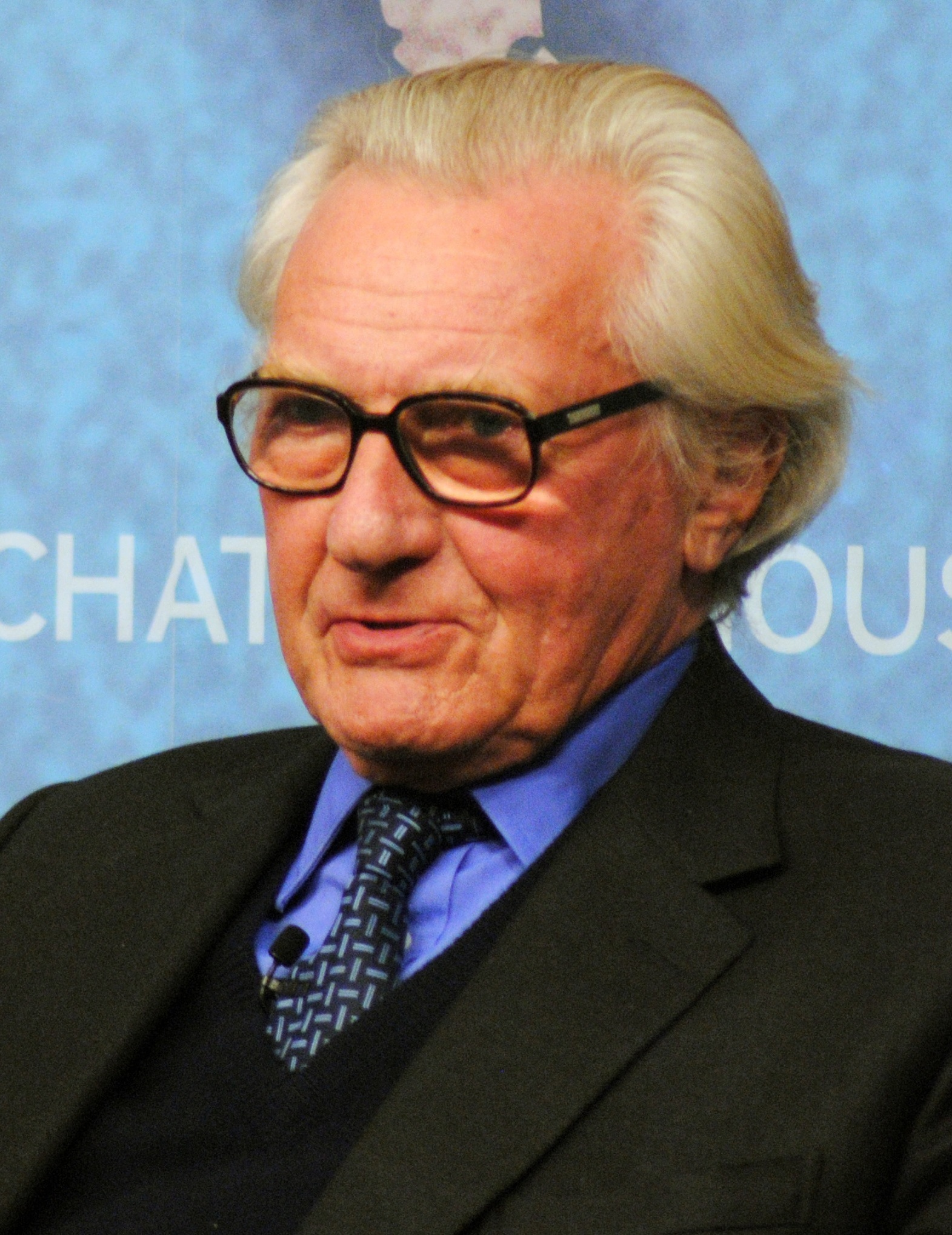
Michael Heseltine, 2013

- Sir Francis Drake (c. 1540 – 1596), explorer, privateer and mayor of Tavistock
- Henry Bourchier, 5th Earl of Bath (1587–1654), an English peer, Lord Privy Seal and a large landowner.
- William Browne (c. 1590 – c. 1645), an English pastoral poet and lawyer.
- John Maynard (1604–1690), lawyer and politician, local MP, 1656-1658 & 1679-1685 & 1689-1690.
- George Ponsonby (1755–1817), lawyer and politician. local MP, 1808–1812.
- Charles Grey, 2nd Earl Grey (1764–1845), politician, local MP in 1807 and PM from 1830 to 1834.
- Edward Atkyns Bray (1778–1857), poet, vicar, and miscellaneous writer; died locally.
- Anna Eliza Bray (1790–1883), historical novelist; she also wrote several non-fiction works; lived locally.
- John Russell, 1st Earl Russell (1792–1878), statesman, local MP & PM, 1846-1852 & 1865-1866.
- Mary Colling (1804–1853), poet and domestic servant.
- Admiral Lord Edward Russell (1805–1887), naval officer, politician and local MP 1841–1847.
- Sir Robert Phillimore, 1st Baronet (1810–1885), judge, politician and local MP, 1853 – 1857; the last Judge of the High Court of Admiralty
- Elizabeth Parsons (1812–1873), a British hymn writer.
- Elizabeth Charles (1828–1896), an English writer, the daughter of John Rundle, MP.
- Sir John Spear (1848–1921), politician and local MP 1900–1906 & 1910–1918.
- William Thomas Goode (1859–1932), academic, linguist and journalist for The Manchester Guardian
- Brigadier-General Wallace Duffield Wright, VC (1875–1953), soldier, awarded the Victoria Cross, and a politician and local MP 1928-1931.
- Ada Hitchins (1891–1972), principal research assistant of chemist Frederick Soddy, Nobel prize winner in 1921 for work on radioactive elements
- Sir Owen Morshead (1893–1977), Army officer, librarian and Royal Librarian from 1926 to 1958.
- Sir Henry Studholme, 1st Baronet (1899–1987), politician, MP for Tavistock from 1942 to 1966.
- Michael Heseltine (born 1933), politician and local MP, 1966–1974.
- Pete Quaife (1943–2010), bass player and co-founder of the Kinks.
- John Surman (born 1944), jazz saxophone, clarinet, and synthesizer player, and composer of free jazz and modal jazz.
- Steve Ridgway (born 1951), business executive, the CEO of Virgin Atlantic from 2001 to 2012
- Rosie Huntington-Whiteley (born 1987), an English model and actress, grew up on a local farm.

=== Sport ===
- Jack Hillman (1871–1952), football goalkeeper who played over 350 games and 1 for England
- Neil Langman (1932–2021), footballer who played 224 games
- Jack Davey (born 1944), cricketer who played 175 First-class cricket matches
- Michael Howat (born 1958), cricketer, played 26 First-class cricket matches.
- Graham Dawe (born 1959) a rugby hooker, played for Sale, Bath and England
- Angela Mudge (born 1970), a champion hill runner and skyrunner.
- Robbie Pethick (born 1970), football defender, played over 330 games.
- Rob Baxter (born 1971) played 275 game for Exeter Chiefs and an England rugby coach.
- Kate Allenby (born 1974), a modern pentathlete, she won a bronze medal at the 2000 Summer Olympics.
- Heather Fell (born 1983) a modern pentathlete, she won a silver medal at the 2008 Summer Olympics.

== See also ==
- Tavistock Canal
- South Devon and Tavistock Railway
- Tavistock (UK Parliament constituency)
- Exeter to Plymouth railway of the LSWR
