= Tamerton Foliot =

Village in Devon, England

Coordinates: 50.42792°N 4.15825°W

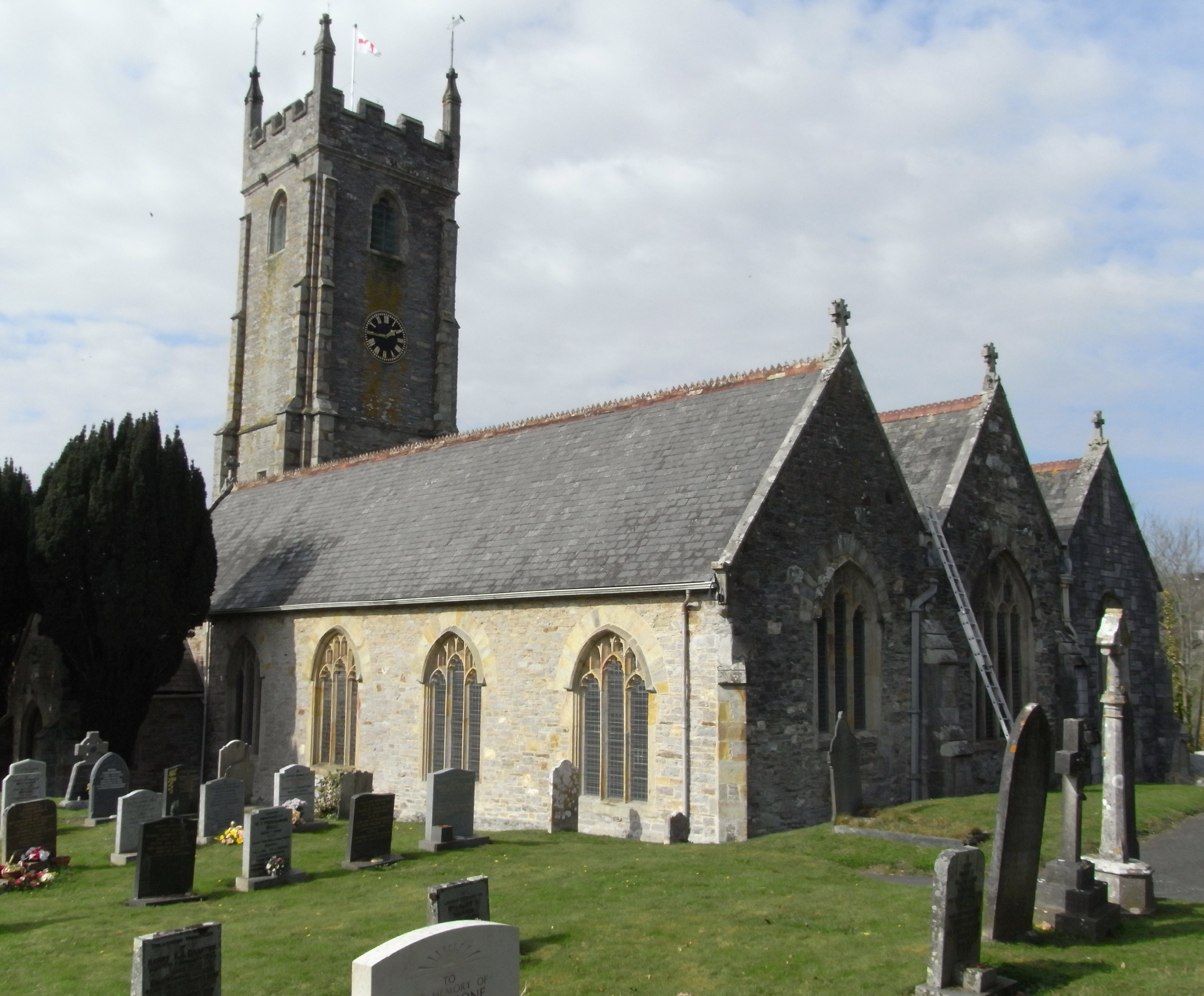
- St. Mary's Church, Tamerton Foliot, view from SE

- Location within Devon
- Unitary authority: Plymouth
- Ceremonial county: Devon
- Region: South West
- Country: England
- Sovereign state: United Kingdom
- Post town: PLYMOUTH
- Postcode district: PL5 4xx
- Dialling code: 01752
- Police: Devon and Cornwall
- Fire: Devon and Somerset
- Ambulance: South Western
- UK Parliament: Plymouth Moor View

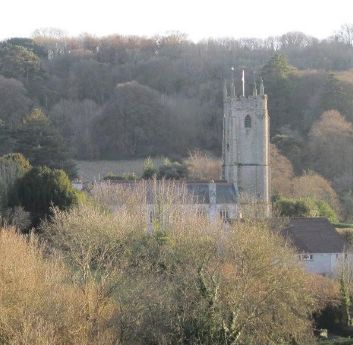
St. Mary's Church, view from north

Tamerton Foliot (/ˈtæmərtənˈfoʊliːət/) is a village situated in the north of Plymouth, in the Plymouth district, in the ceremonial county of Devon, England. It also lends its name to the ecclesiastical parish of the same name.

Situated near the confluence of the rivers Tamar and Tavy, the village is situated in a valley, the stream of which quickly broadens out to a large estuarine creek. This passes under a bridge beneath the Tamar Valley Line railway. Tamerton Foliot railway station, now a private property, is situated at the end of a two mile road and is on the edge of a heavily wooded riverside nature reserve. It had been built in 1890 by the Plymouth, Devonport and South Western Junction Railway on its line from Lydford to Devonport and Plymouth.

The village has a population of around 2,300 (2001 census) and has three pubs, one Methodist chapel (which closed in 2008) and the Anglican parish church of St Mary's. This dates from the 12th century, and is thought to be on the site of an earlier building perhaps founded by St Indract. It has been much extended since, with the 78-foot (24 m) perpendicular style tower added around 1440 and most of the rest of the fabric renewed in the 19th century. There is a peal of six bells.

In 1931 the civil parish had a population of 1232. On 1 April 1951 the parish was abolished and merged with Plymouth and Bickleigh.

== Copleston Oak ==
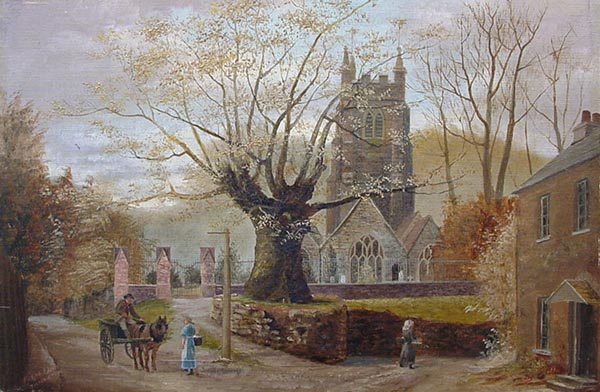
"Fatal Oak", oil painting circa 1900 by "S.G.M.", depicting the Copleston Oak next to St Mary's Church, Tamerton Foliot

Just outside the eastern boundary of the churchyard stands an ancient hollow oak tree called the Copleston Oak believed to date from the 17th century. It is named after a Lord of the Manor, perhaps Christopher Copleston (1524–1586) or according to Prince (d. 1723) John IV Copleston (1546/9 – 1608), whose monument is inside the church, who supposedly stabbed his godson to death outside the church following a dispute.

== Descent of the manor ==
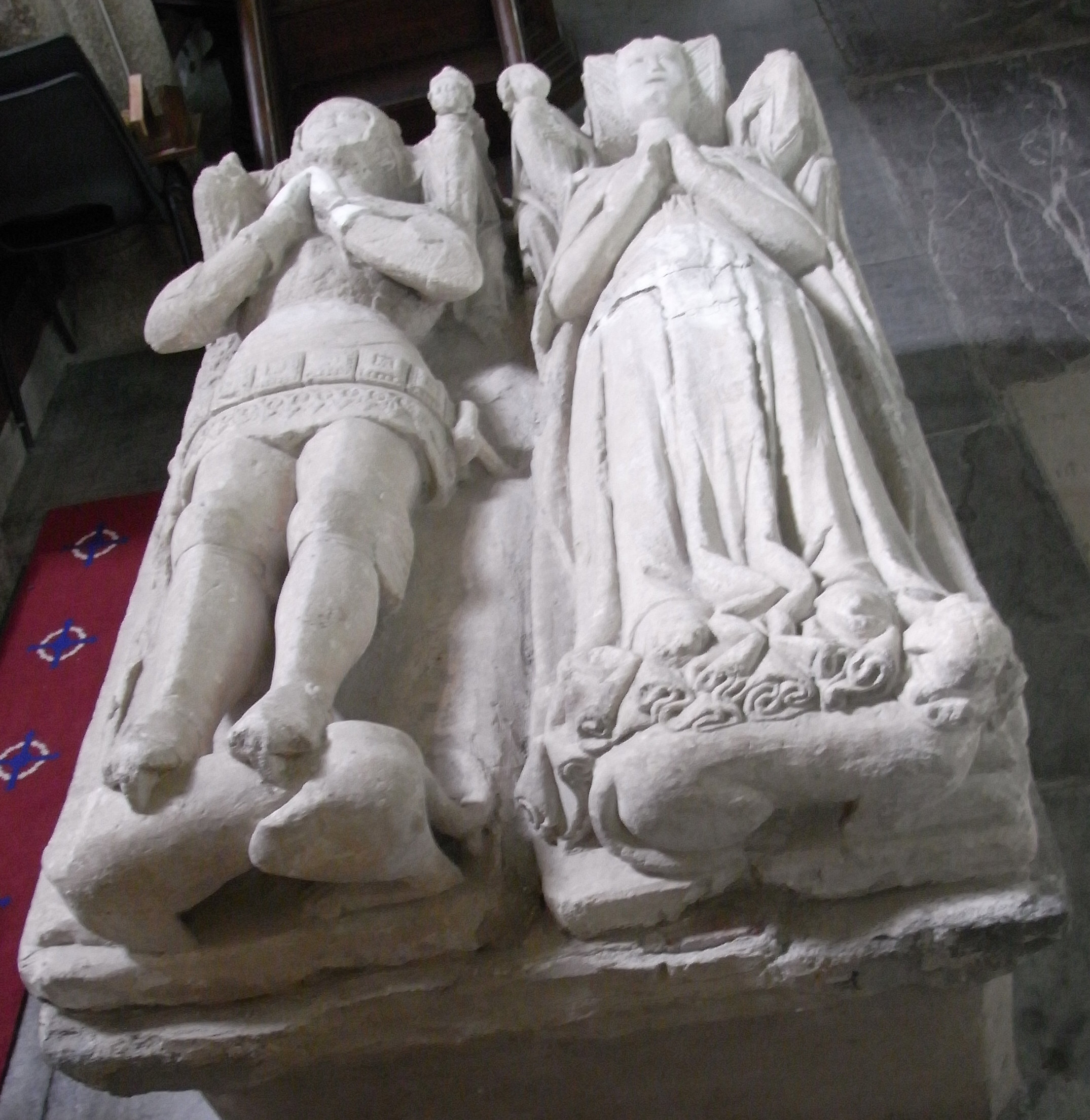
Gorges effigies, St Mary's Church

19th-century drawing of Gorges effigies, showing now lost armorial on knight's jupon

=== Foliot ===
The Foliot part of the village's name derives from the Foliot family, John Foliot being a half-brother of William the Conqueror and recipient of large amounts of land for services rendered during the Norman conquest. Some of these historical family names such as Bampfield Way and Copleston were used as street names in the new Southway Estate not far from the Village of Tamerton Foliot.

=== Gorges ===
The manor then passed into the hands of the Gorges family, one of whose members. In 1262, Ralph de Gorges had 2-1/2 knight fees in Tamerton Foliot, holding it under Baldwin de Redvers, Earl of Devon. William Gorges died without male heirs in 1294, at the time holding Tamerton of Hugh de Courtney with the fees of Petristavi, Midelton and Horsewell. His heir was his brother Thomas. Thomas Gorges, born about 1264, died in 1304. John de Gorges, born about 1299.

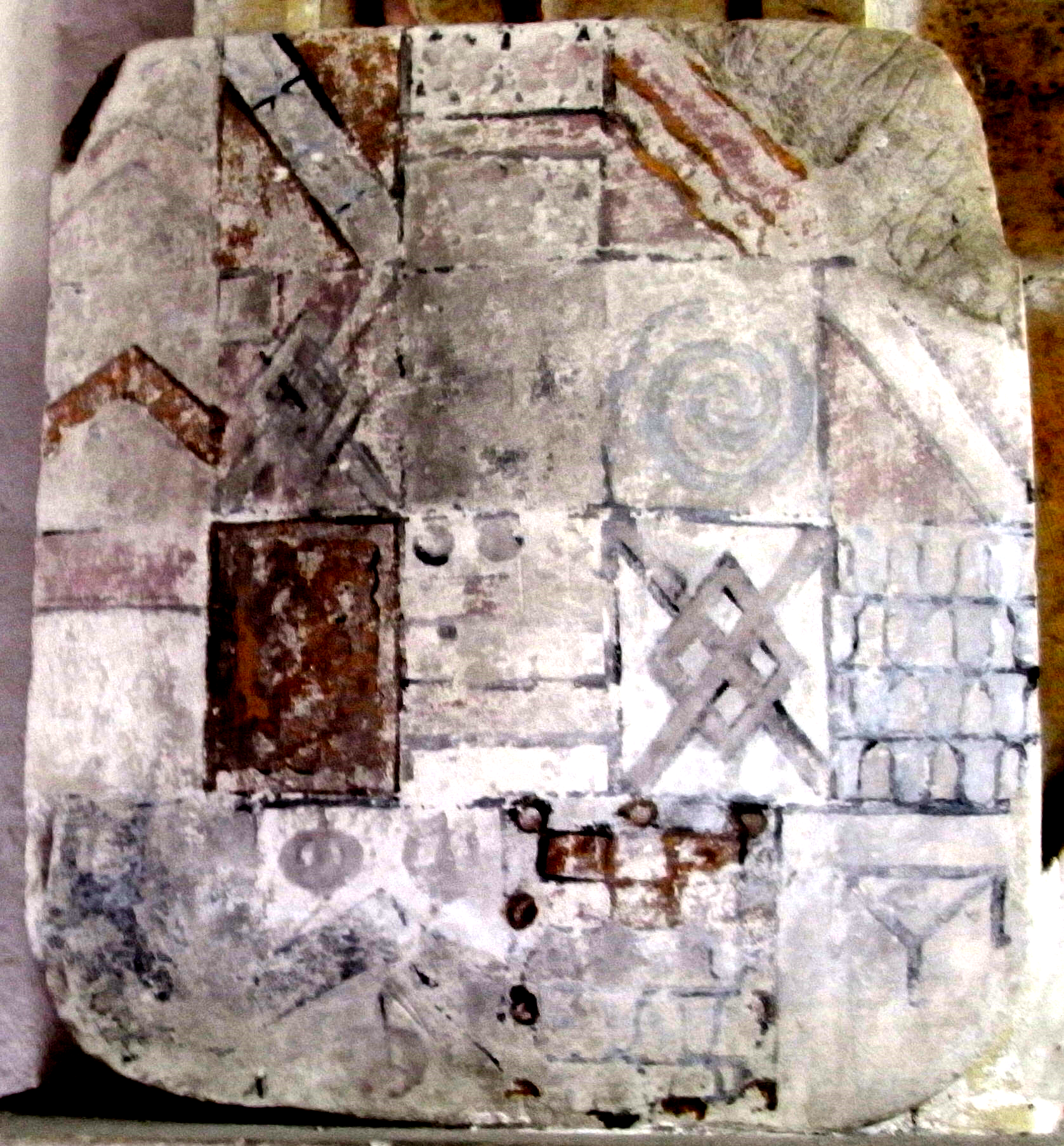
Quarterings on Copleston funerary monument, St. Mary's Church. The blue whirlpool of Gorges is visible as the 9th. "quarter"

One member of the family has a recumbent stone effigy in St Mary's Church. The effigies have been much damaged in the various fires which the church has suffered, most recently in 1981, when the roof of the north aisle fell over this area. The effigies are variously believed to be William de Gorges (d. 1346) or according to Raymond Gorges who wrote a history of the Gorges family in 1944, John Gorges of Warleigh House, lord of the manor of Tamerton Foliot, who flourished in the early 15th century. Formerly the Gorges heraldic canting arms of the Gurges, which is Latin for "whirlpool" could be seen on the front of the jupon of the knight in the form of 3 concentric annulets. No trace remains today. The armorial was borne in 2 forms, as 3 concentric annulets or as a whorl, blazoned thus: "Argent, a gurges azure". It was thus a blue device on a white background. The whorl form can be seen as one of the quarterings on the escutcheon on the funerary monument to John Copleston, Esquire (d. 1608).

=== Copleston ===
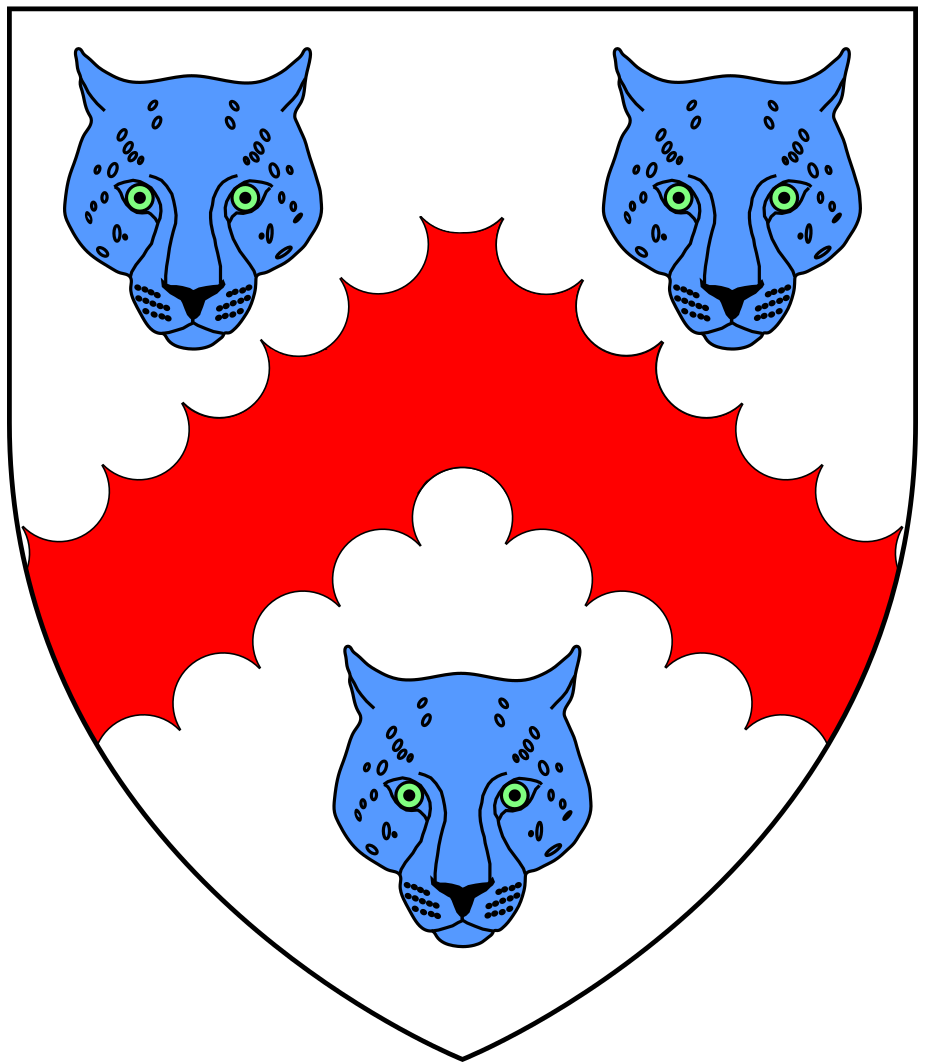
Arms of Copleston: Argent, a chevron engrailed gules between three leopard's faces azure

The Devon historian Tristram Risdon (d. 1640) wrote concerning the parish of Colebrooke:

In this tything is Coplestone, which hath given name to a numerous family who for their fair possessions, their port (sic) (report?) and the respect they lived in, were intitled "the Great Coplestones" besides dignified with the name of "Whit Spurrs", some time a title of great note and in these western parts of much esteem. Of this name are many branches sprung who flourished in this county

The Devon historian Sir William Pole (d. 1635) stated the honour accorded to this family as "Silver Spurr", similar to Risdon's appellation, and added that it was connected to the fact that although they were a great county family which had married well, unusually no member of the family had ever been knighted. For his great revenue one member of the family, Raphe Copleston (d. 1491), was called 'The Great Copleston'. The principal junior branches of the Copleston family were seated at the Devon manors or estates of: Bowden, Instow, Upton Pyne, Kingdon, Woodland, Weare Giffard, Eggesford and Bicton. Copleston House was stated by Prince (d. 1723) to be "all in ruines". The present Copplestone House, situated about 1/2 mile south-east of Copplestone Cross, was rebuilt after 1787 in the Georgian style by Robert Madge, who had purchased the estate at that date. It is thought to be on a different site to the old mansion of the Copleston family, but does incorporate some of the older fabric. The descent of Copleston of Tamerton Foliot was as follows:

==== Philip Copleston (fl.1472) ====
Philip Copleston of Copleston, Sheriff of Devon in 1472. He married Anne Bonville, daughter and heiress of John Bonville (1417–1494) of Shute, nephew of the great William Bonville, 1st Baron Bonville (1392–1461) of Shute. As Pole stated: "By this match of Bonvile's daughter the estate of Copleston was greatly augmented." Anne Bonville was heiress, from her maternal grandmother Leva Gorges, to the manor of Tamerton Foliot and her father John Bonville was, through his mother, the grandson and heir of Martin Ferrers.

==== Raphe Copleston (d. 1491) ====
Raphe Copleston (d. 1491) (son), according to Vivian (1895) called "The Great Copleston", on account of his great revenues. He married Ellen Arundell, daughter of Sir John Arundell of Lanherne, St. Mawgan-in-Pyder, Cornwall, from a leading Cornish family. In the Subsidy of 1434 his estate was assessed at £100 and he served in the honourable position of Justice of the Peace in 1451.

==== John III Copleston (1475–1550) ====
John III Copleston (1475–1550) (son) of Copleston, "The Great Copleston" according to Prince (d. 1723). He was co-heir of his great-grandfather John Bonville. His monument survives in Colebrooke Church. He married twice, firstly to Margaret St Ledger, daughter and co-heiress of Bartholomew St Ledger, which marriage was childless; secondly he married Katherine Bridges, daughter of Raphe Bridges.

==== Christopher Copleston (1524–1586) ====
Christopher Copleston (1524–1586) (son by his father's second marriage) of Copleston, Sheriff of Devon in 1560. He married twice: firstly to Mary Courtenay, daughter of George Courtenay (who predeceased his father Sir William III Courtenay (1477–1535) "The Great" of Powderham), which marriage was childless; secondly he married Jone Paulet, daughter of Sir Hugh Paulet (bef. 1510 – 1573) of Hinton St George, Somerset, Governor of Jersey.

==== John IV Copleston (1546/9 – 1608) ====
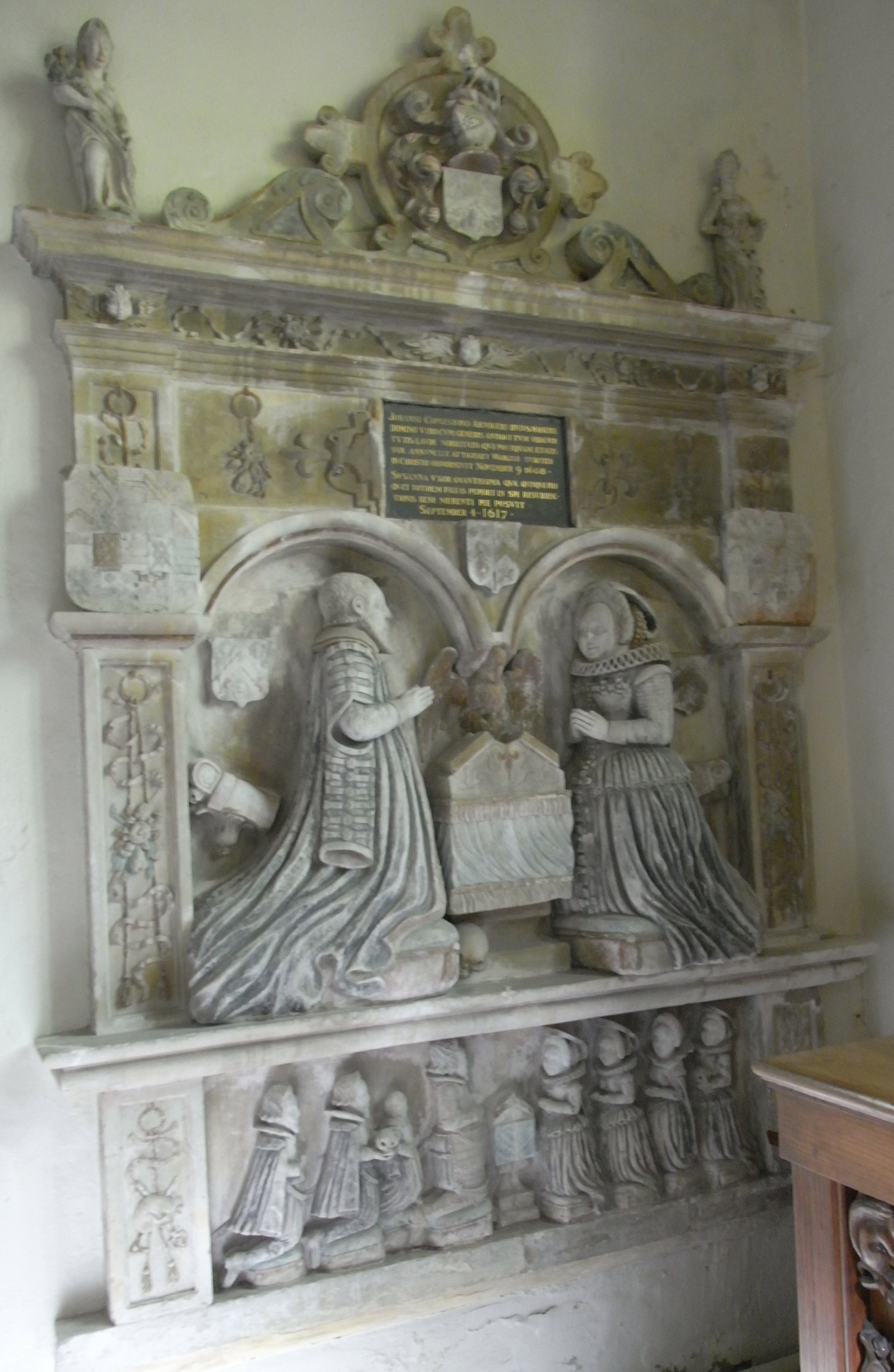
Monument to John Copleston (d. 1608) and his wife Susanna Pollard. St Mary's Church, Tamerton Foliot, north wall of chancel

John IV Copleston (1546/9 – 1608) (second son and heir, by father's second marriage) of Copleston, who married Susan Pollard, a daughter of Lewis II Pollard (d. bef. 1569) of King's Nympton, Recorder of Exeter and Sergeant-at-Law, grandson of Sir Lewis I Pollard (c. 1465 – 1526), Justice of the Common Pleas. The couple's monument, erected in 1617 and repaired in 1894, survives in St Mary's Church, Tamerton Foliot, inscribed in Latin as follows:

Johanni Coplestono Armigero huius manerie domino viro cum generis antiqui tum verae virtutis laude nobilitato: qui postquam aetatis suae annum LIX attigisset Warleiae suaviter in Christo obdormirvit, November 9, 1608. Susanna uxor amantissima quae quinque filios et totidem filias peperit in spe resurrectionis bene merenti pie posuit, September 4, 1617. ("To John Copleston, Esquire, lord of this manor, a man famed as greatly for true virtue as noble descent, who after he had reached his 59th year went to sleep gently in Christ at Warleigh, November 9, 1608. Susanna his most beloved wife who brought forth five sons and as many daughters placed this piously in well deserved hope of resurrection, September 4, 1617.")

===== Murder of godson =====
As related by Prince, John IV Copleston murdered his godson, possibly an illegitimate son, which "most unfortunate occurrence in this place of Tamerton...in all probability hastened the extinction of the name and family here and at Copleston also". The godson had been sent abroad for his education and when he returned home to England overheard his godfather's private conversation and reported it amongst his circle of friends, which action soon found its way by gossip back to his godfather, whose indignation was "exceedingly enkindled" and who exclaimed: "Must boys observe and discant on the actions of men and of their betters?", and thenceforth resolved and sought all opportunities to be revenged upon him. The two next met at Tamerton Foliot church during the Sunday service, and the youth fled before the end of the service, having noticed his godfather's angry look. Having received a message from his godfather that his anger was over and that he could return to church, the youth appeared at church the next week at the usual time. However Copleston's rage was not over, and although the youth had again fled before the end of the service, Copleston followed him and threw a dagger into his back, which killed him instantly. Copleston fled, and implored all his influential friends at the royal court to procure him a pardon from Queen Elizabeth, which eventually he received, but not without having had to pay a large fine which necessitated the sale of thirteen of his manors in Cornwall. This story is related by Prince, who heard it from a gentleman who was a neighbour of the Coplestons.

==== Amias Copleston (1581/2 – 1621) ====
Amias Copleston (1581/2 – 1621) (son) of Copleston. He was buried at Tamerton Foliot, the manor his ancestors had inherited by marriage to Anne Bonville. He resided at the former Gorges seat of Warleigh within that manor, and thus possibly had abandoned ancient Copleston as the family's principal seat. He married Gertrude Chichester (d. 1621), second daughter of Sir John Chichester (d. 1586), Sheriff of Devon in 1576, son and heir of Sir John Chichester (1519/20 – 1569) of Raleigh, from a leading family in North Devon.

==== John V Copleston (1609–1632) ====
John V Copleston (1609–1632) (son), who died aged 23 without progeny and was buried at Tamerton Foliot. He was the last of the family of Copleston of Copleston and Risdon wrote of him: "The heir male of this house was a hopeful young gentleman, lately dying issueless, who left his lands unto his two sisters, married into the families of Bampfield and Elford". By these heirs the manor of Copleston was sold in 1659. His two sisters and co-heiresses were:

  - Elizabeth Copleston (born 1608), the elder sister, who married (as his 1st of 4 wives) John Elford (1603–1678) of Sheepstor, near Buckland Monachorum in Devon, whose ruined manor house survives on the shore of Burrator Reservoir. Elizabeth had no male issue, only four daughters, including:
    - Gertrude Elford, who married Roger Wollocombe of Combe
    - Elizabeth Elford, who married Edmund Fortescue of London
    - Barbara Elford, who married Arthur Fortescue (1622–1693) of Penwarne, Cornwall, and of Filleigh, Devon, ancestor of Earl Fortescue

The manor of Copleston descended into the families of Wollocombe and Fortescue.

  - Gertrude Copleston (born 1611), the younger sister, who married in 1632 at Tamerton Foliot to Sir John Bampfylde, 1st Baronet (c. 1610–1650) of Poltimore and North Molton in Devon. She was the heiress of Warleigh and of the manor of Tamerton Foliot, which the Bampfylde family retained for several generations. Her son and heir was Sir Coplestone Bampfylde, 2nd Baronet (c. 1633 – 1692), MP and Sheriff of Devon.

=== Bampfield ===
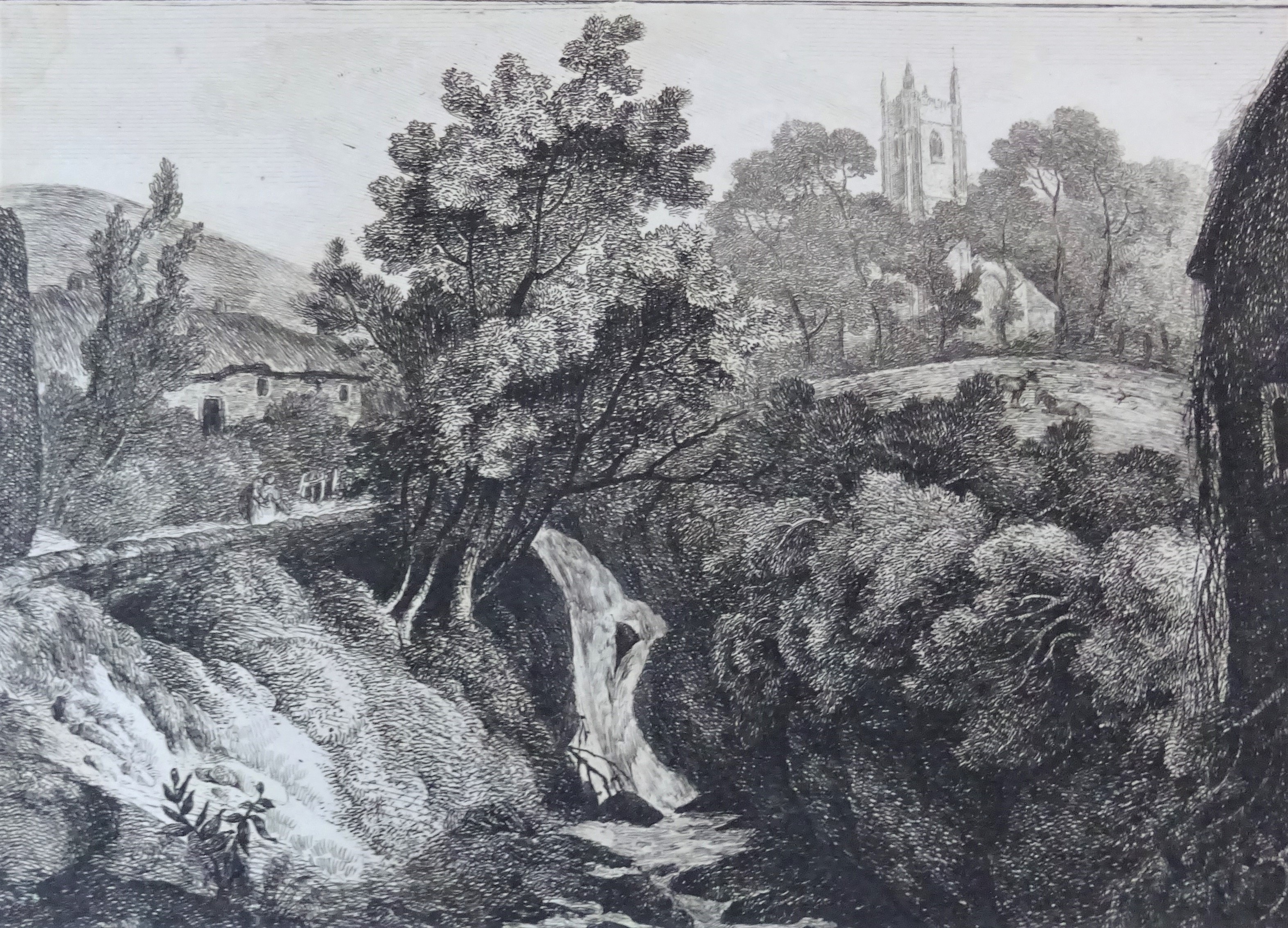
Tamerton Foliot in 1805

Sir John Bampfylde, 1st Baronet (c. 1610 – April 1650) of Poltimore and North Molton in Devon, inherited the manor of Tamerton Foliot by his marriage to Gertrude Coplestone (d. 1658), a daughter of Amias Coplestone (1582–1621) of Copleston and Tamerton Foliot and a co-heiress to her brother John V Coplestone (1609-1632). His eldest son and heir was Sir Coplestone Bampfylde, 2nd Baronet (c. 1633 – 1692), whose second son was Coplestone Bampfylde (1659–1669), a precocious scholar who died young aged 10 and whose monument survives on the south side of the chancel in St Mary's Church, Tamerton Foliot. His effigy is shown with hand on a book wearing a gown and band with a large bushy wig. Below are elaborate inscriptions in Latin and Greek.

=== Radcliffe ===
In 1741 the manor of Tamerton Foliot was sold by Sir Richard Bampfylde, 4th Baronet (1722–1767) to Walter Radcliffe, Esq., son of Walter Radcliffe, Esq., of Frankland, Sheriff of Devon in 1696, and ancestor of the Rev. Walter Radcliffe, the proprietor in 1822, who then resided at Warleigh, the ancient seat of the lords of the manor.

== Warleigh House ==
Warleigh is a Tudor manor house close by on the east bank of the River Tavy, formerly the home of John Copleston, Esquire (d. 1608). It is grade II listed. It is now situated within Bickleigh parish.

The original Warleigh House was built sometime between 1135 and 1154 by Sampson Foliot, whose manor of Tamerton for evermore became known as Tamerton Foliot. The family continued to own the estate until 1253, when it passed to the Gorges, who were, in any case, descended from Sampson Foliot. In 1435 other descendants, the Bonvilles, took over and they were followed by the Coplestones sometime around 1472, the Bampfyldes in 1631 and finally the Radcliffes in 1741.

As of 2012 Warleigh House is a Bed & Breakfast.

== Civil War ==
Tamerton Foliot was one of the quarters of Prince Maurice, the brother of Prince Rupert, when he besieged Plymouth from October to December 1643, during the Civil War. The Prince fell ill with camp fever in mid-November 1643 and withdrew from the siege to recover.

== Today ==
Tamerton Foliot today forms the northern border of Plymouth. The area suffered from flooding in November 2012 following torrential rain which made parts of the area "impassable".
