= Ford (Devon) railway station =

Former railway station in England

Ford (Devon)
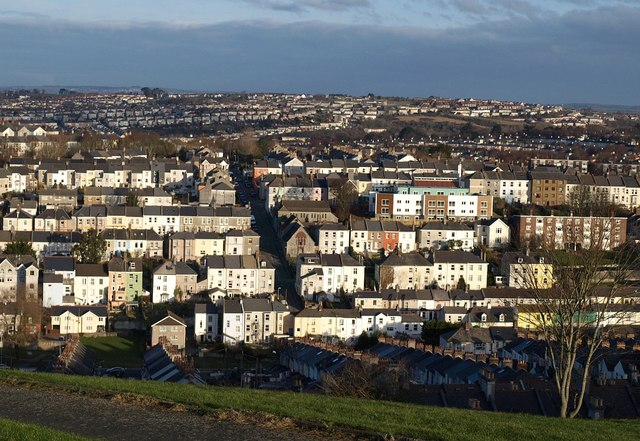
- Ford area, Plymouth

General information
- Location: Plymouth, Devon; England
- Coordinates: 50.386°N 4.172°W
- Grid reference: SX456562
- Platforms: 2

Other information
- Status: Disused

History
- Original company: Plymouth, Devonport and South Western Junction Railway
- Pre-grouping: London and South Western Railway
- Post-grouping: Southern Railway

Key dates
- 2 June 1890: Opened
- 9 July 1923: Renamed as Ford (Devon)
- 7 September 1964: Closed
Location

Ford (Devon) railway station was originally named Ford railway station and stood at the eastern end of Station Road, Keyham Barton in Plymouth, South Devon.

== History ==
Ford station was built by the Plymouth, Devonport and South Western Junction Railway Company and came into use when the line from Lydford to Plymouth was opened on Monday 2 June 1890. Ford was joined by a number of new halts in 1906 such as Weston Mill Halt and Camels Head Halt that were constructed to allow a suburban service to be operated between Plymouth Friary and St Budeaux for Saltash station in response to competition from tram lines. William Brown, from Gosport, was the first station master and for 30 years served at the station, retiring in 1920.

The station's name in the public timetables was changed to Ford (Devon) in July 1923 to prevent confusion with Ford station in Sussex, however the name board was never altered. In 1932 one goods train, the 8:12 am from Friary to Exmouth Junction Goods Yard, called between 8.50 and 9:05 am.

Goods and passenger traffic ceased from Monday 7 September 1964 along with the line between Devonport King's Road Station and St Budeaux Victoria Road Station.

== Infrastructure ==
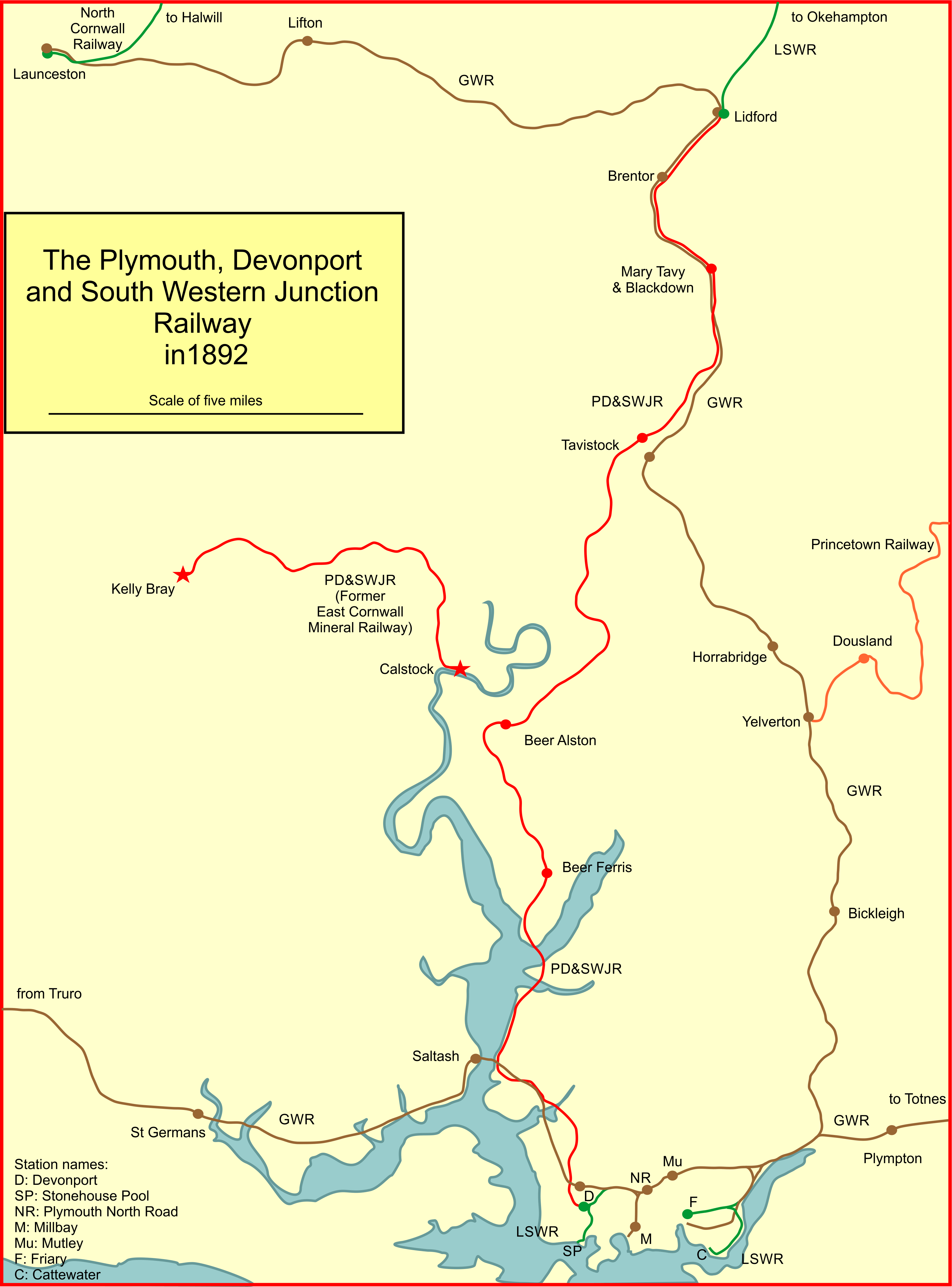
The Plymouth Devonport and South Western Junction Railway in 1892

The station stood on a double track line, partly in a cutting with two platforms, a concrete overbridge, a substantial station building with its booking office and facilities fronted by a canopy on the Down side and a small shelter on the Up. A siding, opened on Thursday 1 February 1900 to deliver bricks for the Keyham Barton housing scheme, branched off the Up line near the signal box and ran towards Ford Viaduct. Ford's Signal Box was opened on 12 May 1890 in conjunction with the first goods traffic and stood on the Up side of the line. By 1932 all of the track work relating to the single siding and the crossover had been lifted.

The old Ford Tunnel still runs beneath Victoria Place and has a stone lining with brick sections at both portal openings. The approach cutting was infilled to permit the construction of a blocks of flats.

Ford Tunnel

During removal of spoil from Viaduct embankments an infil was completed Raising former Trackbed by 12 ft . A access gate installed at Camperdown Street.  Tunnel portal gate with original gates .2000/01 Saw introduction of new Sewage main from King's Road to Camperdown Street site was totally cleared . Former Down line Raised by 5 ft to contain new Sewer .

Current Site condition is good condition Tunnel, Exmouth road portal has large white lines in Brick lining to indercate where current Mainline runs above. Gaining Access is Challenging as wild growth for 20 years blocks view of Pasley Street portal.

== The site today ==
Nothing remains of the station that was demolished in the 1970s and the old cutting infilled in the 1980s. Station Road remains as indication of Ford (Devon)'s existence.

Evidence of Former Exmouth concrete works iconic Concrete Fence panels still exist around station site and at Station Road. Standing where old foot Bridge was & looking at boundary fencing you can clearly make out the original cutting. The over bridge and cutting Filled in and landscaped 1989 . Spoil from Viaduct embankments and Viaduct itself used as infill .

== See also ==
- Exeter to Plymouth railway of the LSWR

Preceding station	Disused railways	Following station
Camels Head Halt	London Waterloo to Plymouth; Southern Railway (PD&SWJR)	Albert Road Halt
