= Tamerton Foliot railway station =

Former railway station in England

Tamerton Foliot
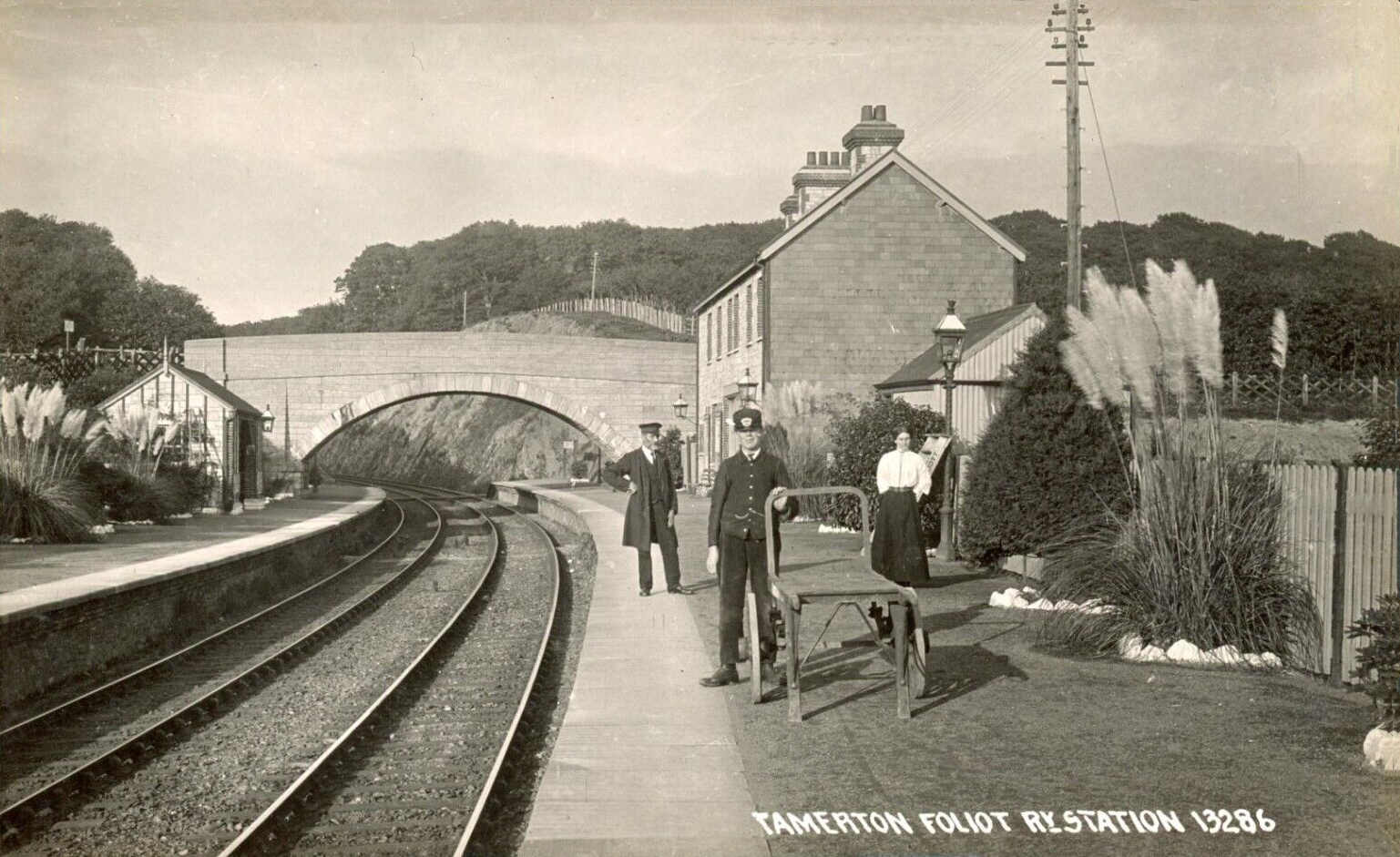

General information
- Location: Tamerton Foliot, South Hams; England
- Coordinates: 50.427°N 4.184°W
- Grid reference: SX449608
- Platforms: 2

Other information
- Status: Disused

History
- Original company: Plymouth, Devonport and South Western Junction Railway
- Post-grouping: Southern Railway

Key dates
- 22 December 1897: Station opened as Tamerton Foliott
- 1906: renamed Tamerton Foliot
- 1959: renamed Tamerton Foliot Halt
- 10 September 1962: Station closed
Location

Tamerton Foliot was a railway station, built by the Plymouth, Devonport and South Western Junction Railway (PDSWJR) on its line from Lydford to Devonport Kings Road and Plymouth Friary on the section that is now the Tamar Valley Line.

== History ==
The station was a later addition to the PD&SWJR route, the line having opened in 1890. The original intention had been to build a branch line to serve the village of Tamerton Foliot, but this scheme was not proceeded with, and a passenger only station on the main line was opened instead in 1897. The station was poorly situated, being more than 2 kilometres (1.2 mi) from the village, and was consequently very underused once Tamerton came to be served by buses from Plymouth. In 1936, Southern Railway figures showed it was the company's least used station west of Salisbury with less than 1000 passenger journeys in the year.

The station had two platforms and as well as the normal facilities of a booking office, parcels office, and waiting rooms, also had accommodation for a station master, although in later years the station was staffed by just a single porter and eventually became an unstaffed halt.

In the early years of the station there was a signal box at the station allowing the station to act as a block section between St Budeaux Victoria Road and Bere Ferrers, but the signal box and signalling had been removed by 1911.

The station closed in 1962.
