= Camels Head Halt railway station =

Disused railway station in England

Camels Head Halt

General information
- Location: Plymouth, Devon; England
- Coordinates: 50.395°N 4.174°W
- Grid reference: SX456572
- Platforms: 2

Other information
- Status: Disused

History
- Original company: Plymouth, Devonport and South Western Junction Railway
- Pre-grouping: London and South Western Railway
- Post-grouping: Southern Railway

Key dates
- 1 November 1906: Opened
- 4 May 1942: Closed
Location

Camels Head Halt railway station, named after a local public house in Plymouth, was opened as part of the city's suburban network by the London and South Western Railway in 1906, closing in 1942. It was located on the outskirts of the city in sight of the Great Western Railway main line that crossed the River Tamar by the Royal Albert Bridge.

== Infrastructure ==
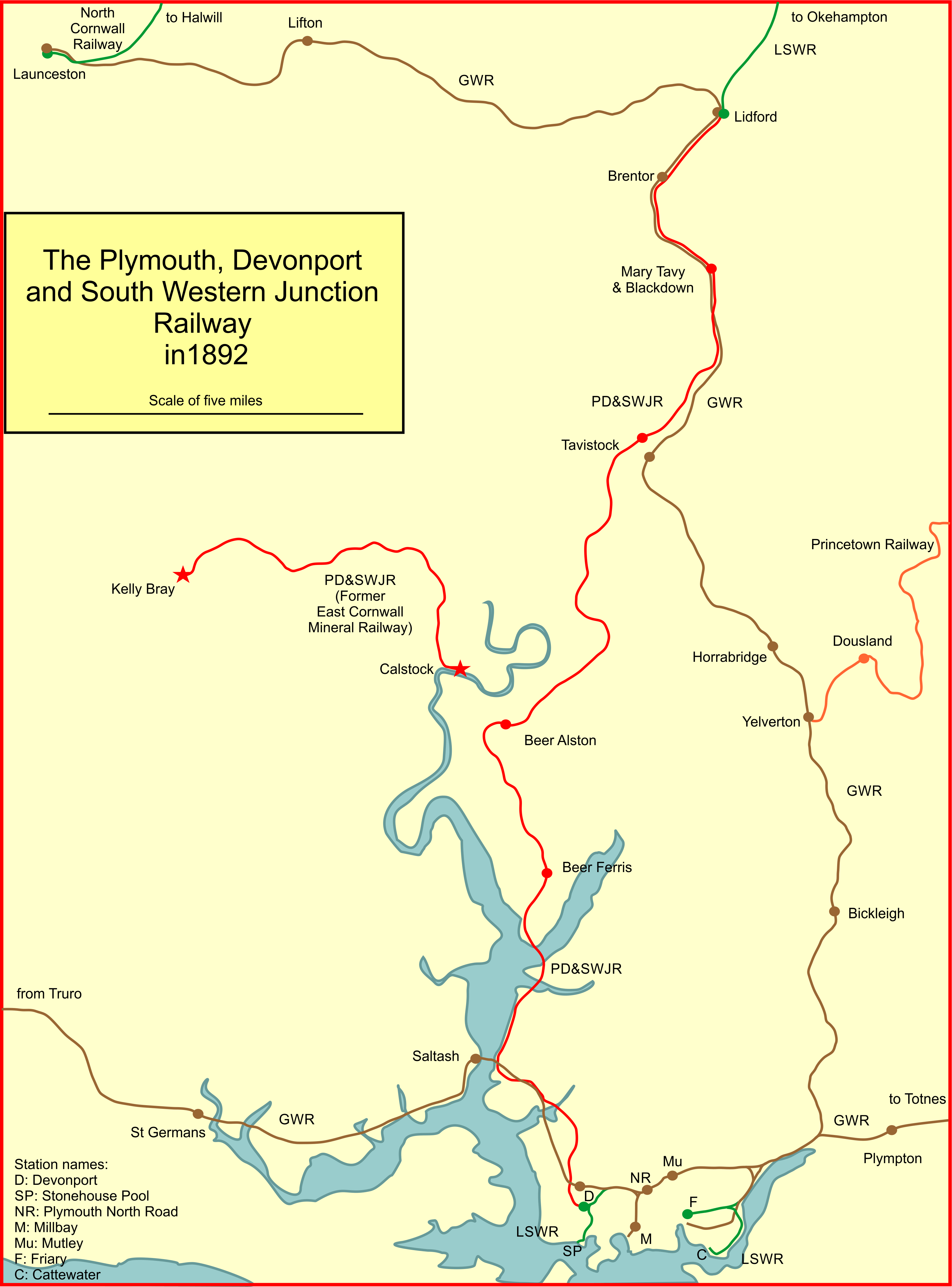
The Plymouth Devonport and South Western Junction Railway in 1892

As stated the halt was named after a local pub and although it officially opened on 1 November 1906 it may have had services from Wednesday 26 September when the suburban service was actually launched. This difference could be the result of a complaint by the Plymouth, Devonport and South Western Junction Railway to the London and South Western Railway that while they had constructed the halt, the LSWR had not provided any service, with a subsequent report that services commenced before the official opening date.

Camels Head Halt closed on the Sunday 4 May 1942. A 1964 photograph shows one platform, still with its nameboard, as a short wooden platform of a single carriage length, with fencing, ramps and no shelter. The halt was located on an embankment and the second similar platform was staggered, standing some distance away next to the road with a small brick built shelter and a second building, possibly a ticket office, backing on to the line. The Camels Head girder bridge stood close by on the route towards St Budeaux Victoria Road via Weston Mill Halt. Ford Station stood on the line to the east of the halt.

== History ==
Officially opening on 1 November 1906 as one of a number of new halts that were opened to allow a suburban service to be operated between Plymouth Friary and St Budeaux for Saltash station in response to competition from tram lines. Despite this initiative Camels Head closed on 4 May 1942. The 1964 photograph shows the station, still standing and it was still present in 1970, long after the closure and lifting of the line.

The halt was the site of the first death after the new Halts were opened in the Plymouth area when on Friday 9 November 1906 Edna Martin was killed whilst playing with her older brother Stanley Martin, aged 8. Both were truanting from Johnston Terrace Elementary School and she ran onto the line when a train was approaching.

The trains were third class only and no Sunday service was provided. In 1922 five to seven trains called in the Down direction and seven in the Up. In 1942, twenty years further on, only one Up and Down train called with two on Saturdays.

The wooden platforms supposedly posed a fire threat to the local houses and this was the official reason for the closure of the station, however this was over a year after the Blitz on Devonport and photographs show that the platforms were not removed at all during the time that the line was in use.

== The site today ==
Nothing remains of the station and most of the old line, bridges and embankments have been removed and built over.

== See also ==
- Exeter to Plymouth railway of the LSWR

Preceding station	Disused railways	Following station
Weston Mill Halt	London Waterloo to Plymouth; Southern Railway (PD&SWJR)	Ford (Devon)
