= Lydford Railway Ponds =

Protected area in Devon, England

Coordinates: 50°37′29″N 4°07′16″W

Lydford Railway Ponds is a Site of Special Scientific Interest (SSSI) within Dartmoor National Park in Devon, England. It is located 700 metres (770 yd) south of Lydford Gorge, at the site of the abandoned Lydford railway station. Wetland habitat has formed between the abandoned railway platforms and this site is protected because of the wetland plants and the dragonfly species recorded here.

== Biology ==
Plant species that have become established at this abandoned railway station include yellow rattle, bird's-foot trefoil, purging flax and common knapweed. Wetland plant species include angelica, hemp agrimony, fleabane, southern marsh-orchid and in pools of water, bog pondweed became established.

Dragonfly species recorded at Lydford Railway Ponds SSSI include small red damselfly, ruddy darter, ischnura and emperor dragonfly.

== Management advice ==
The British Dragonfly Society has regularly surveyed this protected area and found that the area of open water has declined.
