= Liddaton Halt railway station =

Disused railway station in Devon, England

Coordinates: 50.6254°N 4.1714°W

Liddaton Halt

General information
- Location: Liddaton, West Devon; England
- Grid reference: SX465828
- Platforms: 1

Other information
- Status: Disused

History
- Post-grouping: Great Western Railway

Key dates
- 4 April 1938: Opened
- 31 December 1962: Closed to passengers
Location

Liddaton Halt was a railway station opened in 1938 by the Great Western Railway to serve the hamlet of Liddaton that lies between Coryton and Lydford in West Devon, England.

== History ==
The halt was opened at a later date than most of the stations on the line from Plymouth to Launceston which had itself opened in 1865.

== Description ==
The single platform's original construction was an open wooden structure with a small wood built shelter, one oil lamp and a single platform name board. An overbridge lay at the Coryton end of the platform. The track was single with no passing loop or sidings.

Preceding station	Disused railways	Following station
Lydford	British Rail Western Region; Launceston Branch Line	Coryton

== See also ==
South Devon and Tavistock Railway
