= Albert Road Halt railway station =

Disused railway station in Devonport, Plymouth

Albert Road Halt

General information
- Location: Devonport, Plymouth; England
- Coordinates: 50.3777°N 4.1736°W
- Grid reference: SX455553
- Platforms: 2

Other information
- Status: Disused

History
- Original company: Plymouth, Devonport and South Western Junction Railway
- Pre-grouping: Plymouth, Devonport and South Western Junction Railway
- Post-grouping: Southern Railway

Key dates
- 1 November 1906: Station opened
- 13 January 1947: Station closed
Location

Albert Road Halt was a railway station in Plymouth in the English county of Devon. It was located in a deep cutting between Ford and Devonport Park tunnels.

== History ==
The station was opened by the Plymouth, Devonport and South Western Junction Railway on 1 November 1906, or possibly 1 October 1906. This confusion may be the result of a complaint by the PDSWJR to the London and South Western Railway in September 1906 that while they had constructed the halt, the LSWR had not provided any service, and it is reported that services commenced before the official opening of 1 November.

Although this company remained independent until the grouping, the LSWR used its tracks as an entry to Plymouth that did not involve its rival the Great Western Railway. Becoming part of the Southern Railway during the Grouping of 1923, it closed on 13 January 1947, less than a year before nationalisation.

== The site today ==
The station has now been demolished.

== See also ==
- Devonport Albert Road (GWR station)
- Exeter to Plymouth railway of the LSWR

Preceding station	Disused railways	Following station
Ford (Devon)	London Waterloo to Plymouth; Southern Railway (PD&SWJR)	Devonport Kings Road
