= Bridestowe railway station =

Disused railway station in England

Coordinates: 50.66567°N 4.092158°W

Bridestowe
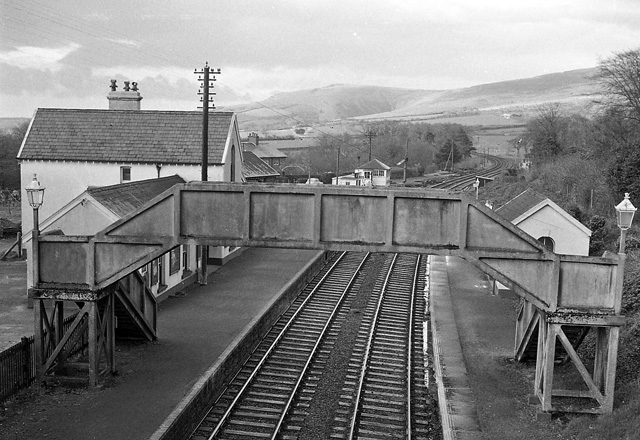
- Bridestowe station in 1964.

General information
- Location: Bridestowe, West Devon; England
- Platforms: 2

Other information
- Status: Disused

History
- Pre-grouping: London and South Western Railway
- Post-grouping: Southern

Key dates
- 12 October 1874: Opened
- 5 June 1961: Closed to goods
- 6 May 1968: Closed to passengers
Location

Bridestowe railway station served the 2 miles (3.2 km) or so distant village of Bridestowe in West Devon, England, located outside Okehampton on the edge of Dartmoor.

== History ==
It was built by the Okehampton Railway, an independent company that was supported by the London and South Western Railway (LSWR). On 17 July 1862 the company was authorised to build a line from Coleford Junction near Crediton, to Okehampton. Before construction began the line was leased to the LSWR and an extension authorised to Lidford. This was almost the highest point on the LSWR line.

Renamed as the Devon and Cornwall Railway and construction began in 1864 and the line to Lidford was opened on 12 October 1874. Lidford was renamed as Lydford on 3 June 1897. The Devon and Cornwall Company was taken over by the LSWR in 1872, which was in turn incorporated into the Southern Railway in the grouping of railways in 1923.

When rabbit warrening was an important rural industry on Dartmoor, Bridestowe sent away annually many more rabbits than passengers, mostly to London. It was used by several Dartmoor mining industries and also the Rattlebrook Peatworks which closed in 1921; it was an ordnance depot during the Second World War. The Goods Yard closed in 1961 and the staffed became unstaffed in September 1965. The station was closed in 1968 together with the stretch of line from Okehampton to Bere Alston.

Since closure the disused railway station has been converted to a private dwelling.

Preceding station	Disused railways	Following station
Lydford	Exeter to Plymouth; London and South Western Railway	Okehampton
