= White Spur (esquire) =

Hereditary title in Devonshire

The historic title White Spur (alias Silver Spur) was a rare variety of English esquire in Devonshire (and possibly the wider West Country).

It was defined by John Weever (d.1632) in his Antient Funeral Monuments and paraphrased from there by John Prince (1643–1723) in his Worthies of Devon, (within his biography of John Copleston "The Great Copleston", Esquire (1475–1550)). Weever classed it as the fourth of five categories of esquires in existence.

The title White Spur was an hereditary title of honour, passed via heirs male of the family, made by creation of the king. The ceremony was as follows: the king would place a Collar of Esses (or SSS) around the recipient's neck and confer upon him a pair of silver spurs. The holders of this title were thus distinguished from knights of the class Eques Auratus (literally "Golden Knights"), who were entitled to wear gilt spurs.

== Usage ==
The form of usage or style was: "(Surname) the White Spur" (e.g. "Copleston the White Spur").

== White Spur families ==
The title White Spur was very rare and only three families are known to have held it, one in modern times:

- Copleston of Copleston in the parish of Colebrooke, Devon. Unusually for such an ancient, prominent and wealthy family, no knighthood was ever conferred on any member, and Prince stated that in place of the honour of knighthood "They rather contented themselves with an hereditary title of honour, given them, 'tis said, only in this county, and now long since worn out of date, being wont to be stiled "Copleston the white-spur". The Devon historian Tristram Risdon (d.1640) wrote thus of the family of Copleston:

"...who for their fair possessions, their port and the great respect they lived in were intitled "the great Coplestones", besides dignified with the name of Whitspurrs, some time a title of great note and in these western parts of much esteem"

The Devon historian Pole (d.1635) stated of the Copleston family:

"...They grewe unto greatness & albeit they had great marriages in lands, yeat hath not any of that famyly bine knighted & therefore they received the name of Silver Spurr & for their great revenue called "the great Copleston".

- Winslade of Winslade in the parish of Buckland Brewer, Devon and of Tregarrick in Cornwall
- Wollocombe of Wollocombe ("Over Wollocombe" in the parish of Morthoe) in Devon, identified by Samuel Kent in his 1726 abridgement of The Banner Display'd by John Guillim (d.1621)
