= Weston Mill Halt railway station =

Former railway station in England

Weston Mill Halt

General information
- Location: Plymouth, Devon; England
- Coordinates: 50.398°N 4.180°W
- Grid reference: SX451576
- Platforms: 2

Other information
- Status: Disused

History
- Original company: Plymouth, Devonport and South Western Junction Railway
- Pre-grouping: London and South Western Railway
- Post-grouping: Southern Railway

Key dates
- 1 November 1906: Opened
- 27 June 1921: Closed
Location

Weston Mill Halt railway station was named after a mill and quay with its lime kiln sitting on Weston Mill Lake next to the River Tamar. The small settlement of Weston Mill also lay near by and the halt was opened as part of Plymouth's suburban network development, together with other halts such as the nearby Camels Head Halt, by the London and South Western Railway in 1906, closing in 1921 or Sunday 4 May 1942. It was located on the outskirts of the city not far from the Great Western Railway main line's Weston Mill Bridge.

== Infrastructure ==
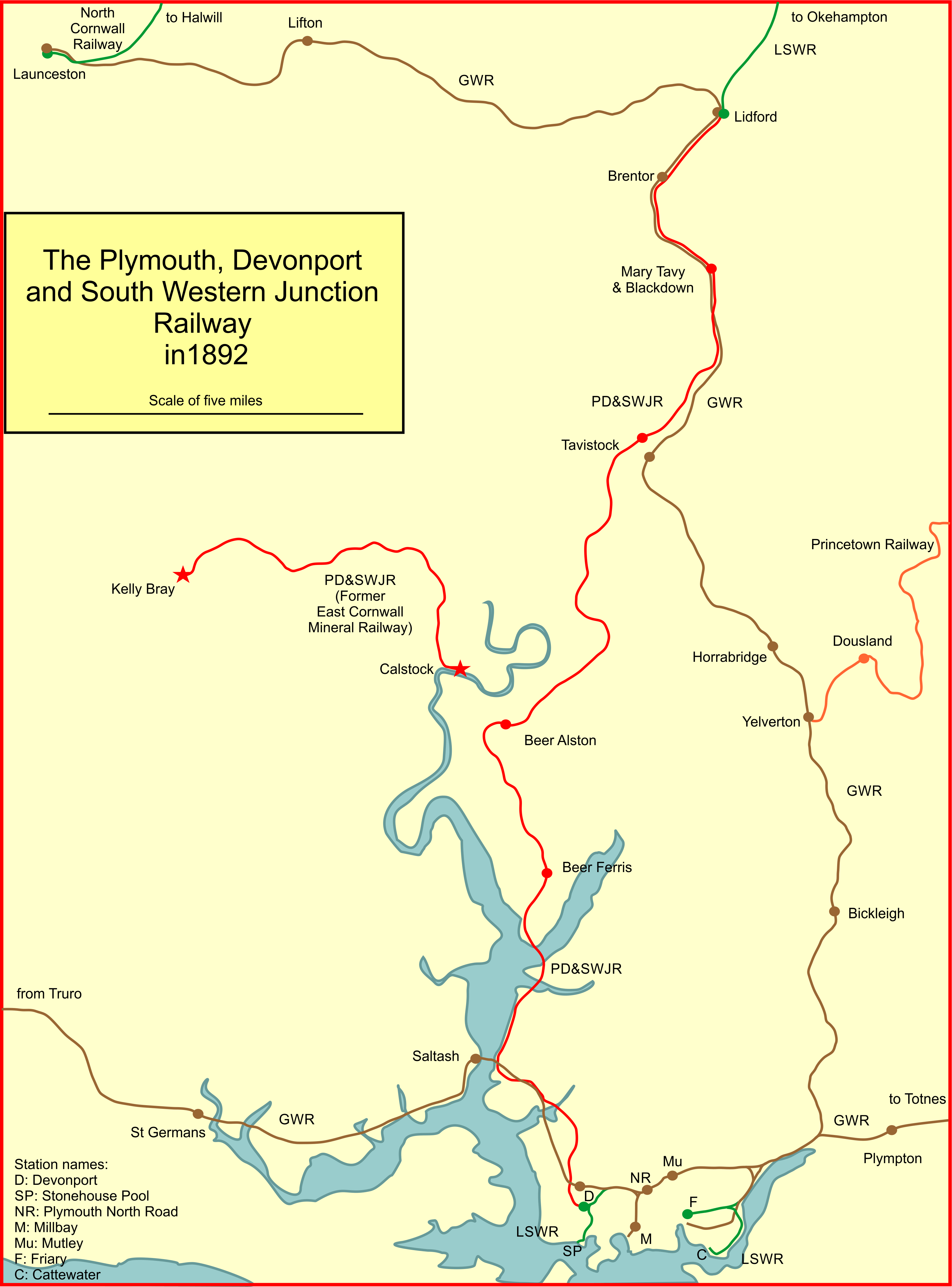
The Plymouth Devonport and South Western Junction Railway in 1892

As stated the halt, with the entrance on Bridewell Road, was named after a well known local mill where housing developments had taken place and although it officially opened on 1 November 1906 it may have had services from Wednesday 26 September when suburban service was launched. Some disagreement exists over its closure date that is variously recorded as being from the 27 June 1921, 14 September 1921 or even Sunday 4 May 1942.

Like Camels Head Halt, Weston Mill was probably built as two short wooden platforms of a single carriage length, with fencing and ramps with a shelter on a double track section of line. The halt was located in a cutting, now infilled. On the route west St Budeaux Victoria Road was the next station and was only a quarter of a mile distant, and Camels Head Halt stood on the line to the east of the halt, barely a quarter of a mile away.

== History ==
Weston Mill was held by Weston Peverel in the Parish of Pennycross and was one of the oldest mill in the Plymouth area with a deed of Geoffrey de Weston.

The halt officially opened on 1 November 1906 although services may have operated as early as 30 September 1906 as the result of a complaint by the Plymouth, Devonport and South Western Junction Railway to the London and South Western Railway that month that while they had constructed the halt, the LSWR had not provided any service, with a subsequent report that services commenced before the official opening date.

Weston Mill Halt was one of a number of new halts that were constructed to allow a suburban service to be operated between Plymouth Friary and St Budeaux for Saltash station in response to competition from tram lines. Weston Mill Halt always suffered from a severe lack of patronage and as stated closed in either 1921 or 1942, the former being more likely. The trains on the line were third class only and no Sunday service was provided. The wooden platforms posed a fire threat to the local houses and if the closure was in 1942 rather than 1921 then this would have been a part of the reason.

== The site today ==
Nothing remains of the old mill, quay, station, etc. and most of the old line's cuttings, etc. have been infilled or removed and built over.

== See also ==
- Exeter to Plymouth railway of the LSWR

Preceding station	Disused railways	Following station
St Budeaux Victoria Road Station	London Waterloo to Plymouth; Southern Railway (PD&SWJR)	Camels Head Halt
