= Lydford railway station =

Disused railway station in Devon, UK

Coordinates: 50.6247°N 4.1211°W

Lydford
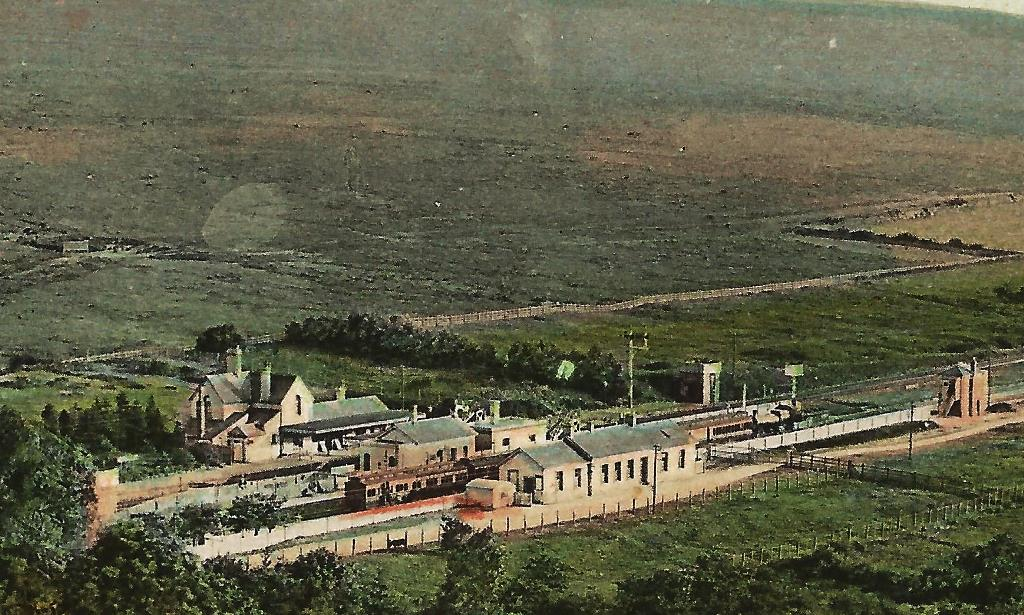
- Lydford station with a GWR train in the platform

General information
- Location: Lydford, West Devon; United Kingdom
- Platforms: 4

Other information
- Status: Disused

History
- Opened: 1 June 1865
- Closed: 6 May 1968
- Former names: Lidford
- Original company: Launceston and South Devon Railway
- Pre-grouping: London and South Western Railway
- Post-grouping: Southern

Key dates
- 3 June 1897: Station renamed Lydford
- 7 September 1964: Goods traffic ceased
- 6 May 1968: station closed
Location

Lydford railway station was a junction at Lydford between the Great Western Railway (GWR) and London and South Western Railway (LSWR) situated in a remote part of north-west Dartmoor in Devon, England.

== History ==
The station, known then as "Lidford", was opened on 1 June 1865 with the Launceston and South Devon Railway, a 7 ft (2,134 mm) broad gauge line that connected with the South Devon and Tavistock Railway to offer a service to Plymouth Millbay railway station. This line eventually became a part of the GWR.

On 12 October 1874 the LSWR line was opened from Okehampton railway station. This was a 4 ft 8 1/2 in (1,435 mm) standard gauge line that carried trains direct from London Waterloo station, whereas passengers to the GWR's London Paddington station had to travel on the branch line to Plymouth and then change onto a main line train.

On 17 May 1876 a junction was opened between the two lines and LSWR trains could then reach its new station at Devonport by running over the GWR's route, which was mixed gauge. On 1 June 1890 a new line, built by the Plymouth, Devonport and South Western Junction Railway, gave the LSWR a route to Devonport independent of the GWR. The GWR line was converted to standard gauge on 20 May 1892.

The connection between the two lines was removed in 1895 but was replaced in 1943 to give flexibility should the railway lines around Plymouth be damaged by World War II bombing. Other connections were installed at Launceston railway station and at St Budeaux.

The station had been renamed "Lydford" on 3 June 1897. Trains were withdrawn from the former GWR branch on 31 December 1962 but continued on the main line until 6 May 1968. Goods traffic ceased on 7 September 1964.

== Description ==
The original station had a passing loop and two platforms, with the station offices on the platform used by trains towards Plymouth. The LSWR built their platforms alongside the original ones, so the original booking office became a waiting room on an island platform with both companies opening new offices on their respective outside platforms.

From 1 March 1914 the LSWR took responsibility for the GWR platforms. The GWR signal box was closed on 8 January 1917, when signal controls were combined in a single box on the central platform with two lever frames – one for each line – placed back to back. The signalman had trains from Tavistock on his left when working the GWR frame, but on his right when working the LSWR one. There was road access to only the GWR station, so passengers using the LSWR station had to use a foot crossing over the GWR lines to access the island platform, and then over the footbridge to gain access to the LSWR down platform.

Goods traffic was handled in a yard at the north end of the station between the two lines with access from both.

Preceding station	Disused railways	Following station
Brentor	London and South Western Railway Exeter to Plymouth Line	Bridestowe
Mary Tavy and Blackdown	Great Western Railway; Launceston Branch Line	Liddaton Halt

== Site of Special Scientific Interest ==
Part of the former station site was designated as a Site of Special Scientific Interest in 1986 because pools of water that had formed at the site contained notable wetland plants and dragonfly species. This protected area is designated as the Lydford Railway Ponds.
