= St Budeaux Victoria Road railway station =

Railway station in Devon, England

St Budeaux Victoria Road
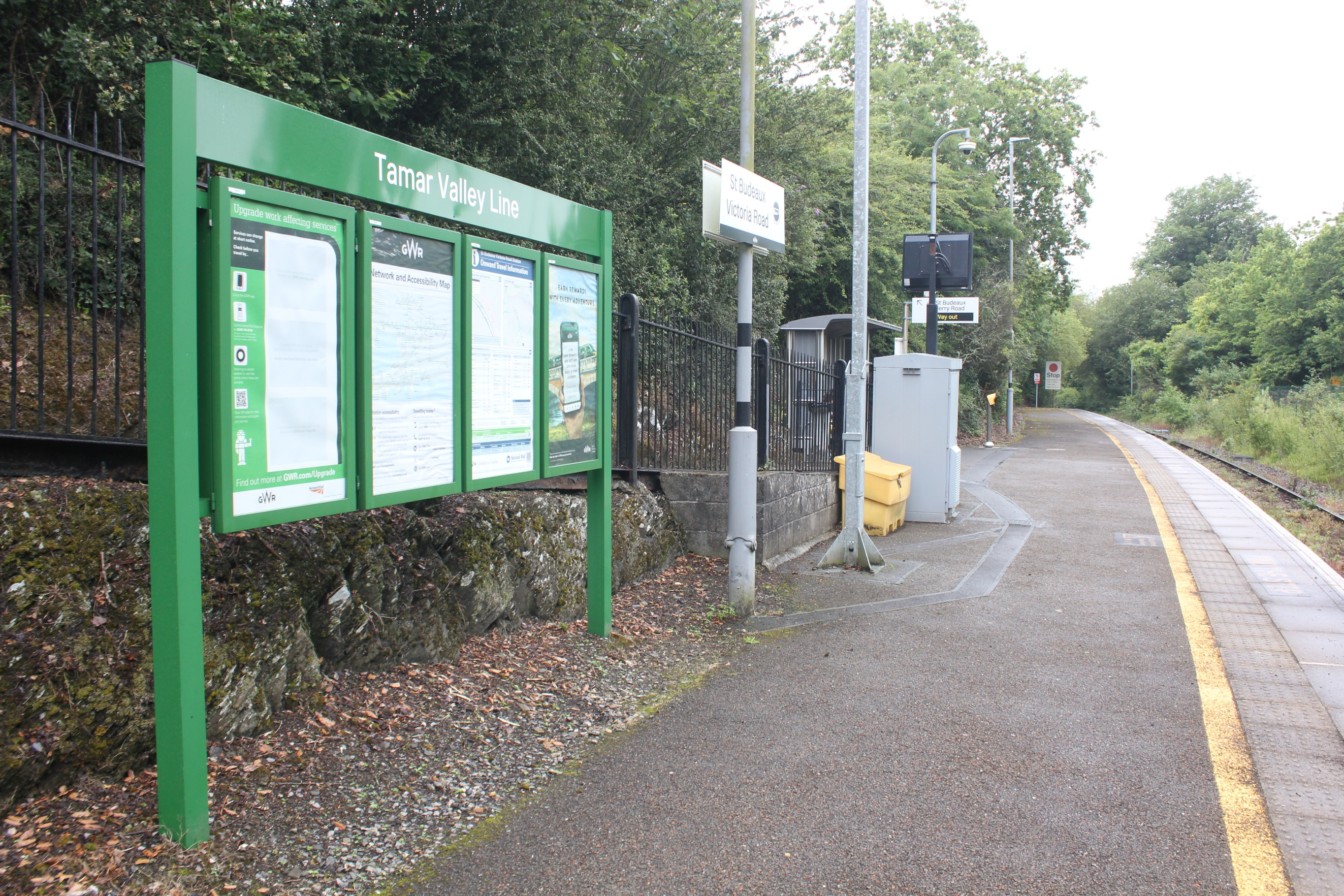
- St Budeaux Victoria Road in 2026

General information
- Location: St Budeaux, Plymouth; England
- Coordinates: 50.402°N 4.188°W
- Grid reference: SX446581
- Manager: Great Western Railway
- Platforms: 1

Other information
- Station code: SBV
- Classification: DfT category F2

History
- Opened: 1890

Passengers
- 2021/22: ▲6,516
- 2022/23: ▲8,098
- 2023/24: ▲10,190
- 2024/25: ▲11,864
- 2025/26: ▲12,224
Location
Notes
- Passenger statistics from the Office of Rail and Road

St Budeaux Victoria Road railway station is a suburban station in St Budeaux, Plymouth, Devon, England. The station is managed and served by Great Western Railway.

== History ==
The Plymouth, Devonport and South Western Junction Railway (PDSWJR) opened its St Budeaux station on 2 June 1890 with its main line from Lydford to Devonport which gave the London and South Western Railway a route into Plymouth that was independent of the Great Western Railway.

The Great Western Railway opened its own station at St Budeaux on 1 June 1904, the entrance being across the road from the PDSWJR station. Weston Mill Halt opened between St Budeaux and Devonport in 1906 but was closed in 1921.

A connection to the Great Western Railway was installed east of the station on 21 March 1941 to allow the two companies alternative routes between Plymouth and St Budeaux should either line be closed due to bombing during World War II. The two stations at St Budeaux were renamed on 26 September 1949 to distinguish them, the formr LSWR station becoming 'St Budeaux Victoria Road'. The original line into Devonport was closed on 7 September 1964 and all trains from Victoria Road used the wartime connection onto the Great Western Railway line to reach Plymouth.

== Facilities and location ==
There is a single platform, on the left of trains arriving from Plymouth, with step-free access from Wolseley Road. It is a mileage point 227 miles 2 chains (365.4 km; 227.03 mi) (measured from London Waterloo via Tavistock), which is 3 mi 52 ch (5.9 km; 3.65 mi) from Plymouth on the current route.

== Services ==
The station is on the Tamar Valley Line from Gunnislake to Plymouth. Services run on a generally two-hourly frequency in each direction on weekdays with just five each way on Sundays throughout the year and one additional Sunday evening service running between May and mid-September. There is also a limited service between Plymouth and Penzance from the adjacent St Budeaux Ferry Road railway station.

Preceding station	National Rail	Following station
Bere Ferrers towards Gunnislake	Great Western Railway Tamar Valley Line	Keyham towards Plymouth

== Signalling ==
Trains heading towards Bere Alston must collect the branch train staff from a secure cabinet on the platform before proceeding, as the line is operated on the one train working system with only a single unit allowed on the branch at a time. Conversely, the staff has to be returned to the cabinet by the driver on the return journey before the unit can leave the branch and return to Plymouth.

== Community railway ==
The Tamar Valley Line is designated as a community railway and is supported by marketing provided by the Devon and Cornwall Rail Partnership. Two pubs on the banks of the River Tamar at St Budeaux are part of the Tamar Valley Line rail ale trail, which is designed to promote the use of the line.

== See also ==
- Exeter to Plymouth railway of the LSWR
