= Devonport Kings Road railway station =

Disused railway station in Devon, England

Devonport Kings Road
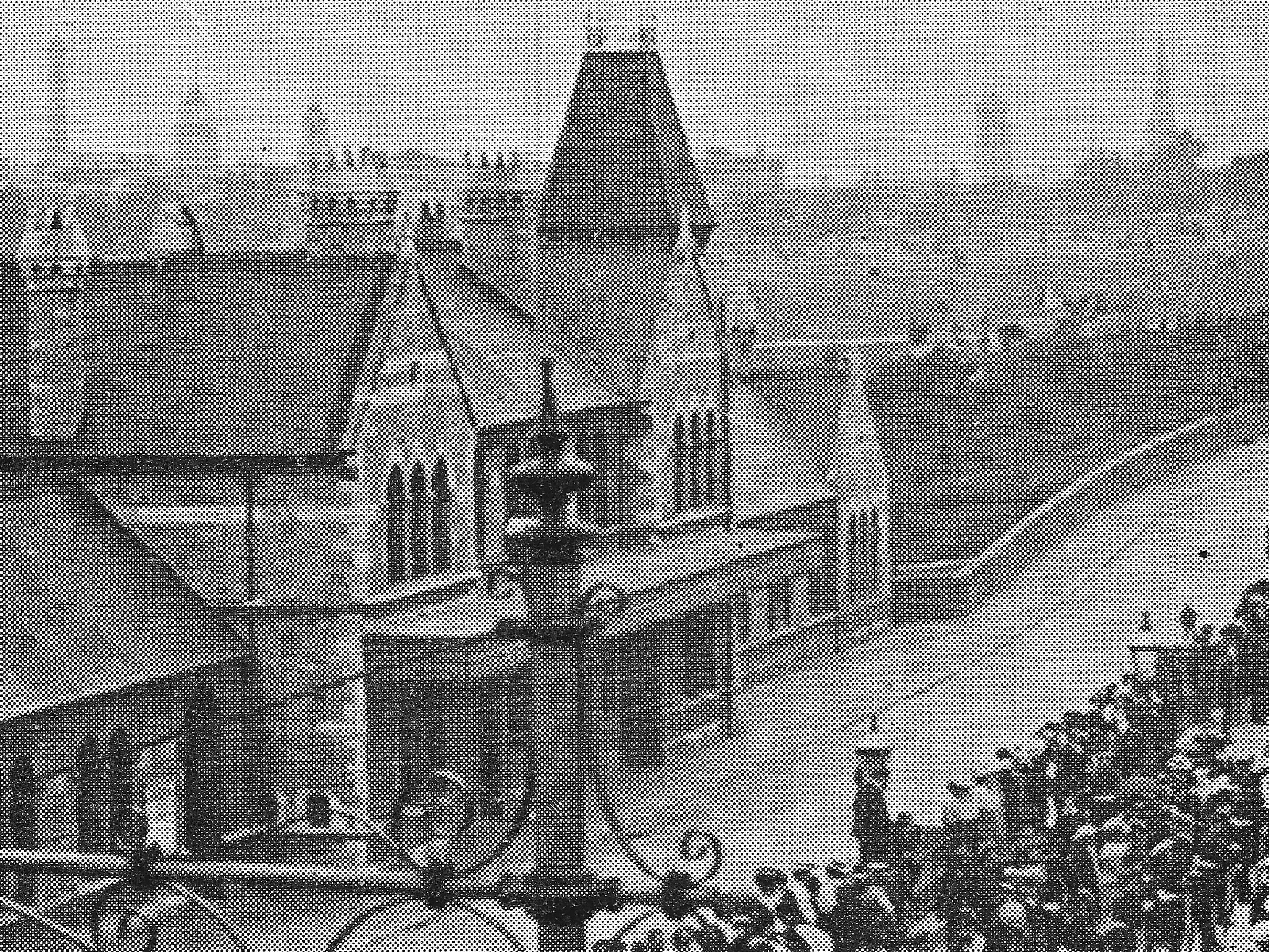
- The station in 1905

General information
- Location: England
- Platforms: 2

Other information
- Status: Disused

History
- Pre-grouping: London and South Western Railway
- Post-grouping: Southern Railway; British Railways

Key dates
- 17 May 1876: Opened
- 26 September 1949: Renamed Devonport Kings Road
- 7 September 1964: Closed
Location

Devonport Kings Road railway station was the London and South Western Railway station in Devonport, Devon, England. It opened in 1876 and closed in 1964. For the first 14 years it was a terminal station with trains to London departing eastwards, but from 1890 it became a through station with trains to London departing westwards.

== History ==
London and South Western Railway (LSWR) trains first arrived at Plymouth on 17 May 1876, entering the town from the east. To get there trains had travelled over the company's line as far as Lydford railway station, then over the Great Western Railway's Launceston branch via Tavistock and the South Devon main line to Mutley railway station, and then a short section of the Cornwall Railway to reach Devonport Junction near the west end of Pennycomequick Viaduct on the new Cornwall Loop Line. From here trains ran on a short LSWR branch line to its Devonport and Stonehouse terminal.

The station was a large building facing Paradise Road near the junction with Kings Road. A tall tower was part of the main building which stood on the departure platform. The departure and arrival platforms and two sidings between were covered by two substantial train sheds with wide glazed arches at the end. The goods yard was situated to the south of the passenger station.

A route independent of the Great Western was established on 1 June 1890 when the Plymouth, Devonport and South Western Junction Railway was opened from Lydford to Devonport. This route entered the station from the west through Devonport Park Tunnel and a bridge beneath Paradise Road. Now trains from London arrived from the opposite direction and so used the platform next to the main station offices. Trains then continued to North Road, Mutley and, eventually, the LSWR's new terminal at Plymouth Friary.

The train sheds were destroyed in the World War II Blitz but the station remained in use. New canopies were erected after the War but the tracks were left open to the elements.

The "and Stonehouse" was dropped from the name quite early on, but from 26 September 1949 the station was known as Devonport Kings Road in order to distinguish it from the Western Region station at Devonport Albert Road.

The station closed on 7 September 1964 when the remaining trains were diverted over the Western Region route to St Budeaux. Goods traffic continued until 7 March 1971. The station was demolished and the City College Plymouth has been built on the site. The approach road still drops down from Paradise Road and the wall is still topped by the LSWR's decorative railings, and the stone bridge still supports Paradise Road.

Preceding station	Disused railways	Following station
Albert Road Halt	London and South Western Railway – Exeter to Plymouth railway of the LSWR	Plymouth North Road
Ocean Quay	London and South Western Railway – Stonehouse Pool branch	Terminus

== Ocean Quay ==
Located at 50.3650°N 4.1673°W

A 63 ch (1.3 km) branch from Devonport goods yard to Stonehouse Pool was opened for goods traffic in 1876 and completed the following year. This started next to the signal box and dived down a steep gradient to pass beneath the goods shed in a tunnel. It then ran alongside Kings Road, crossed beneath the junction of Stonehouse Bridge, Devonport Hill and Richmond Walk, to terminate on the waterside opposite Admiral's Hard slipway. From 1893 the LSWR started to attract passengers from trans-Atlantic liners and on 9 April 1904 it opened a two-platform Ocean Quay station at Stonehouse Pool, with a 350 ft (110 m) platform, 2 waiting rooms and a customs hall.

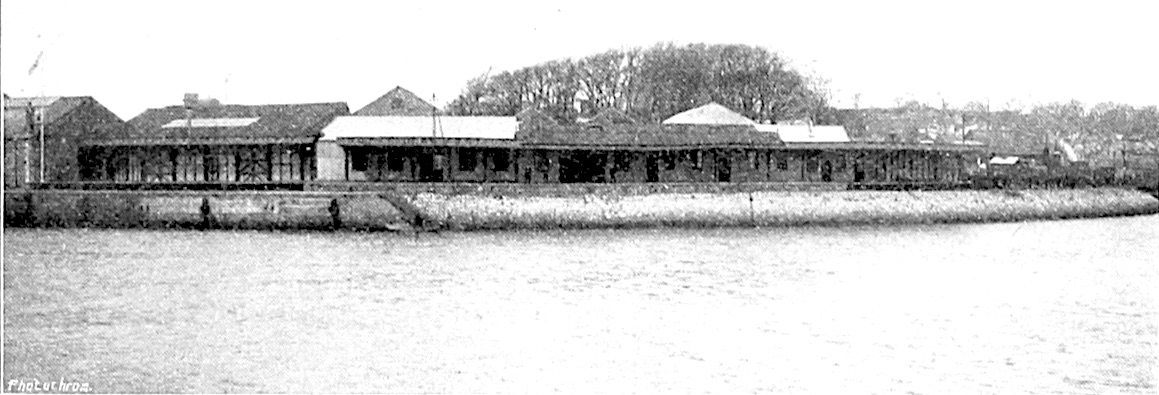
The station opened in 1904 with the flagpole on the left flying the American Line flag for the passengers on the St Louis, which had arrived 4 hours early

The GWR continued to hold the contract for carrying mail from the liners to London, but a number of the liner companies arranged for the LSWR to carry their passengers. This caused a race for the fastest train to London with fatal consequences. On 9 May 1904 City of Truro was the first locomotive recorded in excess of 100 mph while working one of the GWR's trains, with the whole journey to London taking just 3 hours 54 minutes. The GWR route was shortened by 20¼ miles on 1 July 1906 with the opening of the Castle Cary Cut-Off line that avoided the "Great Way Round" through Bristol Temple Meads, but in the early hours of 30 June 1906 an LSWR special had derailed at high speed passing through Salisbury railway station, after which speeds returned to a more sedate pace, with trains taking around five hours.

The traffic never lived up to the LSWR's expectations so it closed Ocean Quay on 28 May 1910, after which all ocean traffic was handled by the GWR from Millbay Docks. The line remained open for freight traffic until 30 May 1970 although the last train had run in 1966.

== Signalling ==
The signal box was situated at the east end of the station to the south of the line where there was a good view of the yard and station throat. In 1890 it had 29 levers but this was increased to 37 in 1904. It closed on 14 March 1965.

A small signal box was installed at Ocean Quay in 1885 where it controlled the yard and the level crossing over Richmond Walk. It was taken out of use a couple of years after passenger trains ceased running.

== See also ==
- Railways in Plymouth
