= Railways in Plymouth =

Overview of railways in Plymouth, Devon, England

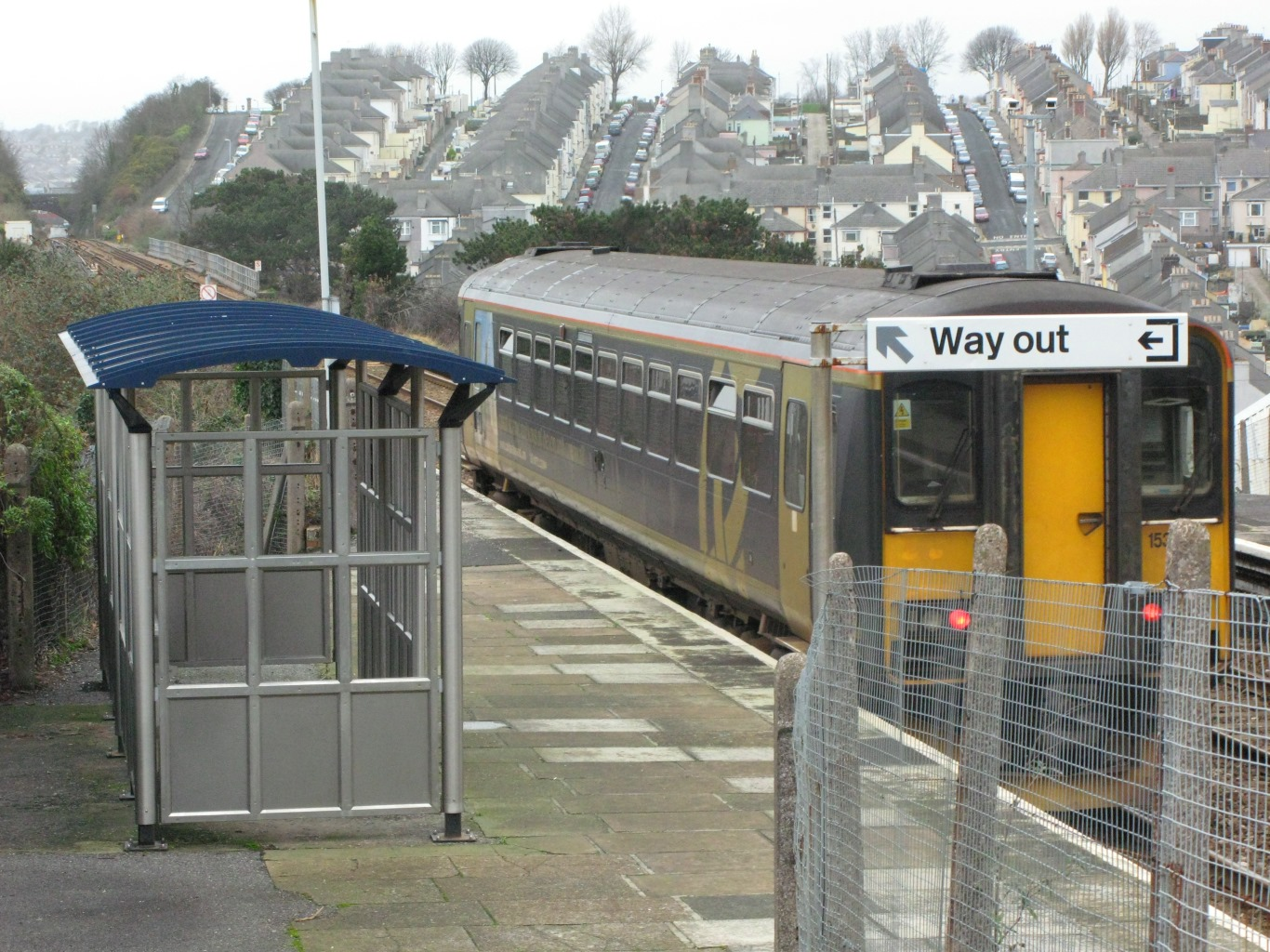
153380 in Devon and Cornwall Rail Partnership livery pulls away from Dockyard railway station

The network of railways in Plymouth, Devon, England, was developed by companies affiliated to two competing railways, the Great Western Railway and the London and South Western Railway. At their height two main lines and three branch lines served 28 stations in the Plymouth area, but today just six stations remain in use.

== History ==
The first uses of railway in the area were wooden rails used during the construction of docks facilities. Some were in use in the Naval Dockyard in 1724, and in 1756 John Smeaton laid some more to help move materials in his workyard on the mainland which was preparing stonework for the Eddystone Lighthouse. In 1812 John Rennie laid a 3 ft 6 in (1.07 m) gauge metal tramway to help with the construction of the Plymouth Breakwater; rails were laid in the quarry at Oreston and on the breakwater, and loaded wagons were conveyed between the two on ships.

A more conventional tramway was opened on 26 September 1823. The 4 ft 6 in (1.37 m) Plymouth and Dartmoor Railway ran from Princetown to Sutton Harbour and the Cattewater. Branches were opened to Cann Quarry in 1829 and to Plympton in 1834, followed by the Lee Moor Tramway in 1854. Haulage on these lines in Plymouth was always by horses and the Lee Moor line remained in use until 1960.

=== Broad gauge lines ===
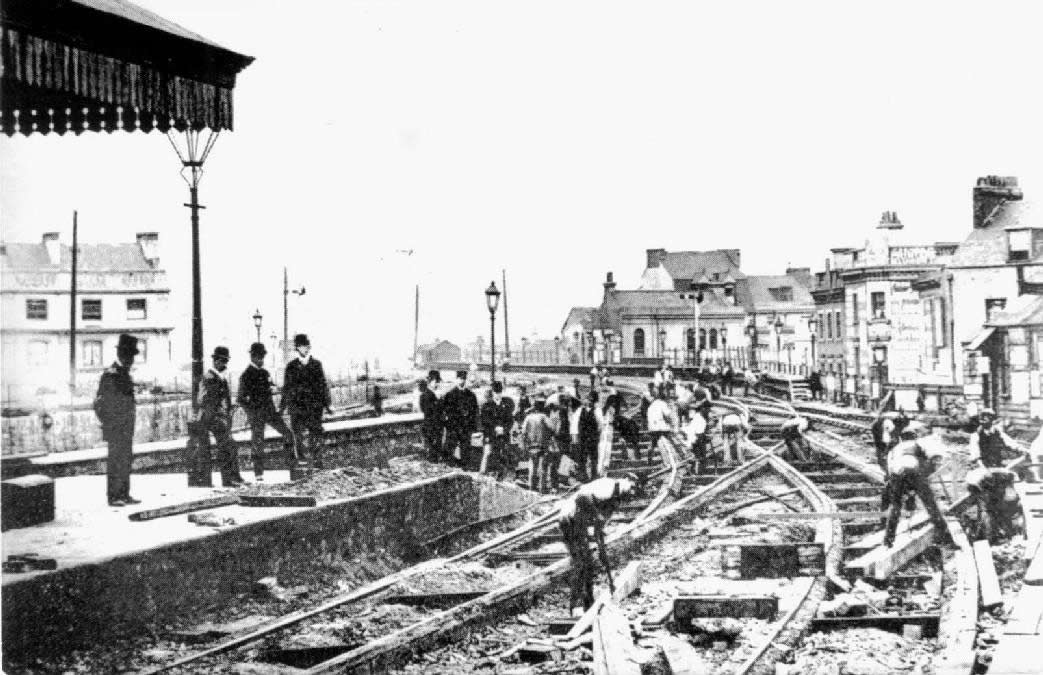
Converting the gauge at Millbay, 21 May 1892

The first main line railway to arrive was the South Devon Railway (SDR), which brought its line from Exeter to a temporary terminus as Laira on 5 May 1848. The line was a 7 ft (2,134 mm) broad gauge line backed by the Great Western Railway (GWR) and was completed to Millbay on 4 April 1849, although it had originally been conceived that the terminus would be on the high ground at Eldad. A siding into the Plymouth Great Western Docks was opened from Millbay station in 1850.

The SDR was authorised by act of parliament to construct a branch from Millbay to Devonport which would have been more convenient for the naval dockyards but instead the powers were transferred to the Cornwall Railway (CR). This was another broad gauge line which was originally designed to cross the River Tamar on the Torpoint Ferry but these plans were thrown out by Parliament and so Isambard Kingdom Brunel designed the Royal Albert Bridge to carry the line instead. Construction was protracted due to a lack of finance but the railway eventually opened on 4 May 1859.

The South Devon and Tavistock Railway (SD&TR) was opened a few weeks later on 22 June 1859 and was extended by another company to Launceston on 1 July 1865. In 1867 a short branch was laid from the CR at Keyham to connect with the rail system in the Naval Dockyard, where permanent rails had been in use since at least 1860.

The SD&TR was amalgamated with the SDR on 1 July 1865, and the SDR in turn was amalgamated with the GWR on 1 February 1876. The CR, however, remained nominally independent of the GWR until 1 July 1889 although the GWR already held a large number of shares.

=== London & South Western ===
The 4 ft 8 1/2 in (1,435 mm) standard gauge London and South Western Railway (LSWR) arrived in Plymouth on 18 May 1876. Initially their trains arrived over the SD&TR line, along which a third rail had been laid to allow mixed gauge working, to call at Mutley before continuing on the new Cornwall Loop Line and a new branch to their own station at Devonport. A new joint station was opened at Plymouth North Road on 28 March 1877.

These arrangements changed on 2 June 1890 when the Plymouth, Devonport and South Western Junction Railway (PDSWJ) opened a new line from Lydford along the Tamar valley. LSWR trains now ran through Devonport, North Road and Mutley in the opposite direction, and soon continued to a new terminus at Plymouth Friary which opened on 1 July 1891.

A branch across the River Plym to Plymstock opened on 5 September 1892 and was extended to Turnchapel on 1 January 1897.

=== After 1892 ===
The broad gauge was removed from the GWR after 20 May 1892 and the single track west of Devonport was doubled over the next few years. This heralded the expansion of services in the towns around Plymouth over the next dozen years, including a new branch to Yealmpton which opened on 17 January 1898, and a station at Keyham to serve the dockyards which opened on 1 July 1900.

In 1904 a number of new halts were opened that allowed a suburban service to be operated between Plympton and Saltash in response to competition from street tramways. The LSWR instigated a similar service between Friary and St Budeaux.

The LSWR became part of the new Southern Railway (SR) in 1923.

The first contraction of passenger services was seen when the GWR's Yealmpton branch was closed on 7 July 1930, although it was reopened in 1941 to allow Plymothians to reach the safety of the countryside during The Blitz. This period during the Second World War saw the closure of Millbay station to passengers following bombing and some of the smaller halts were closed, apparently as their wooden structures were considered a fire risk. A new connection between the GWR and SR was put in at St Budeaux to allow flexibility of routing in the event of bomb damage; other connections were installed at Lydford and Launceston.

Mutley station had closed on 2 March 1939 to allow reconstruction of the approaches to the adjacent North Road station. Because of the interruption by the war, work on the new North Road station was not completed for over twenty years. The new panel signal box at North Road was commissioned in 1960 and, since 1973, controls all movements in the Plymouth area.

The GWR and SR were nationalised into British Railways on 1 January 1948 but the lines around Plymouth remained parts of two different regions until 1963. The Yealmpton branch had closed again to passengers on 6 October 1947, followed by the Turnchapel branch on 10 September 1951, Friary station on 15 September 1958, Plympton on 3 March 1959, and the Tavistock line on 31 December 1962. The old LSWR line through Devonport was closed on 7 September 1964 with remaining trains to Gunnislake running over the CR route to St Budeaux where they used the wartime connection to rejoin the old PDSWJR route. The remaining suburban services to Saltash, which had been reduced after 1961 following the opening of the Tamar Bridge for the A38 road, were withdrawn in 1972.

== Current services ==
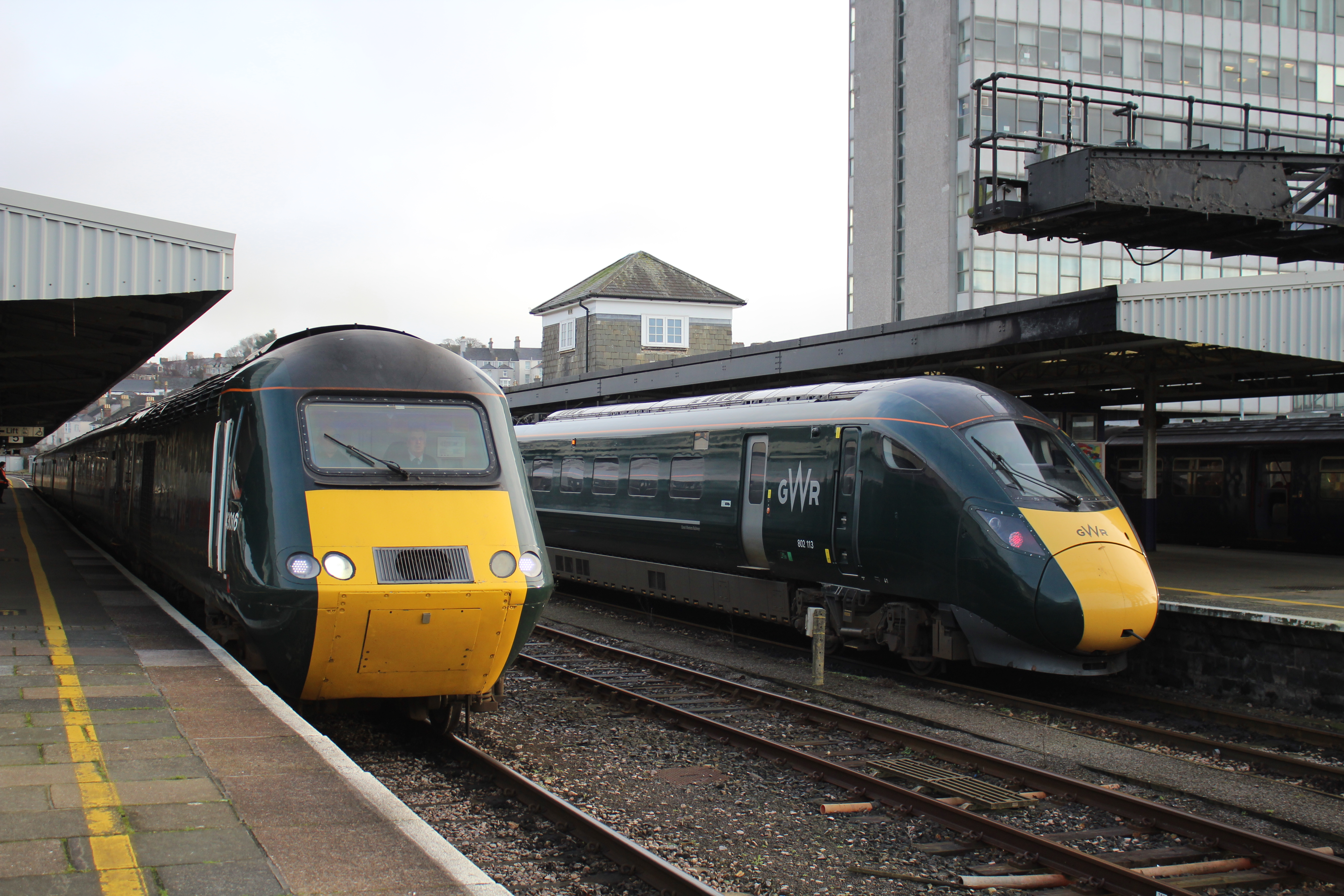
HSTs and Class 802s are the train types used most often on the main line through Plymouth

Plymouth railway station is an important station on the Exeter–Plymouth line. Great Western Railway (GWR) trains from London Paddington station either terminate here or continue to Penzance along the Cornish Main Line. Other services on this route are operated by CrossCountry from as far as Manchester or Aberdeen. Local services are operated by GWR, both on the main line and on the Tamar Valley Line to Gunnislake.

Typical journey times are: Ivybridge 15 minutes; Liskeard 24 min.; Gunnislake 45 min.; Exeter St Davids 55 min.; Truro 1 1/4 hours; Newquay 1 3/4 hr.; Penzance or Bristol Temple Meads 2 hr.; London Paddington or Birmingham New Street 3 1/2 hr.; Edinburgh Waverley 8 1/2 hr.

== List of stations ==
Opening and closing dates are for passenger services. Goods traffic, if handled, may have started and finished on different dates.

Estimated station usage based on sales of tickets in stated financial year(s) which end or originate at each station from Office of Rail and Road statistics. The methodology for calculating the number may vary between years. Closure dates refer to passenger services, goods traffic may have continued to a later date.

Station	Opened	Closed	Route	Usage 1999–2000	Usage 2018–19	Notes
Albert Road Halt	1906	1947	PDSWJR			
Billacombe	1898	1947	Yealmpton branch			
Camels Head Halt	1906	1942	PDSWJR			
Devonport	1859	-	Cornish Main Line, Tamar Valley Line	38,189	39,464	Known as Devonport Albert Road from 1949 until 1968.
Devonport Kings Road	1876	1964	LSWR, PDSWJR			
Dockyard	1905	-	Cornish Main Line, Tamar Valley Line	6,005	4,406	Known as Dockyard Halt until 1969.
Elburton Cross	1898	1947	Yealmpton branch			Closed 1930 but reopened 1941.
Ford (Devon)	1890	1964	PDSWJR			
Ford Halt	1904	1941	Cornish Main Line			
Keyham	1900	-	Cornish Main Line, Tamar Valley Line	8,421	7,516	
Laira	1848	1849	South Devon Main Line			Temporary South Devon Railway terminus at Laira Green.
Laira Halt	1904	1930	South Devon Main Line			
Lipson Vale Halt	1904	1941	South Devon Main Line, LSWR			
Lucas Terrace Halt	1905	1951	Turnchapel branch, Yealmpton branch			
Marsh Mills	1861	1962	Tavistock branch			Now the headquarters of the Plym Valley Railway.
Millbay Docks	1893	1963	Branch from Millbay station			Great Western Railway liner terminal.
Mount Gould and Tothill Halt	1905	1915	Yealmpton branch			
Mutley	1871	1939	South Devon Main Line, LSWR			
Ocean Quay	1904	1910	LSWR			LSWR liner terminal at Stonehouse Pool.
Oreston	1897	1951	Turnchapel branch			
Plymouth Friary	1891	1958	PDSWJR, Turnchapel branch			
Plymouth Millbay	1849	1941	South Devon Main Line, Cornish Main Line, Tavistock branch			Plymouth's principal station until the opening of North Road.
Plymouth North Road	1877	-	South Devon Main Line, Cornish Main Line, Tamar Valley Line; LSWR, Tavistock branch	1,294,698	2,416,376	Known as just Plymouth since 1958.
Plympton	1848	1959	South Devon Main Line			
Plymstock	1892	1951	Turnchapel branch, Yealmpton branch			
St Budeaux Ferry Road	1904	-	Cornish Main Line	1,357	3,092	
St Budeaux Victoria Road	1890	-	PDSWJR Tamar Valley Line	4,991	9,376	
Tamerton Foliot	1897	1962	PDSWJR			
Turnchapel	1897	1951	Turnchapel branch			
Weston Mill Halt	1906	1921	PDSWJR			
Wingfield Villas Halt	1904	1921	Cornish Main Line			

== Dock and harbour lines ==
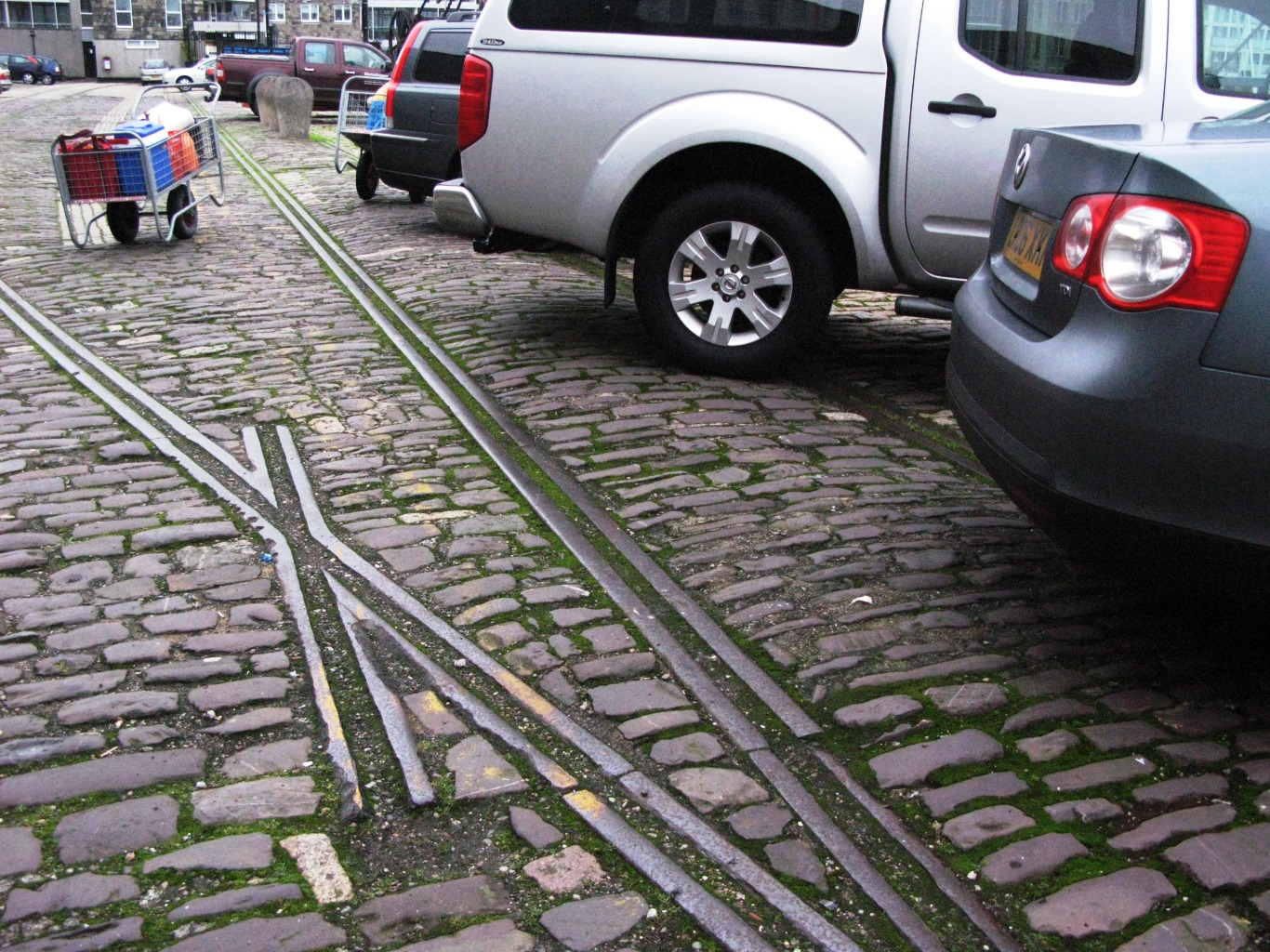
The remains of old mixed gauge track on Sutton Wharf

Quays on the Cattewater, on the River Plym on the east side of Plymouth, were first served by the P&DR. A standard gauge connection was later established by the LSWR and this is still open for goods traffic, trains having to reverse in a spur outside the old Friary station.

Sutton Harbour, the old harbour in the centre of the town, was also served by a P&DR line to Coxside, on the north-eastern side of the harbour. With the arrival of the SDR in 1848 this line was taken over by the new company but mixed gauge was retained until 1857 after which it became a broad gauge only line; a short branch to a yard at Sutton Harbour, a little to the west of Coxside, was opened at around the same time.

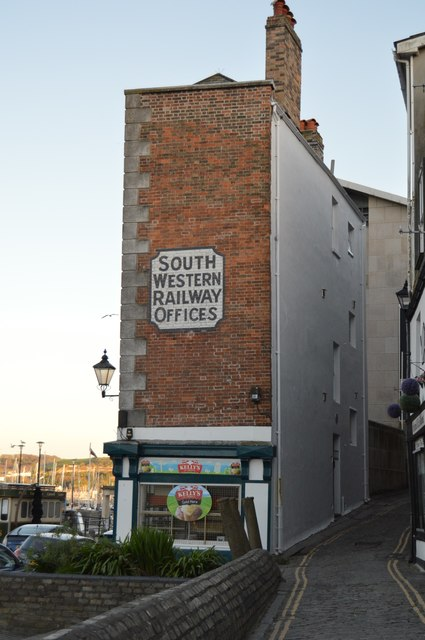
The surviving ghost sign on the LSWR goods office in the Barbican. There was no railway here, the nearest being on Vauxhall Quay.

The LSWR opened a route from Friary station to North Quay on 22 October 1879 and this was connected to the GWR's Sutton Harbour yard on 6 November 1879 and trains of both gauges could shunt the quays. These lines carried on beyond North Quay to Sutton Wharf and Vauxhall Quay; a short piece of this mixed gauge track still survives on this section.

The Plymouth Great Western Docks, like the broad gauge railways, were engineered by Isambard Kingdom Brunel and were connected to Millbay station in 1850. Over the years the network of lines were expanded around all sides of the dock. Ocean Special Mail trains were run direct from the docks to London Paddington; it was one of these in 1904 that saw City of Truro exceed 100 mph (160 km/h).

The LSWR established their own Ocean Terminal on the west side of Stonehouse Pool, reached by a short branch from their Devonport station. Fast passenger trains ran from here to London Waterloo in connection with trans-Atlantic liners.

The naval dockyards at Devonport were connected to the CR at Keyham in 1867. At first these were worked by the CR but the Dockyard built up an extensive locomotive fleet to operate the various yards, including the South Yard which was reached through a tunnel. A free passenger service was operated which had six different classes of accommodation.

== Engine sheds ==
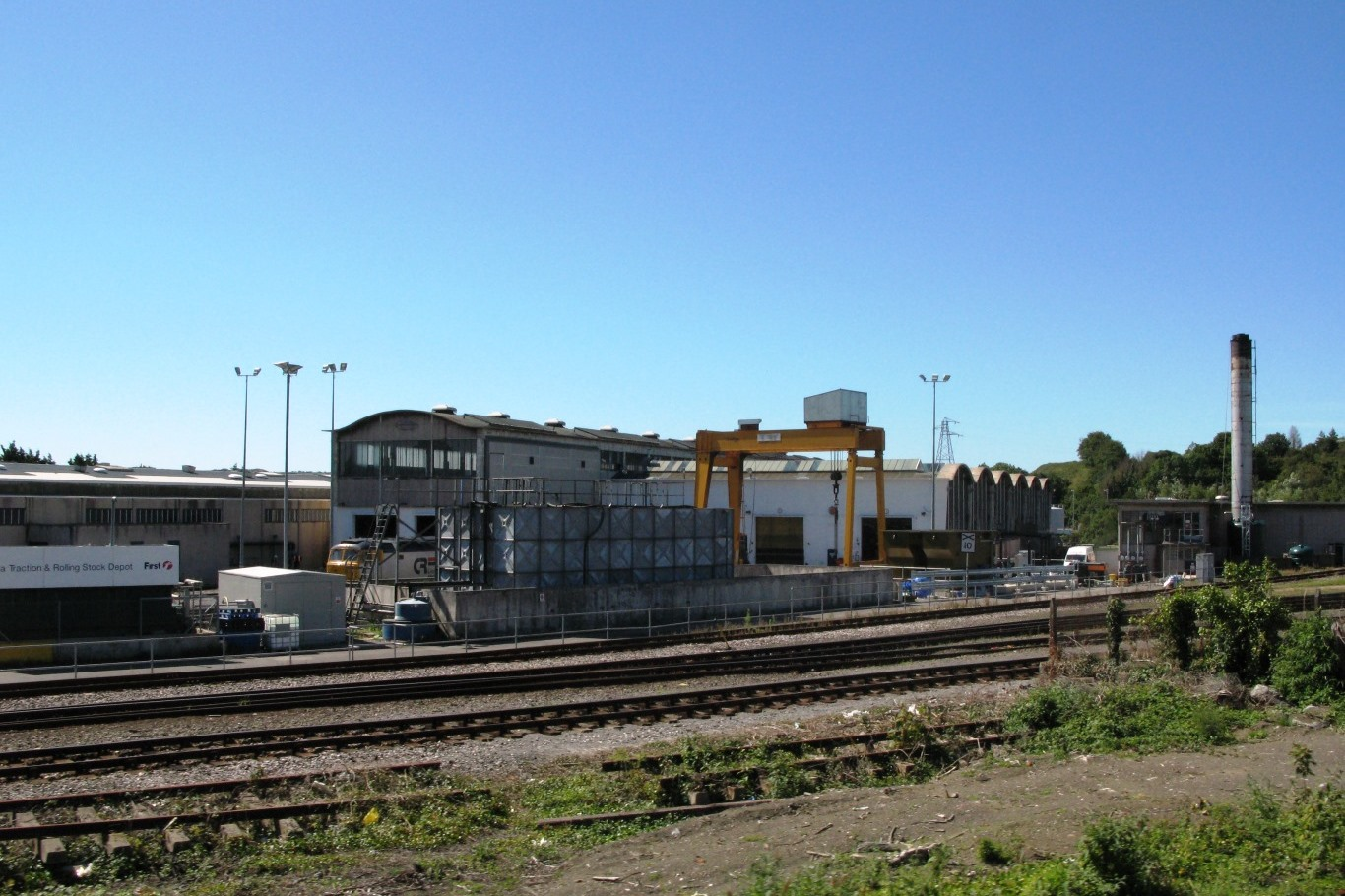
Laira TMD

The temporary SDR terminus at Laira had equally temporary locomotive accommodation which was relocated to Millbay when the line was extended to there in 1849. This was the main GWR engine shed at Plymouth until 23 July 1924, although the site was used to stable locomotives until 1931. A small shed was opened in the adjacent docks around 1869 and was used to house the small shunting locomotives used there until about 1955.

A new GWR shed was opened at Laira about 1901 and this was the main shed for the area following the closure of Millbay. It is still in use today, servicing Great Western Railway's High Speed Trains and Class 150 DMUs and CrossCountry Class 220s and Class 221s.

The LSWR opened its main shed at Friary in 1890 but this was replaced by a new larger shed (close to the later site of Lucas Terrace Halt) in 1908. It was closed in 1963 and its remaining locomotives transferred to Laira. The LSWR also had a smaller shed at Devonport; initially the only shed in the area, it was kept on to provide engines for the Stonehouse Pool line.

== Engineering ==
=== Tunnels ===
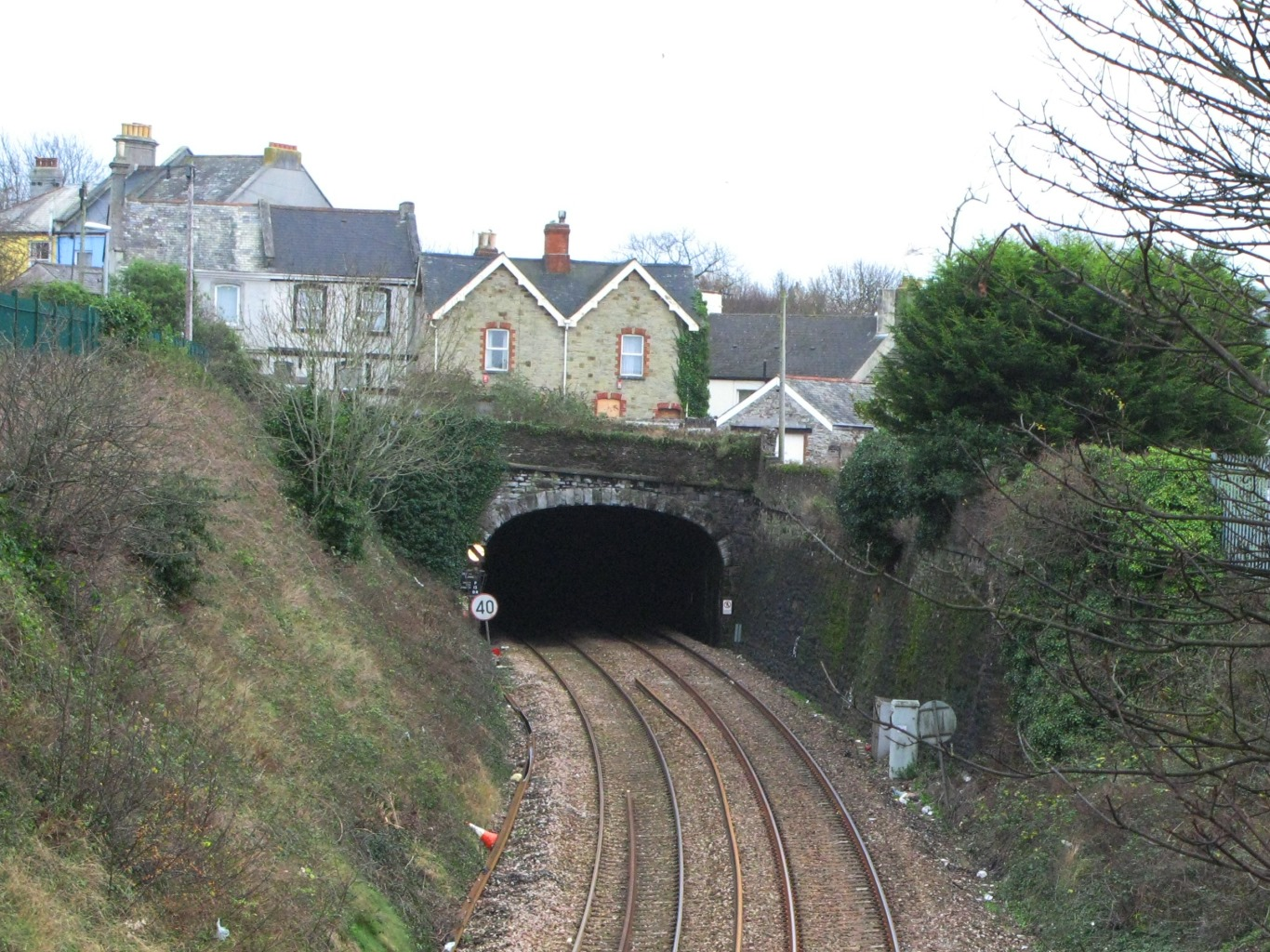
Devonport Tunnel

The South Devon line passes through Mutley Tunnel (beneath Mutley Plain) on its approach to North Road station. This tunnel now appears much longer than it really is due to the cutting on the west side being covered by a concrete raft supporting a car park.

The Cornwall line passes through the short Devonport Tunnel just west of Devonport station. The PDSWJ route had two tunnels at a lower level, Devonport Park Tunnel and Ford Tunnel, between which was a short deep cutting which was the location of Albert Road Halt.

There were also a number of tunnels on the freight lines. The P&DR had a tunnel at Leigham; the Devonport Dockyard lines ran through a tunnel to reach South Yard; and the LSWR's North Quay branch had a tunnel beneath Exeter Street.

=== Bridges and viaducts ===
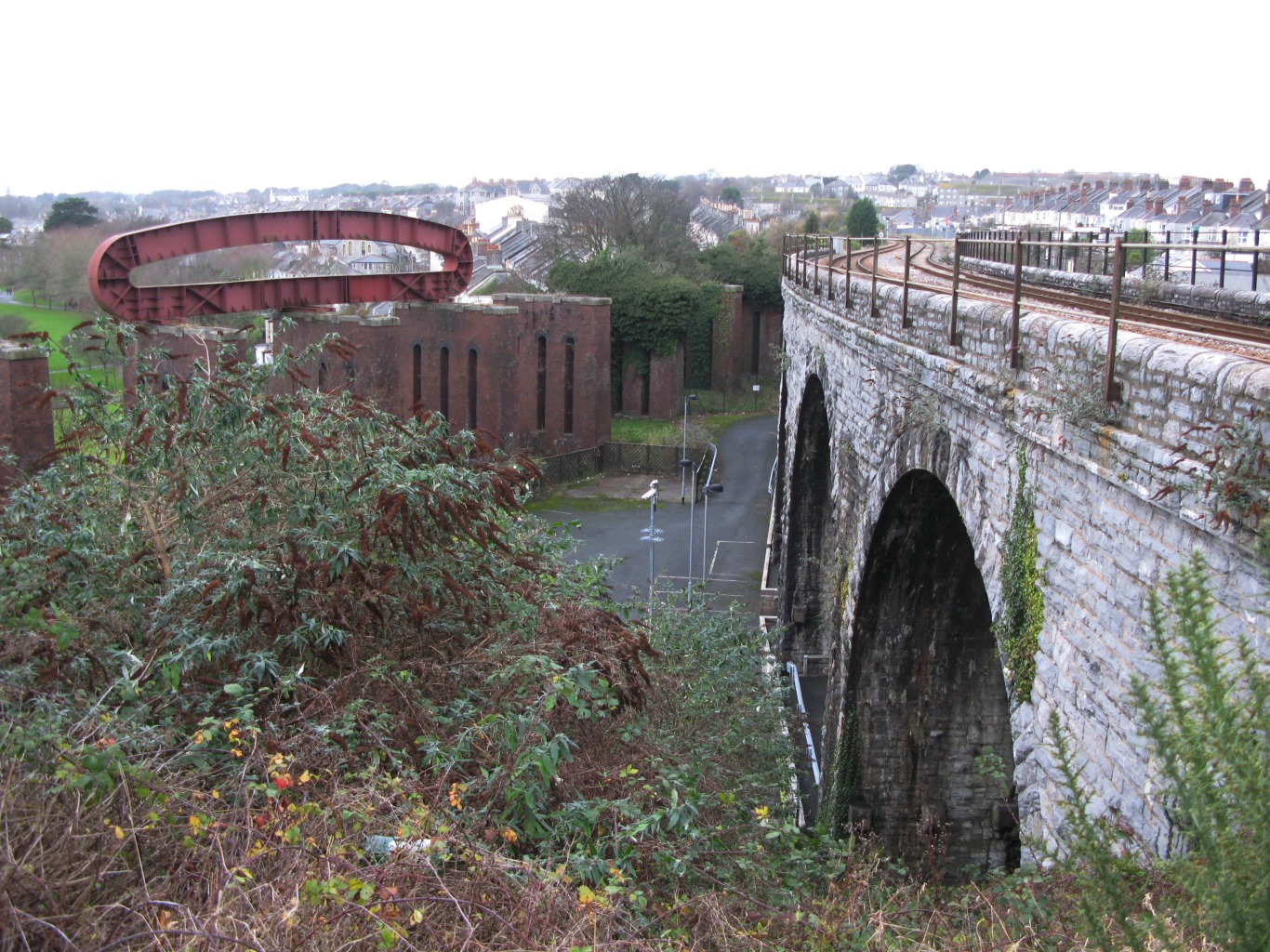
Pennycomequick Viaduct (right) and the remains of Stonehouse Pool Viaduct

Millbay station was built in an elevated position with a short viaduct and bridge across Union Street immediately beyond the platform end. The arches of this viaduct were rented out to local traders for storage and were even used as a garage for the buses used on the GWR road motor services.

The CR line passed over three of the many Cornwall Railway viaducts. These were originally built from timber but were all rebuilt in more durable materials between 1899 and 1908. The first was the 321 feet (98 m) long Stonehouse Pool viaduct which was rebuilt in brick with iron girders in 1908 and, since it no longer carries trains, its girders have been replaced an abstract artwork that is said to represent the railway as it passes along the Sea Wall. The next two structures were either side of Keyham station. Keyham viaduct (432 ft) was rebuilt in brick with girders in 1899 and later with steel girders in 1937. The longer Weston Mill viaduct (1,200 ft) crosses Camel's Head creek was replaced in 1903 with short brick viaducts either side of a four-span bowstring girder structure. The railway then crosses 100 feet (30 m) above the River Tamar on the 2,187½ feet-long Royal Albert Bridge.

Pennycomequick Viaduct was brought into use on 18 May 1876 with the new Cornwall Loop line. This was built from limestone and joined the western end of Stonehouse Pool Viaduct.

== See also ==
- Exeter to Plymouth railway of the LSWR
