= Plymouth Friary railway station =

Former railway station in Devon, England

Plymouth Friary
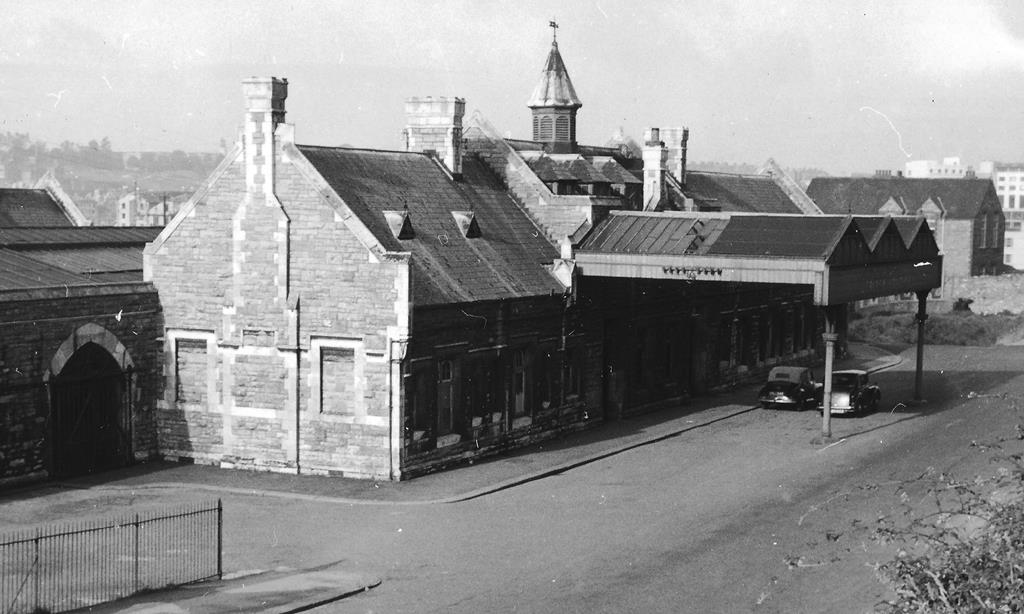

General information
- Location: Plymouth, Devon, England
- Coordinates: 50.3723°N 4.1302°W
- Grid reference: SX485546

Other information
- Status: Disused

History
- Original company: London and South Western Railway
- Pre-grouping: Great Western Railway
- Post-grouping: Great Western Railway

Key dates
- 17 May 1876: Opened
- 1958: Closed to passengers
- 1963: Closed to goods traffic
Location

Plymouth Friary railway station was the London and South Western Railway's terminus in the city of Plymouth, in Devon, England, between 1876 and 1958.

== History ==
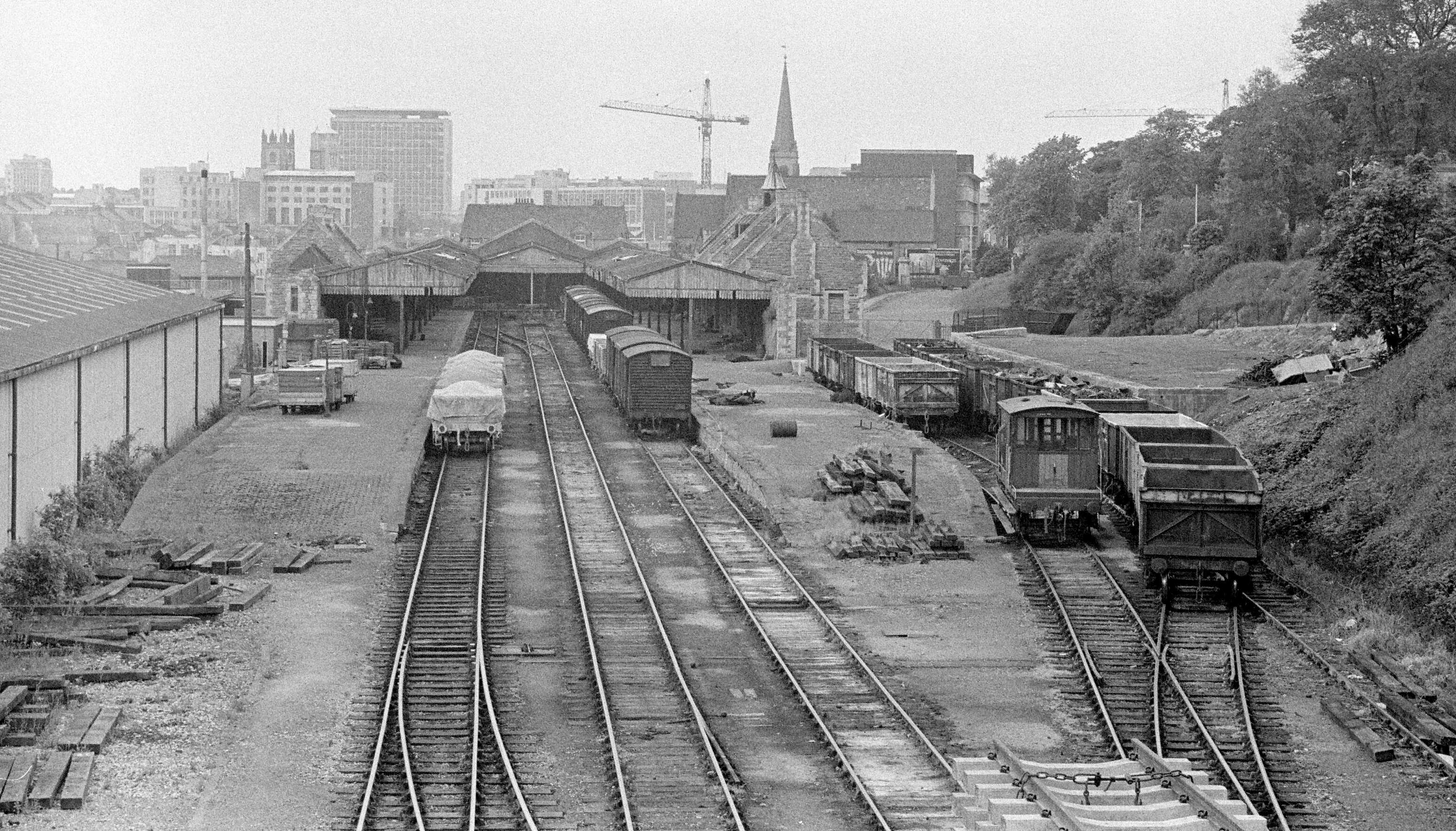
Plymouth Friary station in use as a freight depot (17 May 1975)

London and South Western Railway (LSWR) trains first arrived at Plymouth on 17 May 1876, entering the town from the east. To get there, trains had travelled over the company's line as far as Lydford, then over the Great Western Railway's (GWR) Launceston branch, via Tavistock South and the South Devon main line, to Mutley.

Trains then continued over the new Cornwall Loop Viaduct (now known as Pennycomequick Viaduct) and a short section of the Cornwall Railway before reaching the company's line to Devonport Kings Road. A new joint LSWR and GWR station at Plymouth North Road, a short distance to the west of Mutley, was opened on 28 March 1877.

Friary goods station had opened on 1 February 1878, at the end of a short branch from Friary Junction near Laira on the GWR's Sutton Harbour branch. On 22 October 1879, an extension was opened through a short tunnel beneath Exeter Street to North Quay on Sutton Harbour, from where wagon turntables allowed access to Sutton Wharf and Vauxhall Quay. A reversal at Friary allowed access to another branch to Cattedown, although this was not completed until 1888.

The LSWR established a route to Plymouth independent of the GWR on 1 June 1890, when the Plymouth, Devonport and South Western Junction Railway (PDSWJ) was opened from Lydford to Devonport. For a short while, LSWR trains terminated at North Road but, on 1 July 1891, a new passenger terminus station was opened at Friary. The station was close to the eastern side of the town centre, facing onto Beaumont Road, but also with an entrance from Exeter Street. There were four platform lines serving two platforms. A 300 feet (91 m) by 100 feet (30 m) goods shed was situated to the south of the station, the side nearest Exeter Street.

On 5 September 1892, a line was opened across the River Plym to Plymstock; it was extended to Turnchapel on 1 January 1897. The GWR also served Plymstock from a direct line from Plymouth Millbay, via Laira, en route to Yealmpton; however, from 3 November 1941 until 7 October 1947, GWR trains ran from Friary to Yealmpton.

Passenger services were withdrawn on 15 September 1958, after which it became the city's main goods depot, allowing the space at Millbay to be used for carriage storage. General goods traffic ceased from 5 May 1963, but a freight concentration depot was built in 1966. The main station building was demolished in 1976 and the remaining freight traffic was eventually moved out to Tavistock Junction.

== Harbourside lines ==
On 22 October 1879 an extension was opened through a short tunnel beneath Exeter Street to North Quay on Sutton Harbour, from where wagon turntables allowed access to Sutton Wharf and Vauxhall Quay; an LSWR office was established on the Barbican opposite the Fish Quay. A connection from the GWR Sutton Harbour depot to North Quay was opened on 6 November 1879 and both companies then served the quays.

A longer branch to Cattedown was started soon after the Friary goods branch had opened in 1878; it was completed in 1888. It served the Corporation Wharves just south of the Laira Bridge across the River Plym, which had been served by the Plymouth and Dartmoor Railway (P&DR) for many years. It then continued to follow the water from along Cattewater to terminate at the Victoria Wharves, a short distance south of the GWR's Coxside depot on Sutton Harbour. Along the way, it served a number of sidings: the electricity power station at Princes Rock; a Plymouth Corporation depot, Blight and White, Regent Oil and the wharves at Cattedown; the railway's own goods depot at Cattewater; South West Tar Distillers; and Esso in Cattedown Quarry. There is a 48 yards (44 m) tunnel at Cattedown.

== Motive power depot ==
A two-road engine shed was provided at Friary from 1890, to replace the shed at Devonport Kings Road for terminating locomotives, although Devonport was retained to house the locomotive used on the Stonehouse Pool branch. The Friary shed was situated to the south of the station.

The shed was replaced in 1908 by a larger building east of the station, near Lucas Terrace Halt, which now had three roads.

The shed's allocation covered all the duties on the local branch lines, as well as some services to Exeter Queen Street. For example, it was allocated 27 locomotives in 1933; there were nine T9 4-4-0s for main line trains, 12 O2 and T1 0-4-4Ts for local services, two ex-PDSWJ 0-6-2Ts and four small B4 0-4-0Ts for goods trains.

On 1 February 1958, responsibility for Friary shed passed to the Western Region of British Railways, but remained in use until May 1963.

== Signalling ==
The signal box that controlled Friary goods and the junctions with the harbour branches was replaced on 1 July 1891 with two new boxes. Friary A was a 55-lever box at the junction of the passenger and goods lines on the approach to the station; a new 43-lever frame was installed in 1909. The box closed on 24 April 1966, when control of trains at Friary became the responsibility of staff on the ground, with the approaches controlled by the panel signal box at North Road.

Friary B signal box housed 45 levers and controlled movements within the passenger station. It closed on 21 July 1962.

== The site today ==
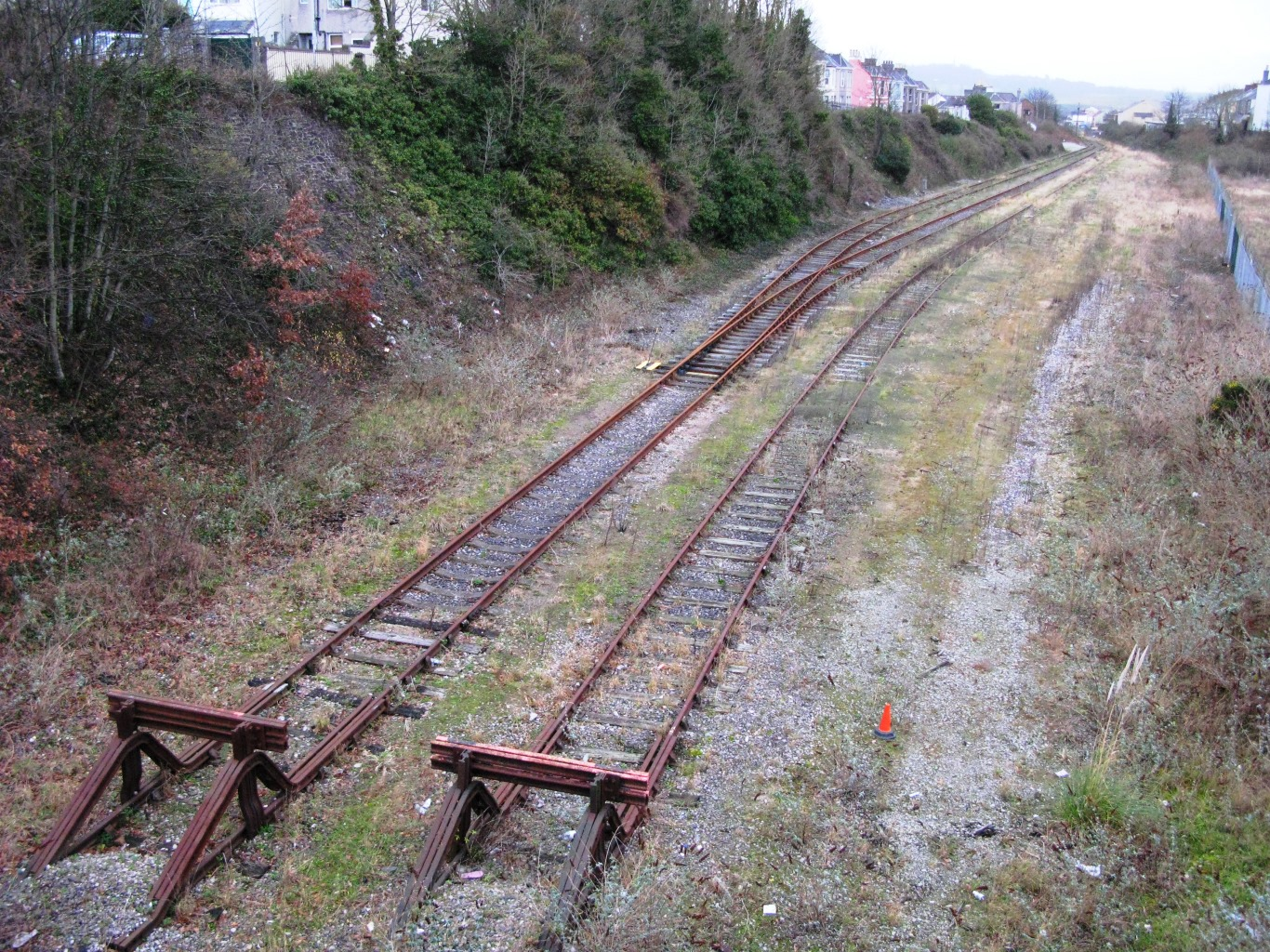
The only tracks remaining in 2007

The station site has been covered in houses and large retail units; a track still comes as far as Tothill Road, where a loop and siding is still in use to allow trains to reverse on their way to Cattedown. The station master's house, on the corner of Beaumont Road and Tothill Road, is now a doctors' surgery.

== Routes ==
| Preceding station | Disused railways | Following station |
|---|---|---|
| Lipson Vale Halt | London and South Western Railway – West of England Main Line | Terminus |
| Lucas Terrace Halt | London and South Western Railway – Turnchapel branch | Terminus |
| Lucas Terrace Halt | Great Western Railway – Yealmpton branch | Terminus |

== See also ==
- Railways in Plymouth
