= Elburton Cross railway station =

Disused railway station in Plymstock, Devon

Elburton Cross
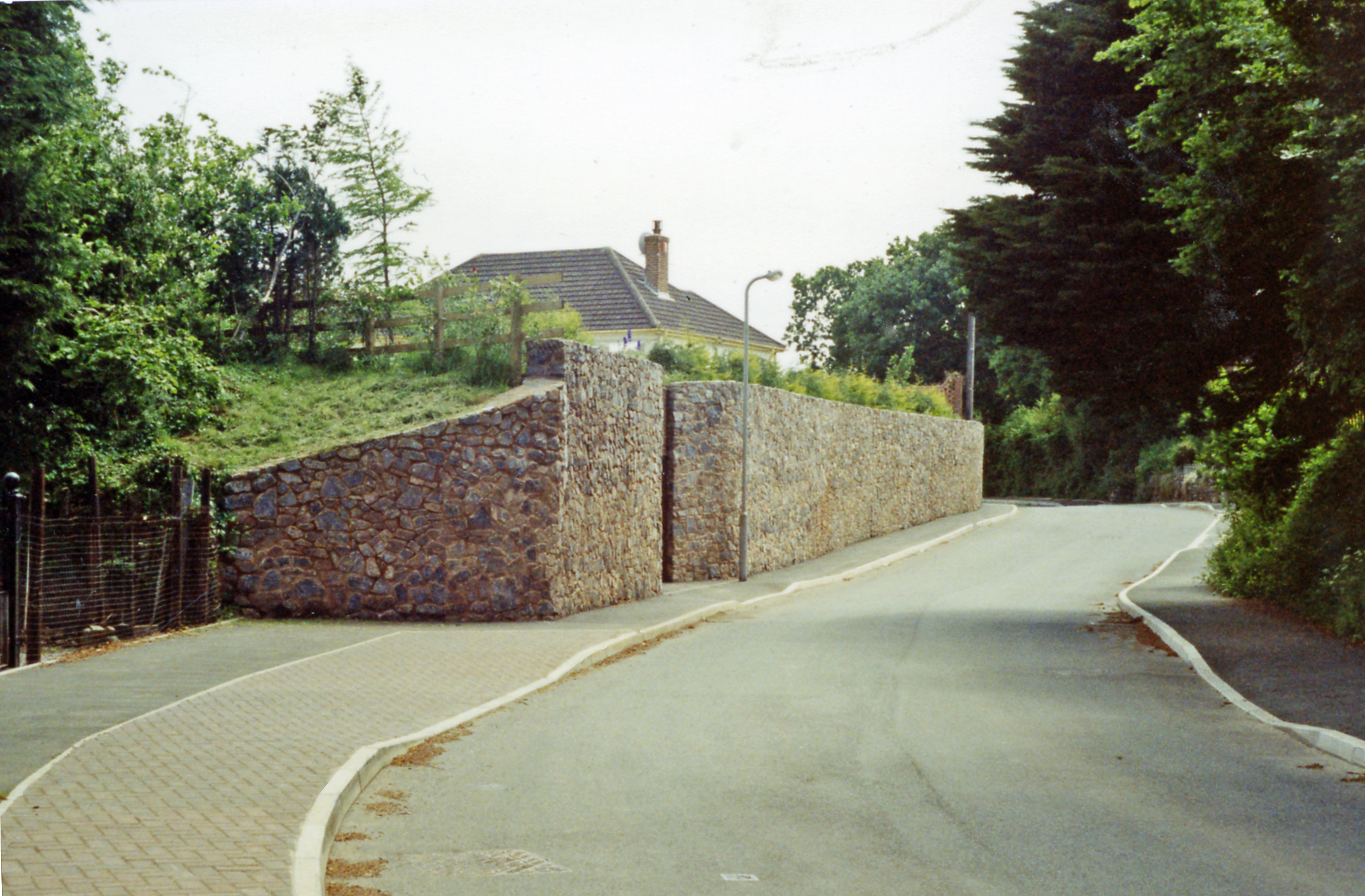
- The site of the station, looking north, in 1991

General information
- Location: Plymstock, Devon; England
- Coordinates: 50.3611°N 4.0605°W
- Grid reference: SX534532
- Platforms: 1

Other information
- Status: Disused

History
- Original company: Great Western Railway

Key dates
- 17 January 1898: Opened
- 7 July 1930: Closed
- 3 November 1941: Reopened
- 6 October 1947: Closed to passengers
- 29 July 1960: Closed completely
Location

Elburton Cross railway station served the suburb of Plymstock, Devon, England from 1898 to 1960 on the Plymouth to Yealmpton Branch. It was situated 1 mile 77 chains (3 km) from Plymstock station and 5 miles 68 chains (9 km) of Plymouth Millbay station.

== History ==
The station opened on 17 January 1898 by the Great Western Railway. The ticket sales were initially high for the time, with 11,355 tickets selling in 1903. The sales were higher in 1913, with 20,831 tickets selling. It steadily began to decline due to competition with the roads. Only 5,818 tickets and 32 season tickets were sold in 1929. The station closed to passengers in July 1930. It reopened on 3 November 1941 for those who were forced to leave their homes due to the World War II blitz. It was shown as Elburton in the 1942 edition of the handbook of stations. It closed again to passengers on 6 October 1947 and to goods traffic on 29 July 1960.

Preceding station	Disused railways	Following station
Billacombe; Line and station closed	Great Western Railway; Plymouth to Yealmpton Branch	Brixton Road; Line and station closed
