= Laira =

Suburb of Plymouth, Devon

Coordinates: 50.38°N 4.10°W

- Location within Devon
- Unitary authority: Plymouth
- Ceremonial county: Devon
- Region: South West
- Country: England
- Sovereign state: United Kingdom
- Post town: PLYMOUTH
- Postcode district: PL3 6xx
- Dialling code: 01752
- Police: Devon and Cornwall
- Fire: Devon and Somerset
- Ambulance: South Western

Laira /ˈlɛərə/ – previously recorded as Lare (1591), Lary poynte (1638), the Leerie (1643), and the Lairy (1802) – was originally the name given to that part of the estuary of the River Plym from the Cattewater up to Marsh Mills in Plymouth, Devon, England. The name may derive from a Brythonic word corresponding to the Welsh llaeru, meaning 'to ebb'.

The A379 road and the disused Plymouth to Yealmpton railway line cross the estuary just above the Plymouth suburb of Cattedown by two bridges both known as Laira Bridge.

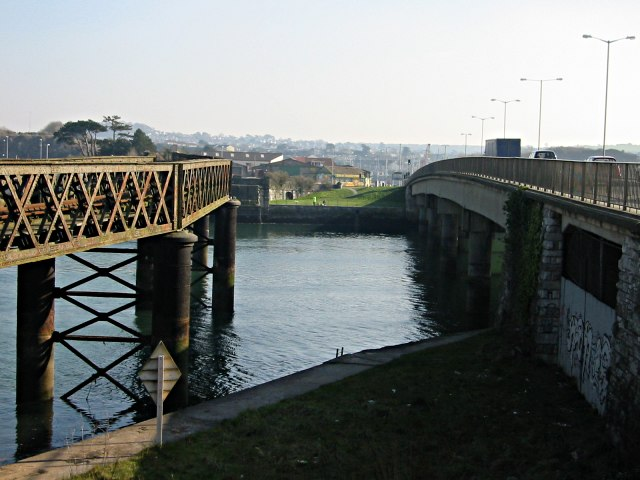
The disused railway and more recent road crossings of the Laira at Cattedown

The name Laira now also refers to the area of Plymouth surrounding the Laira Traction Maintenance Depot. Much of the housing here was built around 1900 for employees of the depot. There is a memorial plaque to the men of Laira who died in the Great War along Old Laira Road. Also situated on Old Laira Road is the old Police / Fire Station which is currently used as a library. Laira Green Primary school is situated in the area, as well as a disused United Reformed Church.

Lairy Embankment (Plymouth) Act 1802
- Act of Parliament
- Parliament of the United Kingdom
- Long title: An act to enable his Majesty to grant certain Parcels of Land, situate between Great Prince Rock and the Village of Crab Tree, called Tothill Bay, and Lipson Bay, near to the Borough of Plymouth in the County of Devon, to certain Persons therein named, for the Purpose of embanking and preferring the same from the Sea.
- Citation: 42 Geo. 3. c. 32
- Territorial extent: United Kingdom

Dates
- Royal assent: 24 March 1802
- Commencement: 24 March 1802 (Note: The Acts of Parliament (Commencement) Act 1793.)
- Repealed: 25 July 1898
Other legislation
Repealed by	Plymouth Corporation Act 1898

Status: Repealed

Text of statute as originally enacted

Until the beginning of the 19th century, Old Laira Road had constituted the northern shore of Lipson Lake (or Bay), an extensive tidal inlet on the western side of the estuary. This area – on which the railway depot and Lipson Co-operative Academy now stand – was reclaimed from the estuary and drained, together with Tothill Bay on the south side of higher ground at Mount Gould, upon the completion in 1802 of an embankment along the whole western shore of the Laira. A new road, laid along this embankment shortly afterwards, from Laira Green to Prince Rock, soon became the main highway into Plymouth from Plympton, Exeter, and beyond, avoiding the often steep and narrow way via Old Laira Road and Lipson – even though the new route was to remain a toll road until 1924.
