= Brixton Road railway station =

Disused railway station in Brixton Road, Devon

Brixton Road
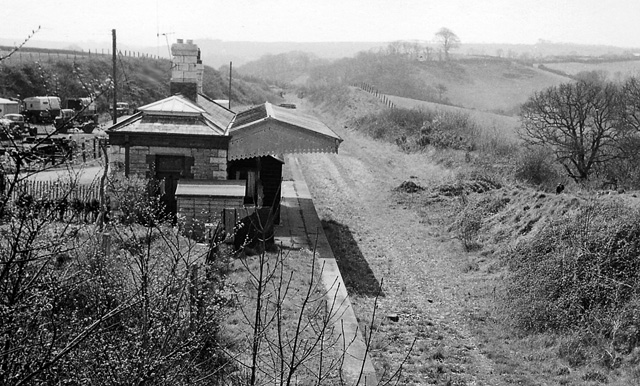
- The site of the station in 1964

General information
- Location: Brixton, Devon; England
- Coordinates: 50.3534°N 4.0522°W
- Grid reference: SX541524
- Platforms: 1

Other information
- Status: Disused

History
- Original company: Great Western Railway
- Pre-grouping: Great Western Railway

Key dates
- 17 January 1898: Opened
- 7 July 1930: Passenger service withdrawn
- 3 November 1941: Passenger service restored
- 6 October 1947: Closed to passengers
- 29 February 1960: Closed to goods
Location

Brixton Road railway station served the village of Brixton, Devon, England from 1898 to 1960 on the Plymouth to Yealmpton Branch.

== History ==
The station opened on 17 January 1898 by the Great Western Railway. A signal box and goods shed, along with its sidings, were installed in May 1905. Due to it being outdone by road competition, the station closed on 7 July 1930 but remained open to goods traffic. It reopened on 3 November 1941 but the passenger services were diverted to Plymouth Friary instead of Plymouth because the goods yard had been damaged by bombs in the Second World War so it had been temporarily closed. The station closed to passengers again on 6 October 1947 and to goods traffic on 29 February 1960.

Preceding station	Disused railways	Following station
Steer Point; Line and station closed	Great Western Railway; Plymouth to Yealmpton Branch	Elburton Cross; Line and station closed
