= Steer Point railway station =

Disused railway station in Brixton, Devon

Steer Point

General information
- Location: Brixton, Devon; England
- Coordinates: 50.3374°N 4.0403°W
- Grid reference: SX549506
- Platforms: 1

Other information
- Status: Disused

History
- Original company: Great Western Railway
- Pre-grouping: Great Western Railway

Key dates
- 17 January 1898: Opened
- 7 July 1930: Closed to passengers
- 3 November 1941: Reopened
- 6 October 1947: Closed to passengers again
- 29 February 1960: Closed to goods
Location

Steer Point railway station served the village of Brixton, Devon, England, from 1898 to 1960 on the Plymouth to Yealmpton Branch.

== History ==
The station opened on 17 January 1898 by the Great Western Railway. It was closed on 7 July 1930 but reopened on 3 November 1941 so the nearby residents could escape the blitz. Like the other stations on the branch, services were diverted to Plymouth Friary after the original Plymouth station was damaged by bombing during the Second World War. The station closed to passengers again on 6 October 1947 and to goods traffic on 29 February 1960.

Preceding station	Disused railways	Following station
Brixton Road; Line and station closed	Plymouth to Yealmpton Branch	Yealmpton; Line and station closed
