= Laira Bridge =

Bridge in Plymouth, England

Coordinates: 50.36909°N 4.10845°W

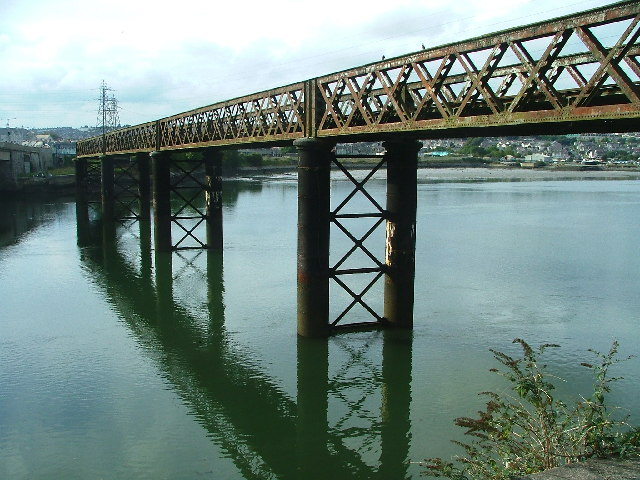
Laira Bridge prior to refurbishment

Laira Bridge is a disused railway bridge that crosses the River Plym in the city of Plymouth, Devon, England. In 2015, it was refurbished to carry a pedestrian and cycle path.

The name is also used to refer to the road bridge that runs alongside and carries the A379 road.

== History ==
The bridge was built adjacent to an earlier cast-iron road bridge, which had opened in 1827. The road bridge was removed and rebuild further south in 1962.

The bridge carried the London and South Western Railway branch to Turnchapel over the River Plym in Devon. Later the Great Western Railway also had running powers over the bridge, providing access to their Yealmpton branch at Plymstock. The bridge was built by Messrs Relf and Pethick after being authorised by an act of U.K. Parliament in 1883. It was completed by 1887, and was opened in July 1892.

Passenger trains ceased to use it when the passenger services to Turnchapel and Yealmpton were terminated in the 1950s, but the bridge remained in use to serve the Associated Portland Cement works. It finally closed to traffic in the 1990s.

== Refurbishment ==
In 2015, the bridge was restored at a cost of £3.5 million in order to turn it into a cycle and pedestrian pathway. The bridge reopened in May 2015, linking into existing footpaths and cycleways which join Devonport and Stonehouse in the west to Plymstock and Plympton in the east, including Route 27 of the National Cycle Network. Funding came from a number of sources including a £750,000 developer contribution from the Saltram Meadow development and from the government's local sustainable transport fund.
