= Billacombe railway station =

Disused railway station in Billacombe, Devon

Billacombe
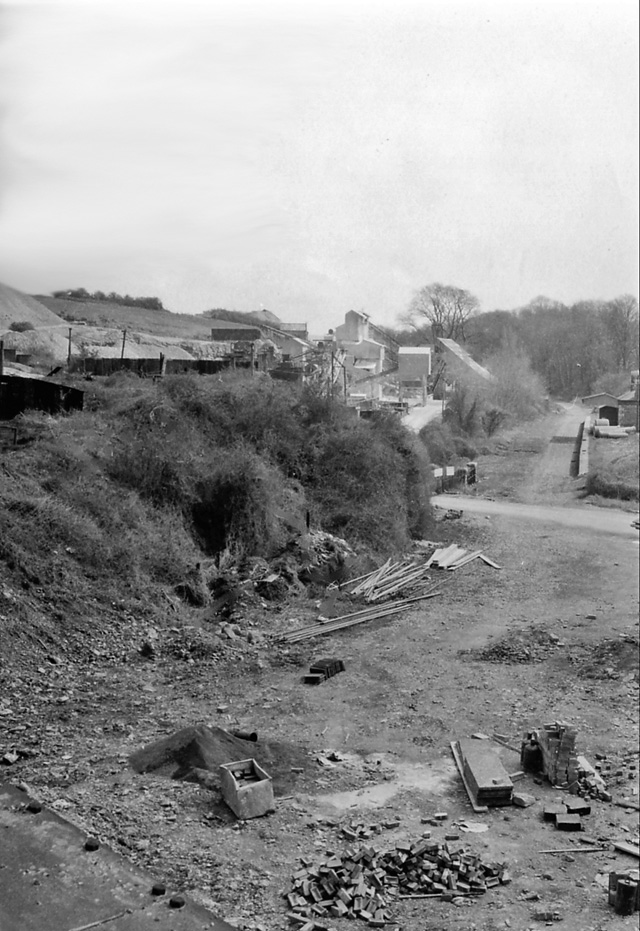
- The site of the station in 1964

General information
- Location: Billacombe, Devon; England
- Coordinates: 50.3655°N 4.0809°W
- Grid reference: SX521538
- Platforms: 1

Other information
- Status: Disused

History
- Original company: Great Western Railway
- Pre-grouping: Great Western Railway
- Post-grouping: Great Western Railway

Key dates
- 17 January 1898: Opened
- 7 July 1930: Closed
- 3 November 1941: Reopened
- 6 October 1947: Closed to passengers
- 29 February 1960: Closed completely
Location

Billacombe railway station served the village of Billacombe, Devon, England from 1898 on 1960 on the Plymouth to Yealmpton Branch.

== History ==
The station opened on 17 January 1898 by the Great Western Railway. The station closed to passengers on 7 July 1930. Like the other stations on the branch, it reopened for those who were forced to leave their homes due to the World War II blitz, except this station reopened on 3 November 1941. It closed again to passengers on 6 October 1947 and to goods traffic on 29 February 1960.

Preceding station	Disused railways	Following station
Plymstock; Line and station closed	Great Western Railway; Plymouth to Yealmpton Branch	Elburton Cross; Line and station closed
