= Oreston railway station =

Disused railway station in Oreston, Plymouth

Oreston

General information
- Location: Oreston, Plymouth; England
- Coordinates: 50.3614°N 4.1037°W
- Platforms: 1

Other information
- Status: Disused

History
- Original company: London and South Western Railway
- Pre-grouping: London and South Western Railway
- Post-grouping: Southern Railway; British Railways (Southern Region)

Key dates
- 1 January 1897: Opened
- 15 January 1951: Temporary closed
- 2 July 1951: Reopened
- 10 September 1951: Closed to passengers
- 30 September 1961: Closed to goods
Location

Oreston railway station served the suburb of Oreston, Plymouth, England from 1897 to 1961 on the Turnchapel Branch.

== History ==
The station opened on 1 January 1897 by the London and South Western Railway. It had a siding behind the station that served Messrs F J Moore Ltd., which supplied water. It temporarily closed on 15 January 1951 due to a fuel crisis but reopened on 2 July 1951, only to closed again to passengers on 10 September 1951 and closed to goods traffic on 30 September 1961.

Preceding station	Disused railways	Following station
Plymstock; Line and station closed	Turnchapel Branch	Turnchapel; Line and station closed
