= Lucas Terrace Halt railway station =

Disused railway station in Lucas Terrace, Plymouth

Lucas Terrace Halt

General information
- Location: Lucas Terrace, Plymouth; England
- Coordinates: 50.3738°N 4.115°W
- Grid reference: SX497548
- Platforms: 1

Other information
- Status: Disused

History
- Original company: London and South Western Railway
- Pre-grouping: London and South Western Railway
- Post-grouping: Southern Railway; British Railways (Southern Region)

Key dates
- October 1905: Opened
- 15 January 1951: Closed
- 2 July 1951: Reopened
- 10 September 1951: Closed permanently
Location

Lucas Terrace railway station, also known as Lucas Terrace Halt railway station, served the area of Lucas Terrace, Plymouth, England from 1905 to 1951 on the Plymouth to Yealmpton Branch.

== History ==
The station opened in October 1905 by the London and South Western Railway. Like the other stations on the line, trains were diverted to Plymouth Friary due to damage on the original Plymouth station in the Second World War. The station closed on 15 January 1951 but reopened on 2 July 1951, only to close again later the same year on 10 September.

Preceding station	Disused railways	Following station
Plymstock; Line and station closed	Plymouth to Yealmpton Branch	Plymouth Friary; Line and station closed
