= Turnchapel railway station =

Disused railway station in Turnchapel, Plymouth

Turnchapel

General information
- Location: Turnchapel, Plymouth; England
- Coordinates: 50.3574°N 4.1138°W
- Grid reference: SX503532
- Platforms: 1

Other information
- Status: Disused

History
- Original company: London and South Western Railway
- Pre-grouping: London and South Western Railway
- Post-grouping: Southern Railway; British Railways (Southern Region)

Key dates
- 1 January 1897: Opened
- 27 November 1940: Temporary closed due to fire
- 16 December 1940: Reopened
- 15 January 1951: Temporary closed again
- 2 July 1951: Reopened again
- 10 September 1951: Closed to passengers
- 1961: Closed to goods
Location

Turnchapel railway station served the suburb of Turnchapel, Plymouth, England from 1897 to 1961 on the Turnchapel Branch.

== History ==
The station opened on 1 January 1897 by the London and South Western Railway. It was set on fire by enemies in the Second World War on 27 November 1940 when the nearby oil depot was set on fire, destroying the station and the signal box. Three firemen were killed trying to cool down the oil so no explosions would occur. The fire was put out on 1 December and the station reopened on 16 December. Temporary structures were put up in place of the original buildings. The station and branch closed on 15 January 1951 due to a fuel crisis. It reopened on 2 July 1951, only to closed again to passengers on 10 September of the same year. It closed to goods traffic in 1961.

Preceding station	Disused railways	Following station
Oreston; Line and station closed	Turnchapel Branch	Terminus
