= Millbay =

Area of dockland in Plymouth, England

Coordinates: 50.368°N 4.148°W

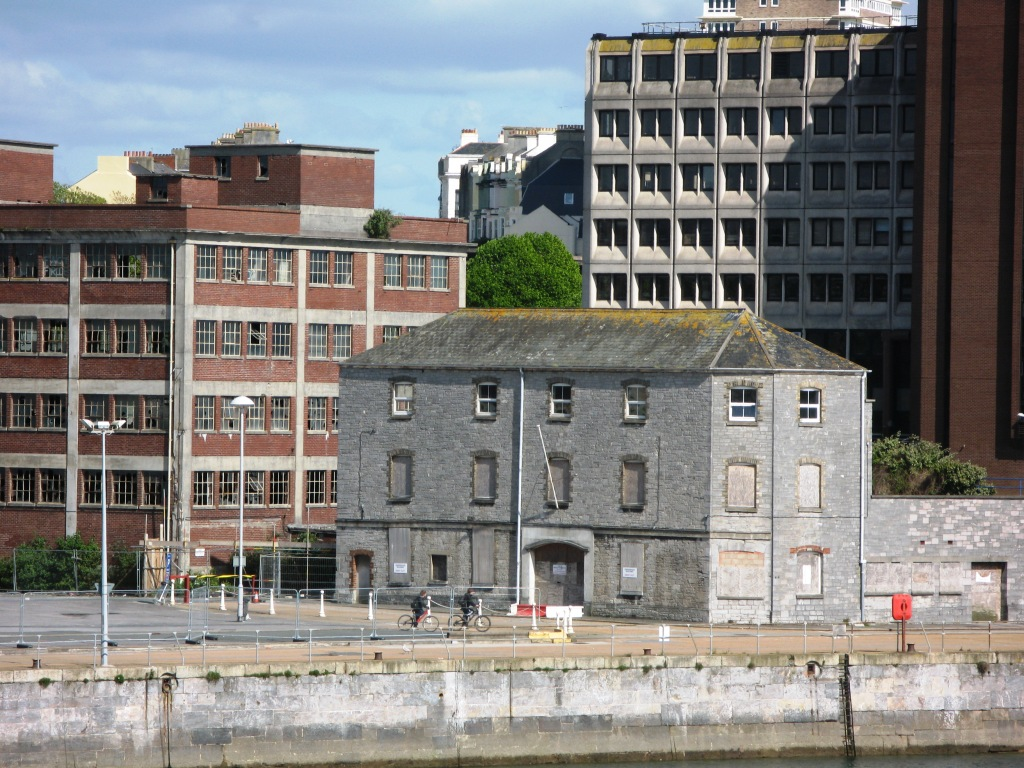
An old warehouse at Millbay Docks in Plymouth survives surrounded by more modern buildings

Millbay, also known as Millbay Docks, is an area of dockland in Plymouth, Devon, England. It lies south of Union Street, between West Hoe in the east and Stonehouse in the west. The area is currently subject to a public-private regeneration creating new homes, business premises, marina, a 1000-pupil school and opening up the waterfront to greater public access.

== Early history ==
Mill Bay was a natural inlet to the west of the Hoe. It was originally far more extensive than the current docks because it included the "Sourepool" which was a tidal salt-marsh that lay roughly along the line of today's Union Street. The Sourepool was separated from the bay by a narrow neck across which tidal mills were built, probably in the 12th century. These mills were operated by the Priors of Plympton who collected the income from grinding corn. By the mid 15th century, the mills were owned and let by the Corporation of Plymouth; the lease was sold to Francis Drake in 1573. In 1591–92 Drake built six new mills along Drake's Leat that had recently been completed. Around this time the old tidal mills closed and the Sourepool was drained ("made drie for a meadow") in 1592.

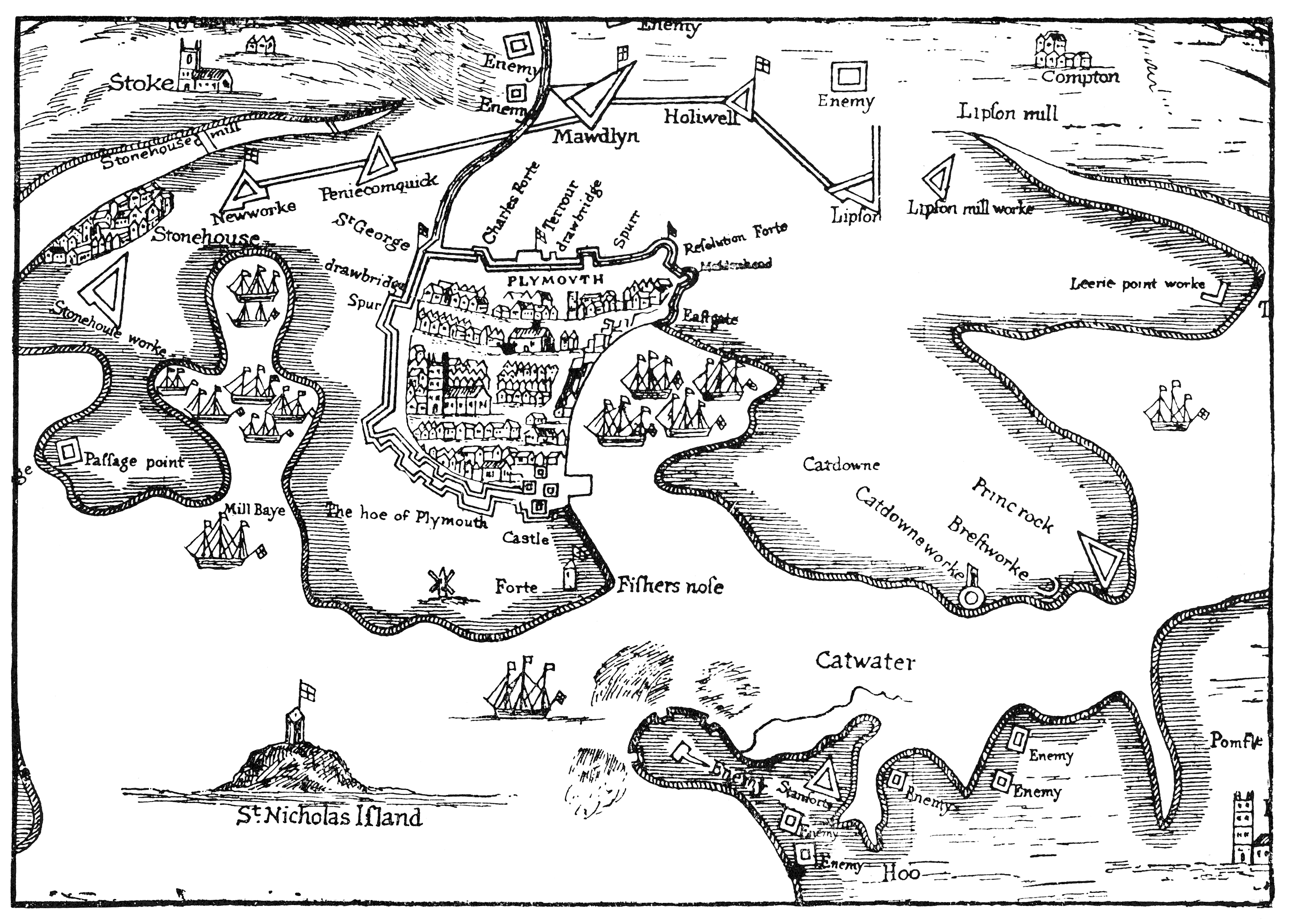
Contemporary map of Plymouth during the Civil War, showing the extent of Millbay

During the English Civil War, Plymouth declared for Parliament and was the subject of a prolonged Royalist siege between 1642 and 1646. At this time Millbay was the only harbour of Plymouth that was out of reach of the Royalist artillery so it became the sole source of resupply for the town. From the end of the Civil War Millbay reverted to a quiet anchorage with no jetties or port facilities, but in 1756 John Smeaton built a jetty and workyard in the south west corner of the harbour for unloading and working the stone for the third Eddystone Lighthouse. A ten-ton ship, named the Eddystone Boat, was based here and took the worked stones out to the reef.

Smeaton's lighthouse was completed in 1759 and around this time the Long Room (an assembly room), bath house, bowling green and other amenities were built nearby. Of these, only the Long Room survives, built in red brick with Portland stone facings. To its north the Stonehouse Barracks were built, 1779–85. Until Victorian speculators constructed new docks and warehousing, this had a watergate into Millbay from which the navy's soldiers embarked for service at sea.

== 19th-century expansion ==
Before the Great Britain made her appearance, the Severn, Cork steam-vessel, took on board from Gill's Military Pier a large party, and went out to meet her ... The Severn followed the Great Britain into Millbay, firing salutes at intervals.

— Exeter Flying Post, 19 June 1845.

Mill Bay Pier Act 1840
- Act of Parliament
- Parliament of the United Kingdom
- Long title: An Act for erecting and maintaining a Pier and other Works in Mill Bay in the Port of Plymouth in the County of Devon.
- Citation: 3 & 4 Vict. c. cxi

Dates
- Royal assent: 23 July 1840

Text of statute as originally enacted

A map from the late 1830s shows a small "Union Dock" at Millbay, about which not much is known, but the Mill Bay Pier Act 1840 (3 & 4 Vict. c. cxi) granted Thomas Gill the authority to build a pier and other works at the mouth of Millbay as well as deepening the creek. Gill had a quarry at the east side of the harbour, and the pier he built, now known as Millbay Pier, was 500 feet (150 m) long and was completed in 1844. The following year the SS Great Britain berthed here during her maiden voyage to New York and was visited by 15,000 sightseers.

Plymouth Great Western Dock Act 1846
- Act of Parliament
- Parliament of the United Kingdom
- Long title: An Act for constructing Docks at Millbay (Plymouth), to be called the Plymouth Great Western Docks.
- Citation: 9 & 10 Vict. c. ccclxxxiii

Dates
- Royal assent: 18 August 1846

Text of statute as originally enacted

Plymouth Great Western Docks Act 1855
- Act of Parliament
- Parliament of the United Kingdom
- Long title: An Act for extending the Powers of The Plymouth Great Western Dock Company, and for other Purposes.
- Citation: 18 & 19 Vict. c. xlvi

Dates
- Royal assent: 15 June 1855

Text of statute as originally enacted

Plymouth Great Western Dock Act 1858
- Act of Parliament
- Parliament of the United Kingdom
- Long title: An Act for extending the Powers of the Plymouth Great Western Dock Company, and for other Purposes.
- Citation: 21 & 22 Vict. c. cxxxix

Dates
- Royal assent: 2 August 1858

Another act of Parliament, the Plymouth Great Western Dock Act 1846 (9 & 10 Vict. c. ccclxxxiii) established the Plymouth Great Western Dock Company to provide full facilities for shipping at Millbay. Gill sold his Millbay Pier to this company and became a director. Isambard Kingdom Brunel was engaged to design new docks; both he and Gill were involved in the South Devon Railway, so it is no surprise that the first railway station in Plymouth was opened nearby in 1849. The next year a railway extension was built to the new docks, customs facilities were granted and the docks were recognised as a government mail packet station.

Brunel next built another pier, an iron floating pontoon 300 ft (91 m) long by 40 ft (12 m) wide (91 m × 12 m) for the Irish Steamship Company whose vessels were regularly using the harbour. Then he constructed the inner basin, with limestone and granite walls. It had dock gates and a drydock at the western side and was 1,250 by 400 feet (380 by 120 m) in size. It opened in 1857. Part of the earth dam that had been built across the harbour to facilitate the creation of the inner basin was retained for the later construction of Trinity Pier. From then on a few modifications were made, but no major changes took place until the construction of the ferry terminal in the 1970s.

Millbay was a busy commercial dock because it could accommodate larger ships than Sutton Pool, off the Cattewater. A wide range of freight was handled, with grain always being an important import. It was also one of the major coaling stations in the English Channel. A significant amount of shipbuilding took place here: Willoughby Bros Ltd., for example, was in business from 1857 until 1969 and built vessels for the Royal Mail Steamship Company, Customs and Excise and others, as well as chain ferries for Torpoint, Saltash, Littlehampton and Felixstowe.

== Ocean liner traffic ==
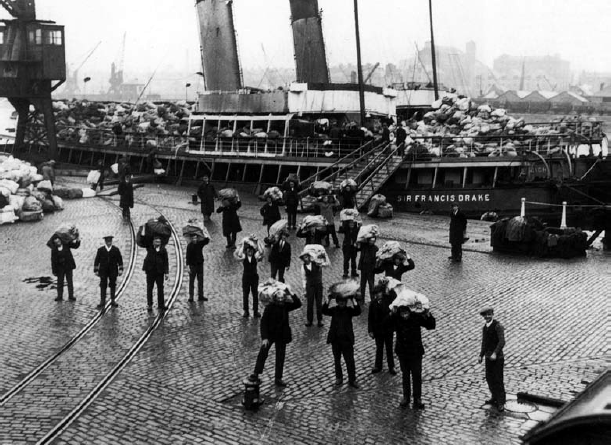
Unloading mail by hand from the Sir Francis Drake at Millbay Docks, March 1926

From the 1870s until the Second World War Millbay was a busy landing point for rich travellers from the USA who preferred to disembark the transatlantic liners in Plymouth Sound, come ashore in tenders and catch fast trains from Millbay station to London Paddington, thereby substantially reducing travel time by avoiding the sea passage to Southampton or Tilbury. It was known as "the route which cuts the corners off". An idea of the scale of this business can be seen from the fact that during the 20th century over six million passengers landed or were embarked from Millbay and as many as 800 passengers would come ashore from one liner. The peak year for liner traffic was 1930, when 788 liner calls were made to Plymouth. Millions of mailbags were handled too.

The railway company quickly became aware of the benefits of this traffic and took the initiative in ordering the first of a series of steamers, the Sir Francis Drake (173 tons), delivered in 1873. It was quickly followed by the smaller Sir Walter Raleigh and in 1883 by the Palmerston and the Smeaton. Many others followed, culminating in the Sir John Hawkins which replaced the ageing Smeaton in 1929. The Sir John Hawkins was 939 tons and was capable of about 14 knots (26 km/h).

On Sunday, 28 April 1912 the majority of the surviving crew of the RMS Titanic disaster disembarked here in secrecy. They were then taken by train from Millbay station to Southampton.

== Today ==
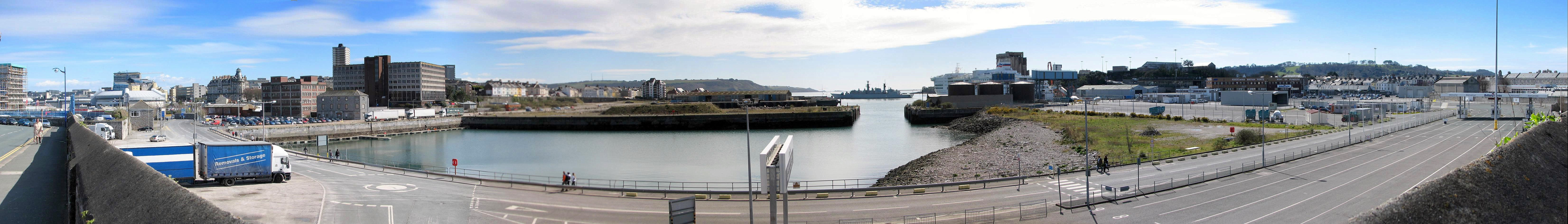
A panorama of Millbay, showing at the right, the Brittany Ferries port with MV Pont-Aven in the dock.

There are currently two large deepwater docks, one of which is part-owned by Brittany Ferries, which has its UK headquarters here. Since 1973 the company has operated ferry services from the dock to Roscoff on the north coast of Brittany, France, and also to Santander on the north coast of Spain. Ferry services depart and arrive daily from March to late October, and less regularly during the winter months.

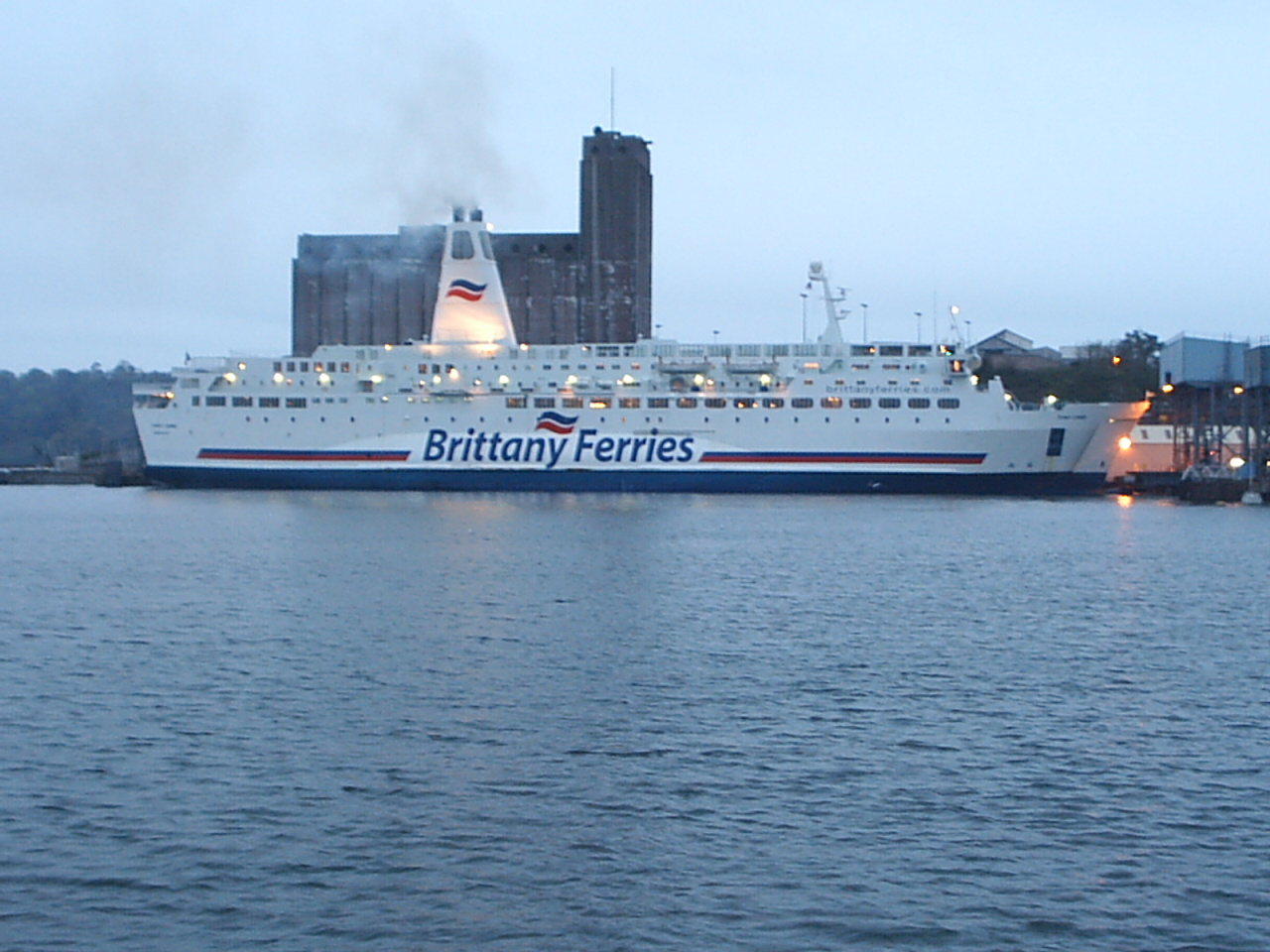
MV Pont L'Abbe at Millbay in 2006. The (now demolished) grain silo is in the background.

The dock was expanded in 2003 to accommodate Brittany Ferries' new 40,000-ton flagship Pont-Aven, and the terminal building was also renovated. The Pont-Aven shares the dock with the new Armorique, the replacement for the Pont L'Abbe. During the winter months, the Bretagne, usually assigned to Portsmouth, sometimes visits Millbay. During February 2008, the Brittany Ferries fastcraft Normandie Express visited Millbay, the first time that a high speed craft had been used out of Millbay.

Millbay is the home of the Plymouth RNLI All-Weather and Inshore Lifeboats, as it has been since 1862. The landmark which most Plymothians remember as the easiest way of locating the entrance to this harbour, a huge boxlike grey concrete grain silo with a substantial tower was demolished in early 2008.

Millbay is currently undergoing significant change after the area was targeted as a strategic priority for regeneration in Plymouth, being seen as 'a key opportunity within Plymouth's overall regeneration, given its waterfront location, proximity to the city centre, and gateway status' (PCC, 2005).

The area had suffered from high crime rates (not least for having been Plymouth's busiest and notorious red light district for more than a century) and lay within the St Peter's Ward, ranked as Plymouth's most deprived ward and within the top 10% of deprived wards in England. (From the Indices of Multiple Deprivation 2004).

Regeneration proposals were prepared over a number of years through a partnership between the local community, Plymouth City Council, South West Regional Development Agency, English Partnerships, along with the lead developer English Cities Fund (a joint venture public-private partnership between Muse Developments, Legal and General Property and Homes and Communities Agency).

The Millbay and Stonehouse Area Action Plan 2006-2021 was adopted by Plymouth City Council in 2007. In the same year the first Millbay Masterplan received planning consent and this was updated in 2015.

Millbay's first new development, Cargo, was completed in 2010. Following this considerable progress has been made in delivering the regeneration vision for Millbay.

Major works to dredge Millbay's inner basin and restore its historic listed quay walls enabled Millbay to host the Race Village for the America's Cup World Series event in Plymouth in 2011 and facilitated the development of the new 171-berth King Point Marina, which opened in 2013.

By mid-2016 regeneration in Millbay had resulted in more than 400 new homes, 19,000 sq ft of new business space, a new 1,000-pupil school (Plymouth School of Creative Arts) and King Point Marina.

Public realm improvements of this regeneration include newly landscaped quaysides opened to the public and the first section of a new boulevard (Isambard Brunel Way) aimed at reconnecting city centre and waterfront, a long-held Plymouth planning policy aim.
