= Plymstock railway station =

Disused railway station in Plymstock, Plymouth

Coordinates: 50.3671°N 4.1017°W

Plymstock

General information
- Location: Plymstock, Plymouth; England
- Platforms: 2

Other information
- Status: Disused

History
- Original company: London and South Western Railway
- Pre-grouping: London and South Western Railway
- Post-grouping: Southern Railway; British Railways (Southern Region)

Key dates
- 5 September 1892: Opened
- 15 January 1951: Temporary closed
- 2 July 1951: Reopened
- 10 September 1951: Closed to passengers
- 30 September 1961: Closed to goods
Location

Plymstock railway station served the suburb of Plymstock, Plymouth, England from 1892 to 1961 on the Plymouth to Yealmpton Branch.

== History ==
The station opened on 5 September 1892 by the London and South Western Railway. It originally opened on 1 July 1892 but it didn't serve passengers. The signal box was moved onto the platform in 1935. It was later destroyed along with the ticket office by a bomb in March 1941 during the Second World War. They were rebuilt quickly. The station closed on 15 January 1951 but reopened on 2 July 1951, only to close again to passengers on 10 September 1951. It closed to goods traffic on 30 September 1961. The signal box closed in 1963

Preceding station	Disused railways	Following station
Lucas Terrace Halt; Line and station closed	Plymouth to Yealmpton Branch	Billacombe; Line and station closed
Lucas Terrace Halt; Line and station closed	Turnchapel Branch	Oreston; Line and station closed
