= Yealmpton railway station =

Disused railway station in Yealmpton, South Hams

Coordinates: 50.347°N 3.995°W

Yealmpton

General information
- Location: Yealmpton, South Hams; England
- Platforms: 1

Other information
- Status: Disused

History
- Original company: Plymouth to Yealmpton Branch
- Pre-grouping: Great Western Railway
- Post-grouping: Great Western Railway

Key dates
- 15 January 1898: Station opened
- 7 July 1930: closed
- 3 November 1941: opened
- 6 October 1947: Station closed to passengers
- 29 February 1960: Station closed to freight
Location

Yealmpton station was a stone built railway station in Devon, England, and was the terminus of the Plymouth to Yealmpton Branch built to the south and across the River Yealm from the town of Yealmpton.

== History ==
From 1898 to 1960, Yealmpton was the terminus of the Yealmpton to Plymouth branch railway line. The line was built by the Great Western Railway. In its early days the line carried passengers and freight. The growth in the number of motor cars and buses led to reducing passenger traffic in the 1920s and passenger services ceased on the line in 1930. Freight traffic continued to run until passenger services were restored in 1941, as villages such as Yealmpton were then being used as dormitory areas by the people of Plymouth following the severe air raids on the city. The passenger services ceased again in October 1947 and freight services only ran until 1960, when the line closed completely. The station at Yealmpton was demolished and housing in Riverside Walk now stands on the site.

Preceding station	Disused railways	Following station
Steer Point; Line and station closed	Plymouth to Yealmpton Branch	Terminus
