= Plymouth Millbay railway station =

Former railway station in Devon, England

Plymouth Millbay
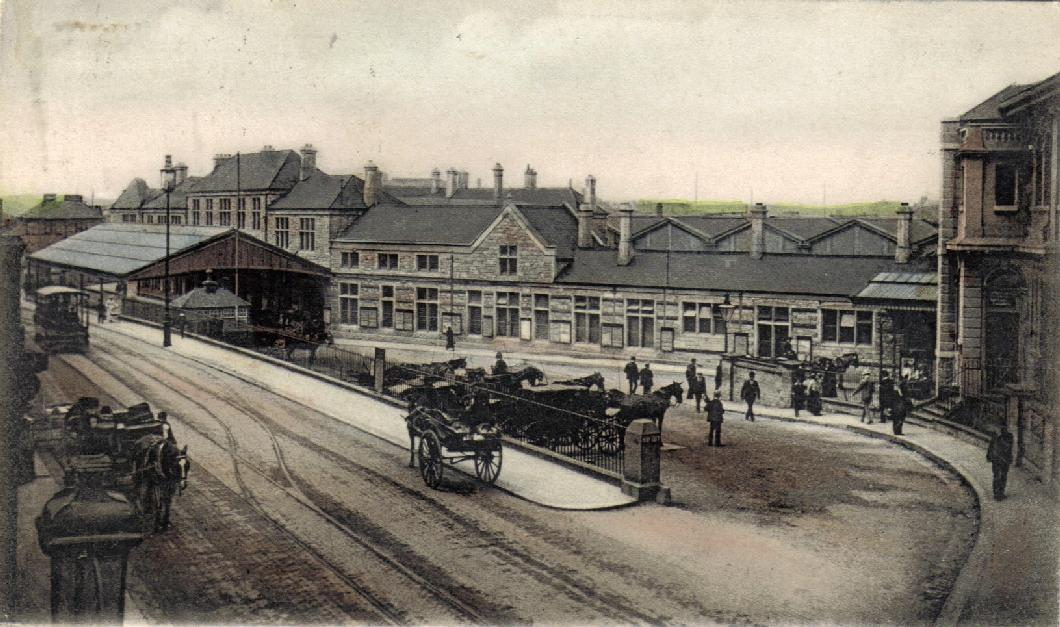
- The station after its 1903 rebuilding

General information
- Location: Plymouth, Devon, England
- Coordinates: 50.3683°N 4.1501°W
- Grid reference: SX472542

Other information
- Status: Disused

History
- Original company: South Devon Railway
- Pre-grouping: Great Western Railway
- Post-grouping: Great Western Railway

Key dates
- 2 April 1849: Opened
- 1859: Junction for Cornwall Railway opened
- 1941: Closed to passengers
- 1969: Closed to goods traffic
- 1971: Line closed
Location

Plymouth Millbay was the original railway terminus that served the city of Plymouth, in Devon, England. It was used for passenger trains from 1849 to 1941; it was rebuilt in 1903.

== History ==
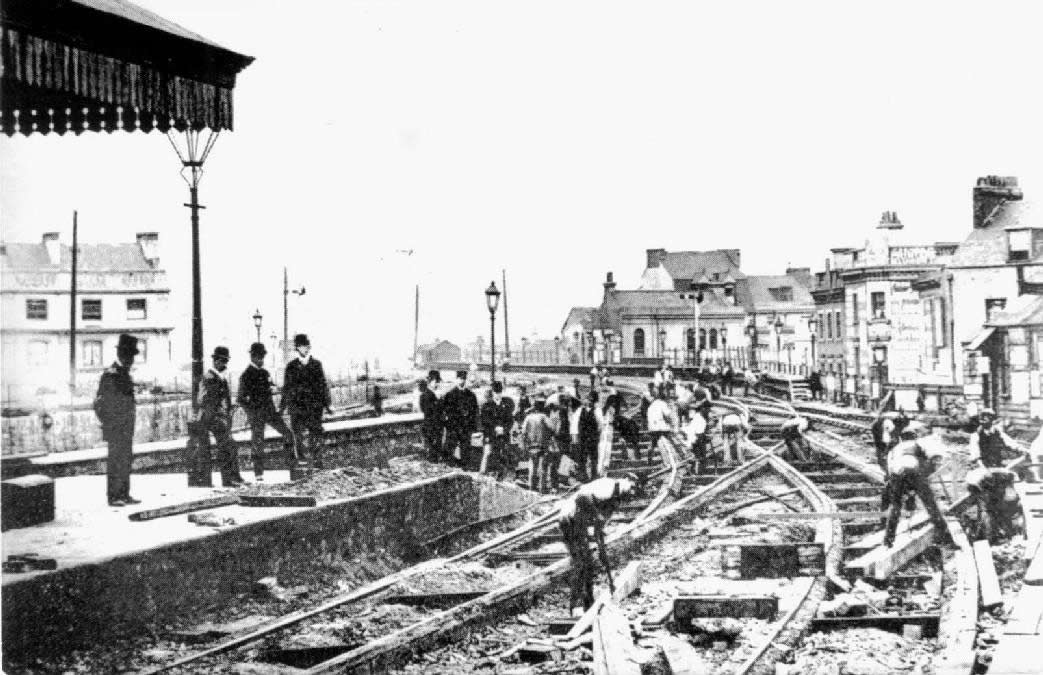
Converting the gauge, 21 May 1892

The South Devon Railway originally planned to bring its 7 ft (2,134 mm) broad gauge railway from Exeter St Davids to the Eldad area of Plymouth, terminating on a hill above Stonehouse Pool. In the event, it was redesigned to end at a station situated between Union Street and Millbay itself.

The railway reached a temporary station at Laira on the eastern outskirts of Plymouth on 5 May 1848 and was extended to Millbay on 2 April 1849. At this time, the station was just known as Plymouth as no other stations existed in the town. The station became known as Plymouth Millbay, after other stations were opened in the town in 1876–7 at Mutley and North Road.

A separate ticket platform was erected just outside the station in 1851 and was used until 1896. This enabled all tickets to be checked while the train paused outside the station; the opportunity was often taken for the engine to be detached and sent to the engine shed at this time. The train was then propelled into the platforms by a pilot engine.

The station was expanded ready for the opening of the Cornwall Railway on 4 May 1859 and the South Devon and Tavistock Railway on 22 June 1859. The railway encouraged the private venture of the Plymouth Hotel Company to open the Duke of Cornwall Hotel opposite the station in 1862.

The South Devon Railway was amalgamated into the Great Western Railway (GWR) on 1 February 1876. The lines were converted to 4 ft 8 1/2 in (1,435 mm) standard gauge on 21 May 1892, although standard gauge goods trains were working to the docks from 1878 over mixed gauge tracks. The station was extensively rebuilt in 1900-03, when the old wooden buildings were replaced by a new stone terminus.

The station was closed to passengers on 23 April 1941, after bombs destroyed the nearby goods depot; the passenger station was only used thereafter for goods traffic and access to the carriage sheds. All traffic ceased from 14 December 1969, except for goods trains running through to the docks which continued until 30 June 1971.

== Description ==
When first opened, the platforms were covered by a large wooden roof but more conventional canopies were provided when the station was redesigned in 1900–03. Outside the station was the South Devon Railway headquarters building, on the east side of the forecourt; opposite was the independent Duke of Cornwall Hotel which accommodated passengers for the trains and ships.

The line from Millbay Docks crossed Millbay Road on a level crossing, then climbed up a gradient between the main station and the goods shed. Alongside the level crossing was a bridge that carried some of the sidings of the goods depot.

The station was built at the higher level on the back of the hill that forms Plymouth Hoe. It was partly on a viaduct; the arches of which were rented out to local businesses and, later, used as a garage for local railway buses. Trains waiting to depart faced north-eastwards but, crossing Union Street on an iron bridge, the line swung northwards. It then passed a complex of carriage and engine sheds before reaching Cornwall Junction, near the bridge carrying Five Fields Lane (now North Road West), where the line to Penzance diverged to the north-west and that to London turned to the east.

== Millbay Docks ==
The Plymouth Great Western Docks were constructed, as was the railway, under the supervision of Isambard Kingdom Brunel but they were owned by an independent company in which the railway invested. The inner basin was opened in 1857 but, before the end of the year, a gale had caused extensive damage which led to financial trouble; the South Devon Railway subsequently acquired an increasing share in the company, until it took full control in 1874.

A siding had been laid into the docks in 1850 which crossed Millbay Road on a level crossing and was worked by horses; South Devon Railway 0-4-0 locomotives operated in the docks from 1873. Extensions were laid to the West Wharf and Graving Dock in the late 1870s and, from 18 June 1878, a third rail was added to allow access for London and South Western Railway (LSWR) goods traffic. The first passenger trains started to run through to the East Quay in 1882, generally running non-stop to London Paddington except for locomotive changes.

Competition with the LSWR's services from Ocean Quay on Stonehouse Pool lead to increasing speeds from 1904, although mail was only contracted to be carried on the GWR services. On 9 May 1904, City of Truro was the first locomotive recorded in excess of 100 mph (160 km/h) while working one of the GWR's trains, with the whole journey to London taking just 3 hours 54 minutes. The GWR route was shortened by 20.2 miles (32.5 km) on 1 July 1906, with the opening of the Castle Cary Cut-Off line that avoided the "Great Way Round" through Bristol Temple Meads. In the early hours of 30 June 1906, an LSWR special had derailed at high speed passing through Salisbury, after which speeds returned to a more sedate pace with trains taking around five hours. The LSWR service was closed in 1910.

The quayside was open to the elements until 1905, when a canopy was provided, although passengers and their luggage were dealt with in the lower floors of some Brunel-designed warehouses. Improved accommodation was provided in 1936; the new floor of which was decorated with the GWR's "land at Plymouth and save a day" advertising slogan, which referred to the time saved by trans-Atlantic passengers being carried ashore by lighter at Plymouth from liners bound for London, via Southampton or Le Havre.

A new swing bridge with a railway track was put in place in 1945, to link Glasgow Quay (opposite the entrance from Millbay station) and South Quay.

The last passenger trains ran from the docks in 1963, which was the final year of trans-Atlantic liners calling at the port. Freight traffic continued until 30 June 1971.

== Signalling ==
The first signal box was built in 1899, as one of the first stages of the rebuilding of the station. This 70 feet (21 m) long structure was on the east side of the line with 117 levers in a Type DT frame. It was replaced in 1914 by a 58 feet (18 m) long box, which housed 115 levers in a Type HT3 frame. This, in turn, was closed on 14 December 1969 when control of the remaining trains was transferred to the new Plymouth Panel Signal Box at North Road.

Another small box was provided at Millbay Crossing to control the level crossing on Millbay Road.

== The site today ==
The site is now occupied by the Plymouth Pavilions leisure complex. Two granite gate posts outside the Millbay Road entrance are all that is left of the station; they still show traces of bomb or enemy aeroplane cannon damage from the Plymouth Blitz.

An old railway goods shed on the docks branch still stands, in what used to be Washington Place.

== Routes ==
Preceding station	Disused railways	Following station
North Road	Great Western Railway; South Devon Main Line and Launceston Branch	Terminus
Terminus	Great Western Railway; Cornish Main Line	Wingfield Villas

== See also ==
- Railways in Plymouth
- Disused railway stations (Exeter to Plymouth Line)
- Disused railway stations (Plymouth to Penzance Line).
