= Turnchapel Branch =

Railway line in Devon, England

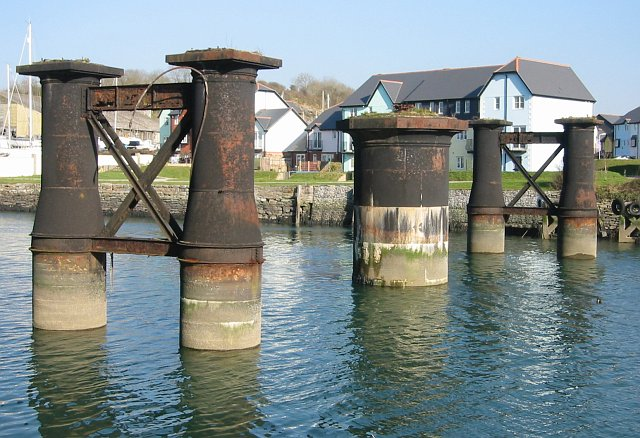
The remains of Hooe Lake swing bridge at Turnchapel

The Turnchapel Branch was a London and South Western Railway (LSWR) single track branch railway line in Devon, England, that ran from Plymouth Friary station to Turnchapel. It crossed the River Plym and opened up the east side of the river to rail connections. The short line opened in 1892 (as far as Plymstock) and 1897 (throughout). It closed in 1951 to passengers, and in 1961 completely.

There were three intermediate stations, Lucas Terrace Halt (from 1905), Plymstock (opened 1892) and Oreston. There was a siding serving the Bayly Bartlett Wharf

== History ==
The Plymouth and Dartmoor Railway (P&DR) had been built as a horse-operated tramway to open up the agriculture of the area around Princetown, on Dartmoor. That objective was largely unsuccessful, but the line proved useful in bringing granite down from quarries below Princetown to the tidal waters around Plymouth, for onward transport by coastal shipping. It had opened in 1823, but it increasingly became dependent on the Johnson Brothers who operated the quarries, and in 1865 shares in the Company were predominantly owned by William Johnson. The reconstituted company was not short of funds, and aside from the granite traffic it had the advantage of ownership of lands adjacent to the waters of the River Plym at Laira and elsewhere in Plymouth.

The London and South Western Railway (LSWR) was anxious to develop its interests in Plymouth and made an ally of the P&DR at a time, in the 1870s, when the rival Great Western Railway (GWR) was dominant. (Note: The Associated Companies, consisting of the GWR, the Bristol and Exeter Railway and the South Devon Railway worked in concert, and amalgamated, forming the new Great Western Railway in 1876. The Cornwall Railway was worked by the SDR and then the GWR. A through route between Penzance and London was operated by this group.)

The LSWR had established a terminal for goods services at Friary, on the east side of central Plymouth, opening in 1878. When they secured an independent route to Plymouth (over the Plymouth, Devonport and South Western Junction Railway) they greatly expanded the Friary site and built a passenger terminal there, as well as extending the goods facilities and providing locomotive serving facilities; these opened in 1891.

The P&DR had been encouraged by the LSWR to obtain legal powers to build a short line from Friary to Turnchapel with a branch to Clovelly Bay; the line was to cross the River Plym to Pomphlett (later called Plymstock). The act of Parliament giving authorisation was granted on 2 August 1883 but not acted upon at once. However this incursion across the Plym alarmed the GWR, who feared extension into the South Hams and possibly a new competing line to Exeter, and opposing schemes to build from Pomphlett to Modbury were put forward. The initial frenzy was followed by calmer counsel and at length the Yealmpton branch was built and owned by the GWR, branching off at Plymstock.

== Partial opening ==
Although authorisation was obtained in 1883, progress on the work was slow, but the bridge crossing the Plym, adjacent to the so-called iron road bridge, was ready in 1887; the railway line itself (to Pomphlett) was ready on 25 June 1888, from which date the LSWR operated a goods service "experimentally".

The LSWR agreed to upgrade the line for passenger operation; they retained income from working the line to offset against the cost of the upgrade, which was the P&DR's responsibility. The line as far as Pomphlett was opened to passenger trains on 5 September 1892. (Note: There had been an official "opening" on 1 July 1892 but modifications were required before public trains could be operated.) The station at Pomphlett was "to general surprise" named Plymstock.

After considerable wrangling over the South Hams line to Modbury, agreement was reached with the GWR and the LSWR and P&DR abandoned aspirations to enter that area, and the P&DR revived lapsed powers to extend to Turnchapel, but now omitting the Clovelly Bay branch; these powers were authorised on 3 July 1891. It was put forward for opening and inspected by Lt-Col Addison in May 1896, but he refused to authorise opening. There was no interlocking between the operation of the swing bridge near Turnchapel and train signalling, and parts of the route were outside the authorised limits of deviation. Agreement was later reached authorising opening, and the section from Plymstock to Turnchapel opened to traffic on 1 January 1897.

The LSWR operated train services on the line, the P&DR remaining simply the owner of the infrastructure; the LSWR retained 50% of receipts.

From 15 January 1898 the GWR started operating its own passenger train service from its Millbay station in Plymouth to Yealmpton; this ran by agreement over the LSWR line from Cattewater Junction to Plymstock, which included the bridge over the River Plym.

== From 1923 ==
The railways of Great Britain were subject to the Railways Act 1922 by which most of them were "grouped", and both the LSWR and the Plymouth and Dartmoor Railway passed into the ownership of the new Southern Railway. The Transport Act 1947 imposed further reorganisation, taking the railways into national ownership under British Railways in 1948.

The rise of urban bus services led to a steep decline in passenger carryings on the line, and passenger trains were withdrawn on 10 September 1951; goods trains continued to run until 30 October 1961.

== See also ==
- Railways in Plymouth
