= Plymouth to Yealmpton Branch =

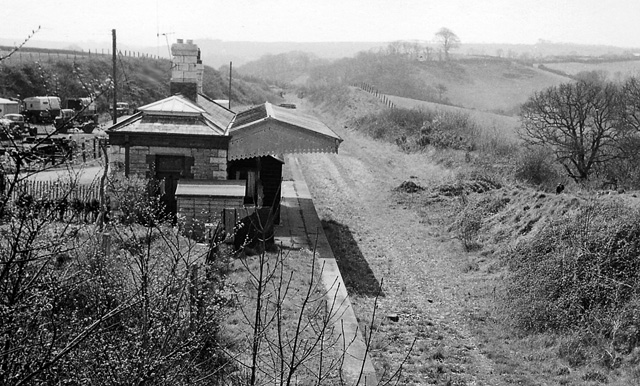
Brixton Road station

The Plymouth to Yealmpton Branch was a Great Western Railway single track branch railway line in Devon, England, that ran from Plymstock to Yealmpton. The line was planned as part of a route to Modbury, but the scheme was cut back to Yealmpton; it opened in 1898, and the passenger train service ran from Plymouth Millbay, but road competition led to declining usage and the passenger service was withdrawn in 1930.

During heavy air raids in 1941 many Plymouth workers preferred to find accommodation outside the city, and in 1941 the passenger service was reinstated, transferring to Plymouth Friary as the terminal. This service ceased in 1947 and the goods service on the line finished in 1960.

== Background ==
The broad gauge group of companies, called the Associated Companies, had early on established main line primacy in the Plymouth area, the South Devon Railway having reached the city in 1849. The rival London and South Western Railway (LSWR) had long had ambitions to reach the city, and its trains first entered Plymouth in 1876. However this was not entirely satisfactory, as the trains had to run over the South Devon Railway's Tavistock line for the final approach to Plymouth, and work started on an independent line in 1887, through the medium of a friendly company, the Plymouth, Devonport and South Western Junction Railway.

Seeing that it was now in sight of establishing itself in the city, the LSWR planned a large Plymouth terminal, which became Plymouth Friary station and goods depot, and it acquired a moribund mineral line, the Plymouth and Dartmoor Railway (P&DR), and through it obtained an act of Parliament, Plymouth and Dartmoor Railway Act 1883 (46 & 47 Vict. c. cxxxix), authorising the Turnchapel Branch.

The Associated Companies had by this time amalgamated and become the Great Western Railway (GWR), and these competing developments were alarming to it. Now a South Hams Railway, branching from the Turnchapel branch and running through Yealmpton to Modbury, was authorised by the Plymouth and Dartmoor Railway (South Hams Extension) Act 1888 (51 & 52 Vict. c. liii) of 28 June 1888. The GWR feared its extension to Torbay and Exeter, areas it considered to be its own.

However aggressive rivalry was modified to collaboration, and by the Great Western Railway (No. 2) Act 1894 (57 & 58 Vict. c. clxxvii) the South Hams line was modified, the rights for the portion as far as Yealmpton being transferred to the GWR, the LSWR retaining the section beyond, and mutual running powers being applied.

== Construction ==
The contractor appointed was Lucas and Aird. Work on the line started in late December 1895; there was a ceremonial inauguration on 15 January 1898, and the public opening took place on 17 January 1898. As well as the branch line from Plymstock Junction LSWR to Yealmpton, a short spur was built connecting Mount Gould Junction to Cattewater Junction; the trains travelled over the LSWR Turnchapel Branch line for a short distance, including the crossing of the Laira.

The line was inspected by Lieutenant Colonel Sir Horatio Arthur Yorke, Chief Inspector of Railways, Board of Trade who reported that everything was satisfactory on 7 December 1897.

=== Route ===
Passenger trains to Yealmpton from Plymouth Millbay turned at Lipson Junction to Mount Gould Junction, diverging there to Cattewater Junction, where the trains joined the LSWR (nominally P&DR) Turnchapel Branch to cross the Laira by Laira Bridge. At Plymstock the Yealmpton branch diverged east from the Turnchapel line, the passenger station being in the fork of the junction. The short section from Mount Gould Junction to Cattewater Junction was built specially for the Yealmpton service; it was 29 chains (580 m) in length and was called Plymouth no. 2 Loop.

The branch, which was 6 miles 38 chains (10.42 km) in length, was single track between Plymstock and Yealmpton. Its direction ran broadly east with a southward swoop at Brixton Road, with stations at Billacombe, Elburton Cross, Brixton Road, Steer Point, and the terminus at Yealmpton. The line climbed steeply from Plymstock to Billacombe, with a ruling gradient of 1 in 68; from Billacombe it fell again at 1 in 60 for a mile and a half. Then the line was broadly level, with a short climb at 1 in 60 on the approach to Yealmpton. Passengers at Steer Point could use steamers running between the quay at Steer Point and Newton Ferrers.

There was an important quarry and stone crushing plant at Billacombe, which despatched stone by rail. Although it was the terminus of the line, Yealmpton station was still configured as a through station because the proposal had been to build a railway to Modbury, 4.5 mi (7.2 km) away.

== Operation ==
The line was now simply a GWR branch line; passenger trains ran from the GWR Plymouth terminus at Millbay. In 1898 the working timetable showed four return passenger trains on the branch, the first into Plymouth arriving at Millbay at 08:35. Trains called at Elburton only "if required". By 1913 there were nine return passenger journeys as well as a late Saturday train, and three Sunday trips; all were worked by railmotor. The first GWR-operated motor bus service in the area was instituted from Yealmpton to Modbury, the originally projected terminus, from 2 May 1904.

The route was initially popular, particularly in the Plymouth urban area when railmotor trains operated the passenger service, providing a relatively frequent service at convenient stopping points as residential development took place on the periphery of the city. By 1905 it was decided to open a new stopping place, Mount Gould and Tothill Halt, located on the Mount Gould Junction to Cattewater Junction loop, considered to be part of the Yealmpton line. The halt opened on 2 October 1905, and the line here was double track so there were two platforms; it was described by the Inspecting Officer as being "a new stopping place for motor cars" (i.e. the railmotors). However it proved less attractive than anticipated, and it was closed on 1 February 1918.

The line between Plymstock and Yealmpton was at first worked as a single section by electric train staff. Plymstock was a LSWR signalbox. Brixton Road later had a signal box, from 1905, breaking the branch into two sections, but it was closed in 1924 or 1925. When the passenger service was withdrawn in 1930, the signalling was converted to one engine in steam and Yealmpton box was abolished.

By the 1920s competition from motor buses had substantially reduced passenger numbers. The decline was so severe that passenger services were withdrawn from 7 July 1930, with goods traffic only continuing. Steer Point and Elburton Cross stations were demolished, and the remaining stations were rented.

However, during the two summers following closure to passengers, the GWR experimented with a Saturday train service, in 1931 and 1932.

== Second World War ==
During World War II Plymouth suffered an exceptional volume of bombing attacks during the Plymouth blitz, and many workers in essential industries wished to take lodgings in communities outside the city. To accommodate this need, unadvertised workmen's trains were introduced on the branch from 21 July 1941. The Millbay terminus in Plymouth had already suffered from bombing and it had been closed to passengers, so this service used Plymouth, North Road station (the present-day Plymouth station) as its terminus. However, there were problems with congestion at that station, and from 3 November 1941 the service was transferred to operate from the LSWR (by now the Southern Railway) Plymouth Friary terminus. The rolling stock was GWR. The services consisted of eight return railmotor trips, the first inward train arriving at Plymouth Friary at 08:32.

Restoration of the passenger service in 1941 led to provision of electric train token signalling; an intermediate instrument was provided at Brixton Road to recess goods trains there, and a two lever ground frame was provided at Yealmpton. After the second closure, the signalling reverted to one engine in steam on 11 October 1952.

== Closure ==
The passenger services ceased on 6 October 1947, from which date goods trains only ran on the line; it closed completely on 29 February 1960.

== See also ==
- Railways in Plymouth
