= Anna Eliza Bray =

English historical novelist and writer (1790–1883)

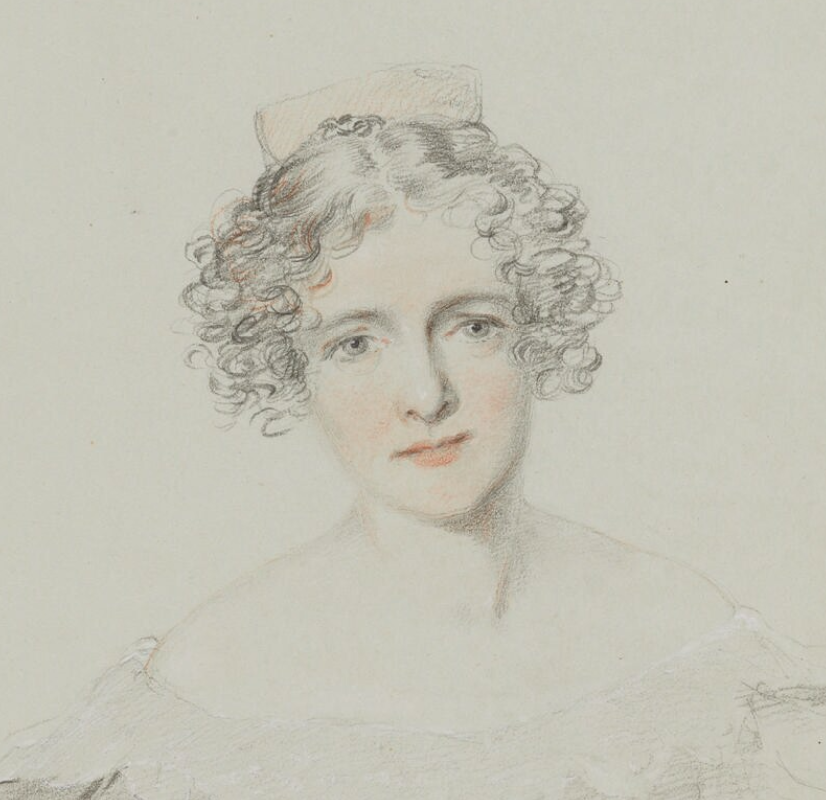
- Born: Anna Eliza Kempe; 25 December 1790; Newington, Surrey
- Died: 21 January 1883 (aged 92)
- Occupation: novelist
- Notable work: The Borders of the Tamar and Tavy (1836)

Anna Eliza Bray (born Kempe, afterwards Stothard; 25 December 1790 – 21 January 1883) was an English historical novelist. She also wrote several non-fiction works.

== Biography ==
Anna Eliza Kempe was born in the parish of Newington, Surrey on 25 December 1790, to John Kempe, a bullion porter in the Royal Mint, and Ann, daughter of James Arrow of Westminster. Kempe planned to be an actress, and her public appearance at the Bath Theatre was duly announced for 27 May 1815. However, she caught a severe cold on her journey, which prevented her appearance, and the opportunity was lost. In February 1818, she married Charles Alfred Stothard, son of the noted painter Thomas Stothard R. A. They travelled to France, and her first work consisted of Letters written during a Tour in Normandy, Brittany, &c., in 1818.

As an artist, her husband was devoted to illustrating the funerary monuments of Great Britain, but on 28 May 1821 he fell off a ladder and died in St Andrew's Church, Bere Ferrers, Devon, while collecting materials for his work The Monumental Effigies of Great Britain. She had one child by him, a daughter (born 29 June 1821, died 2 February 1822). In 1823 she produced a memoir of her late husband and undertook to complete the book he had left unfinished, with the aid of her brother Alfred John Kempe. She eventually did so and the work appeared in 1832. She left the original drawings of his work to the British Museum on her death.

Many years later she provided the Gentleman's Magazine and Blackwood's Magazine with reminiscences of her father-in-law, Thomas Stothard, R. A. These were afterwards (1851) expanded into a life of that artist.

A year or two after Stothard died, Anna Eliza married Edward Atkyns Bray, Vicar of Tavistock. She then began writing historical novels, and from 1826 to 1874 produced at least a dozen. Some, such as The Talba, or the Moor of Portugal (1830) deal with foreign life, but her most popular ones revived the principal families of the counties of Devon and Cornwall, such as the Trelawneys of Trelawne, the Pomeroys, and the Courtenays of Walreddon. They proved so popular that a set of ten volumes by Longmans appeared in 1845–1846 and was reprinted by Chapman & Hall as late as 1884. While she was living in Tavistock, Bray discovered and took up a young lady's maid, Mary Colling, who had produced a book of poetry, which Bray arranged to have published.

Ann Bray's second husband died in 1857. She then moved to London, where she selected and edited some of his poetry and sermons, before returning to original work. Her last years were embittered by a report that on a visit to Bayeux in 1816, she had stolen a piece of the Bayeux Tapestry. However, her character was cleared by correspondence and leading articles that appeared in the Times. She died in London on 21 January 1883. Her autobiography up to 1843 was published by her nephew, John A. Kempe, in 1884, although it is sketchy and inaccurate. It depicts an accomplished and kindly woman, proud of her own creations and enthusiastic in praise of the literary characters she knew.

== Other works ==
Bray wrote many other works in addition to those mentioned so far. They included The Borders of the Tamar and the Tavy (1836, 3 vols.), which describes in a series of letters to Southey the traditions, legends and superstitions that surround the town of Tavistock, on the borders of the River Tamar and the River Tavy. It was reviewed by Southey himself in the Quarterly Review. The remainder copies were issued with a new title page by H. G. Bohn in 1838, and a new edition compressed by Mrs Bray herself into two volumes appeared in 1879. Also connected with South-West England are a series of tales for "young people" on the romantic legends connected with Dartmoor and North Cornwall, entitled, A Peep at the Pixies, or Legends of the West (1854).

In 1841, her The Mountains and Lakes of Switzerland, with Notes on the Route there and back was published. After a silence of some years she issued three compilations in French history in 1870, The Good St. Louis and his Times, The Revolt of the Protestants of the Cevennes, and Joan of Arc. These were reported by the author of her entry in the Dictionary of National Biography in 1886 to be "pleasantly written, but lacked historical research that could have made them of permanent value".

Among her other works are Branded, Trelawney, and The White Hoods: an Historical Romance.
