= Charles Knight (engraver) =

English engraver

Charles Parsons Knight (1743–1827?) was an English engraver.

== Life ==
Knight resided in 1781 in Berwick Street, Soho, London, enrolled in London's Royal Academy Schools in 1788, and in 1792 resided in Brompton. He is best known for his engravings, but he also worked as a miniature painter.

In 1803 Knight was one of the original governors of the Society of Engravers. While residing in Hammersmith, at 83 years of age (1826), he published a portrait of the Rev. Thomas Stephen Attwood, minister of Hammersmith. This is presumed to be one of his last works. His daughter Martha also practised as an engraver.

== Works ==
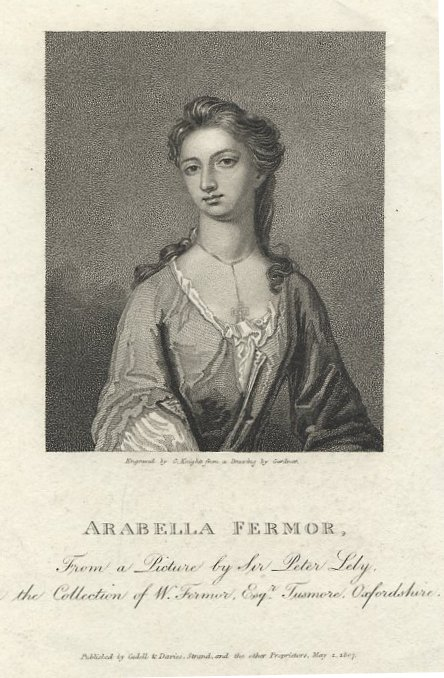
Engraving by Charles Knight of the belle Arabella Fermor, after Peter Lely.

Knight was at first employed on downmarket prints, for such works as Sylvester Harding's Shakespeare Illustrated and the Memoirs of Grammont. He later obtained a better reputation. He engraved subjects after Henry William Bunbury, Angelica Kauffman, Francis Wheatley, Thomas Stothard, John Hodges Benwell, John Hoppner, James Northcote, John Raphael Smith, and others; as well as portraits after Sir Joshua Reynolds, Sir Thomas Lawrence, and others.

Others have been credited with his work, in the past. His engraving of The Spirit of a Child borne to Heaven, after William Peters, has been ascribed to William Dickinson; and his full-length portrait of Elizabeth Farren, Countess of Derby to Francesco Bartolozzi. Knight was in fact working for Dickinson in the early 1780s.
