= James Fahey =

James Fahey may refer to:

- James Charles Fahey (1903–1974), American author
- James Fahey (painter) (1804–1885), English landscape painter
- Jim Fahey (born 1979), American ice hockey player
