= William Sharp (engraver) =

British engraver and artist

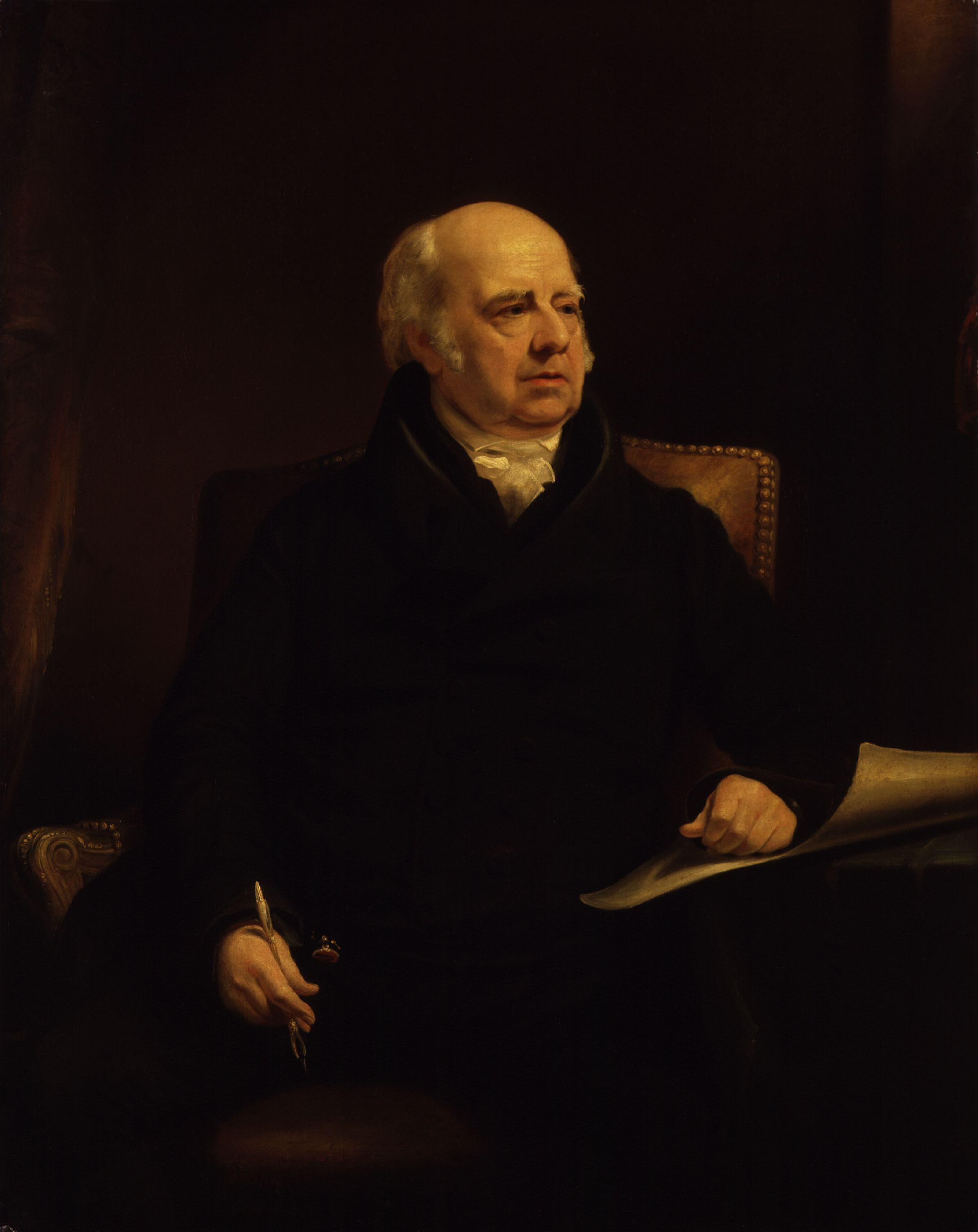
Portrait of William Sharp, by James Lonsdale

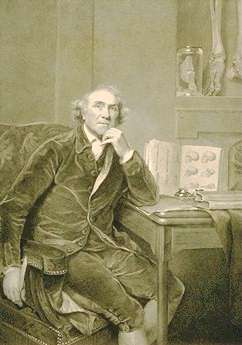
Surgeon John Hunter (after portrait by Sir Joshua Reynolds)

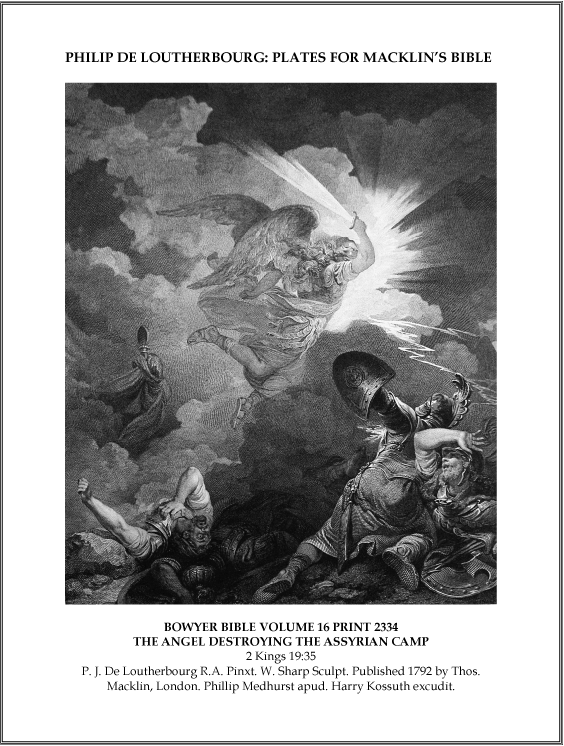
The Angel destroys the Assyrians (from Macklin's Bible, 1792)

William Sharp (29 January 1749 – 25 July 1824), was a British engraver and artist.

== Life and work ==
Sharp was the son of a reputable gunsmith who lived at Haydon's Yard, Minories in central London. He was apprenticed to the 'bright-cut' engraver and genealogist, Barak Longmate (1738–93), and after marriage to a Frenchwoman, set himself up as a writing engraver in Bartholomew Lane (off Threadneedle Street).

His first notable work was an engraving of "Hector", an old lion at the Tower of London. Around 1782, he sold the shop and moved to Vauxhall, intending to specialise in the higher branches (i.e. engraving for printing) of the engraver's art. Among his earlier plates are some illustrations, after Stothard, for the Novelists' Magazine. He also completed the plate of Benjamin West's "Landing of Charles II" which William Woollett had left unfinished at the time of his death, engraved some of the illustrations by artists who travelled with Captain Cook on his famous voyages, and J. H. Benwell's "Children in the Wood". He finally settled at Chiswick where he remained for the rest of his life.

He engraved the "Doctors Disputing on the Immaculateness of the Virgin" and "Ecce Homo" (after Guido Reni); "King Lear in the Storm" and "The Witch of Endor" (after Benjamin West); "The sortie from Gibraltar" (after John Trumbull); the portrait of John Hunter and "The Holy Family" (after Joshua Reynolds); "St Cecilia" (after Domenichino) and "Virgin and Child" (after Dolci).

Sharp's style of engraving was original, the half-tints rich and full. He became an honorary member of the Imperial Academy in Vienna and the Royal Academy in Munich.

Sharp's portrait was painted by George Francis Joseph (1764–1846) and engraved by Sharp himself, and a 3/4-length portrait was painted by James Lonsdale (illustrated). James Thomson (1788–1850) engraved another portrait.

Sharp died in Chiswick on 25 July 1824, and was buried in the parish churchyard there.

== Politics and religion ==
Sharpe was a republican and a friend of Thomas Paine and Horne Tooke, and became a member of the Society for Constitutional Information. As a result of a legal dispute involving Horne Tooke, Sharp was questioned by the Privy Council on charges relating to treason, but was eventually dismissed without punishment as merely an "enthusiast".

He became a convert to the teachings of Mesmer and Swedenborg and came under the religious influence of would-be visionary Jacob Bryan (who worked for Sharp as a printer for a time), and millennialist prophet Richard Brothers, engraving the latter as "Prince of the Hebrews". After Brothers' incarceration in an insane asylum in Islington, Sharp became an adherent of prophetess Joanna Southcott, whom he brought from Exeter to London and kept at his own expense for a considerable time; he made a portrait drawing of her which he engraved. Despite her apparently premature death, he never lost faith in her divine mission or the possibility that she would reappear, and wrote a book in her defence: "An answer to the world etc." (London, 1806).
