= Laarne Castle =

Belgian water castle

- Laarne, East Flanders, Belgium
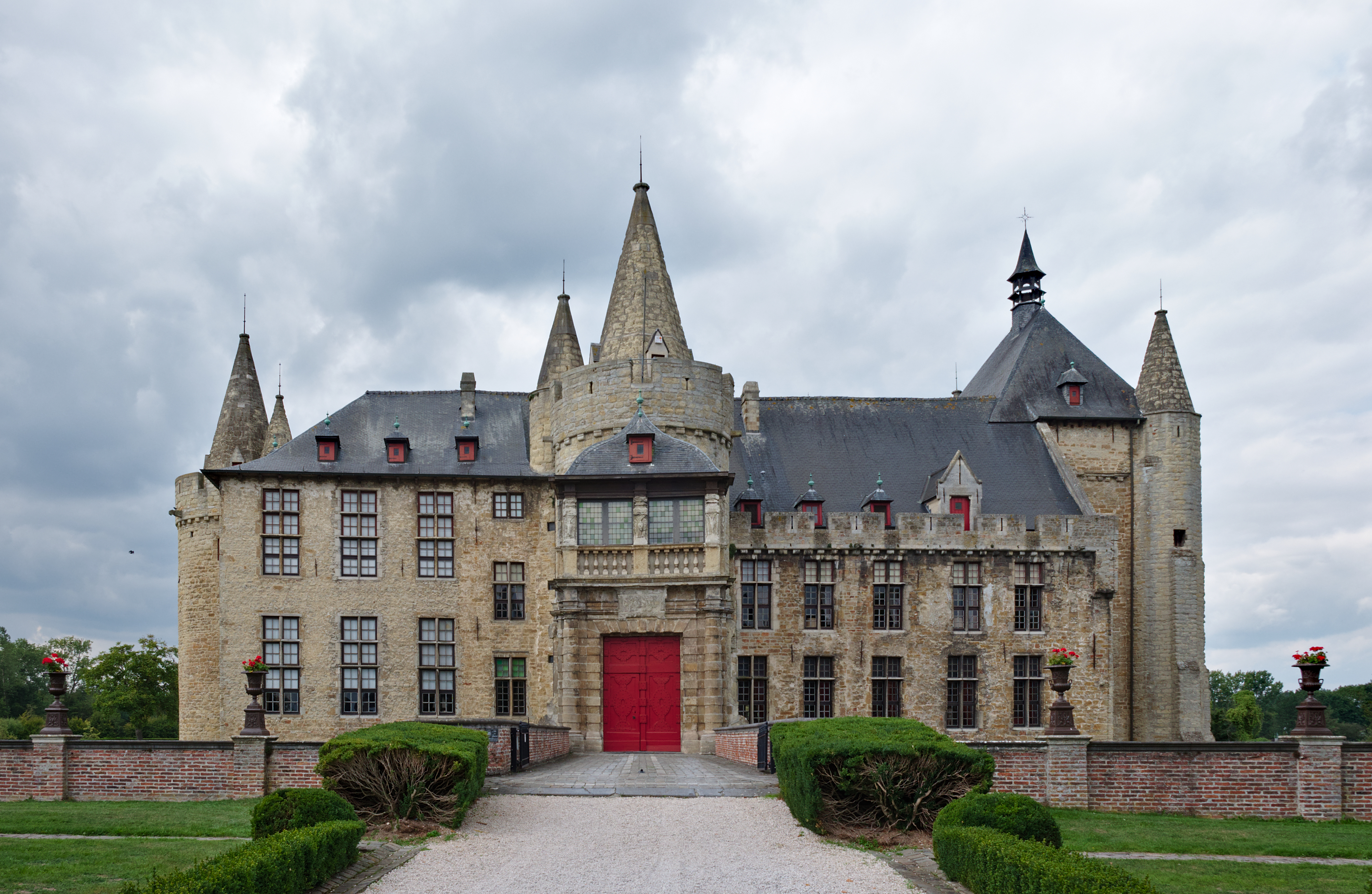
- View of the current main entrance on the castle's east side

Site information
- Type: Water castle
- Owner: Royal Association of Historic Residences and Gardens of Belgium

Location
- Coordinates: 51.028°N 3.838°E

Site history
- Built: c. 1300
- Materials: Limestone

Laarne Castle (Dutch: Kasteel van Laarne) is a water castle near Laarne, East Flanders in Belgium near to the provincial capital of Ghent. Laarne Castle is situated at an elevation of 3 meters.

Laarne is situated approximately 15 kilometres (9.3 mi) south-east of the major historic city of Ghent which was the capital of the County of Flanders.

Beatrix van Massemen, daughter of Diederik, is explicitly mentioned as the lady of Laarne between 1213 and 1222. She was married to Gerard van Zottegem, the second son of Walter, lord of Zottegem. They had at least ten children. Their son, Giselbrecht van Zottegem, outlived his older brothers and became lord of Ressegem, Leeuwergem, Massemen, Laarne and Kalken. Following his marriage to Mathilde van Bethune, daughter of the lord of Dendermonde, he was granted the lordships of Laarne and Kalken in 1228–1229. According to E. Balthau, he probably had the "hof van Laarne" built shortly afterwards, the forerunner of the castle. Various military activities are known of him. In 1214–1215 he was, with two of his brothers and other Flemish nobles, a mercenary in the service of the English king John Lackland during the rebellion of the English nobles. This would lead to Magna Carta in 1215. In 1217–1218 he took part in the 5th Crusade in Egypt, which would lead to the defeat of the Christian army at Damietta in 1218.

A charter with the mention “int hof te Laerne” from 1294 is the first reference to an actual residence on the spot. The first traces of the current castle were built in the early 14th century by the knight Gerard van Massemen who constructed a gatehouse with a wooden bridge across a moat. He added three round towers and a square keep (donjon) connected by walls shortly afterwards. A private chapel was constructed in the keep in around 1350 and fragments of the original wall paintings survive. A castle is mentioned for the first time in a charter between Gerard van Ressegem, lord of Laarne, and his feudal lord the Count of Flanders. In it, the Count is promised the use of the castle in times of war or uprising. When 20 years later the city of Ghent revolted against the count's authority, the castle was besieged and taken. The traces of fire from 22 September 1382 are still visible. It was not until 1390 that Jan van Massemen, son of Gerard, was able to take possession of his castle again.

In 1426, the domain passed into the hands of Baldwin III de Vos, son of Baldwin II de Vos and Elisabeth van Massemen. He was also lord of Lovendegem, Zomergem and Pollare. The tax on salt from 1449 led to a new uprising against Philip the Good, Duke of Burgundy and Count of Flanders. The White Hoods took Laarne, together with Gavere, Poeke and Schendelbeke. The lord of Laarne, Baldwin IV de Vos, was imprisoned in Ghent. An attempt by the Count de Saint Pol to relieve Laarne with a troop of Burgundians failed and 22 of his men fell under the walls of Laarne. A second attempt on 16 December of the same year, by Picard horsemen was more successful. Not long afterwards, wandering troublemakers – known as The Green Tenters – made the region unsafe again. They even managed to occupy Laarne Castle for six years.

In 1505 Laarne passed to the van der Moere family, then for a short period to the van Gavere family. From around 1570 to 1656 the family de Schoutheete van Zuylen d’Erpe was the owner. During the religious troubles - at the time of Frans de Schoutheete who was bailiff of Kortrijk - the castle became “ruyné et bruslé” on 24 July 1579 and was uninhabitable for 10 years.

The Vilsteren family, originating from the Zwolle region, purchased the domain in 1656. Geraard van Vilsteren was also lord of Aartselaar and of Ter Straten in Belsele and Waasmunster. In 1673, Laarne was elevated to a barony. In those years of the Early Modern period, the domain was extensively renovated and acquired its current appearance: the main entrance was moved to the village; the 150-metre-long avenue to the church was constructed; four pavilions were built in the courtyard of honour. Two years later, the castle narrowly escaped destruction: the troops of Louis XIV set fire to both the houses and the church, but spared the castle because the monarch would spend the night there during his inspection tour.

After the death of Geraard van Vilsteren, Baron of Laarne, in 1683, his second wife, Livina-Maria de Beer, daughter of the Baron of Meulebeke, married Jean de Brouchoven, 2nd Count of Bergeyck. This illustrious character was a brilliant servant of the Spanish Crown and Treasurer-General of the Southern Netherlands. The voluptuous form of his mother, Hélène Fourment - who remarried the Count of Bergeyck after the death of Rubens - adorned the Palace of Versailles in those days.

The castle was subsequently inherited by Jacques Joseph van Vilsteren and then his sons François, Nicolaes and Théodore, who all died childless. As a result, the domain came into the hands of Maria-Theresia van Vilsteren, their sister who was married to Libert-François Christijn (1703-1785), a scion of a family of nobles who had acquired an impressive number of lordships and baronies through a well-considered marriage policy, including Ribaucourt in France. In 1796, the castle escaped destruction during the occupation by the Sans-culottes. However, the bell was taken down from the main tower and damage was caused to the chapel. Most of the coats of arms were then hacked away.

One of his descendants, Robert-Jean Christyn, Count de Ribaucourt (1875-1959), who intended to live there permanently, had it restored by the Leuven architect Pierre Langerock. But the First World War and the sudden death of his son Maurice (1903-1914) put an end to those plans and the castle gradually became a ruin. From 1923 to 1927, the popular writer and reporter Jef Crick lived there with his wife in a wing. The artists E. De Buck and H. Broeckaert also moved in for a while.

To save it from total ruin, the castle was leased to Charles, baron Gillès de Pelichy, who hired architect De Tracy for a thorough restoration. According to Dr. Patrick Devos, “the task turned out to be so great that the work that had been started came to a standstill, so that the castle escaped an irrevocable over-restoration.” Since 1943, Laarne Castle has been protected as a monument. The castle is set up as a museum.

From 1943 onwards, a permanent solution was needed. The non-profit organisation Koninklijke Vereniging der Historische Woonsteden en Hoven van België (Royal Association of Historic Residences and Gardens of Belgium) was prepared to take on this considerable task. The last private owner, Robert-Jean Christyn, Count de Ribaucourt, donated the almost completely ruined castle to the association in 1953, whereupon some urgent works were immediately started. From 1962 onwards, the new chairman of the association, knight Joseph de Ghellinck d’Elseghem, under the direction of architect Paul Eeckhout, started large-scale works and in 1967 the castle was able to be opened to the public. To this end, De Ghellinck had the ground floor of the castle redecorated with mainly 17th-century furniture, tapestries and paintings. During his mandate, Mr and Mrs Claude D'Allemagne donated their European-famous silver collection to the Castle. The 446 silver ornaments have since been exhibited in a specially designed room on the first floor. The couple lived in an apartment there until Claude's death in 1986.

It was the chairman of the vzw Historische Woonsteden, Prince Alexandre de Merode, who in 1987 appointed Jonkheer Paul de Pessemier 's Gravendries and his wife as resident managers of the Castle. The old gatehouse, the vestibule, the chapel, the loggia, the roofing, the inner courtyard, the ramparts, the gardens, the northern wing, the pavilions and so on, were thoroughly tackled. In 1996, the Castle was awarded the prestigious Europa Nostra Prize.

In May 2012, the Robert de Ribaucourt Armory was set up and opened to the public. De Pessemier 's Gravendries spent several years tracking down and reclaiming all the archive documents and land registers of the Castle of Laarne that were scattered everywhere. All these artefacts, the oldest of which date from the 14th century, have now been summarily restored, classified and inventoried by Lic. Eric Balthau. Based on his archival research, De Pessemier published several articles on the social, architectural and artistic history of the castle. In 2016, he was awarded the title of Director-Conservator of the Castle of Laarne and in 2021, the title of Honorary Conservator when he was succeeded as director-conservator by Dr. Veronique Lambert.

From 1 January 2023, the management and operation of the castle domain fell under the non-profit organisation Herita, which took it on a 40-year lease. Their first major project was the photo exhibition Les (Dés)Habilleuses by Ghent photographer Eva Rossie.

Since 2024, the 14th-century murals in the keep/chapel have been visible using a light projection.

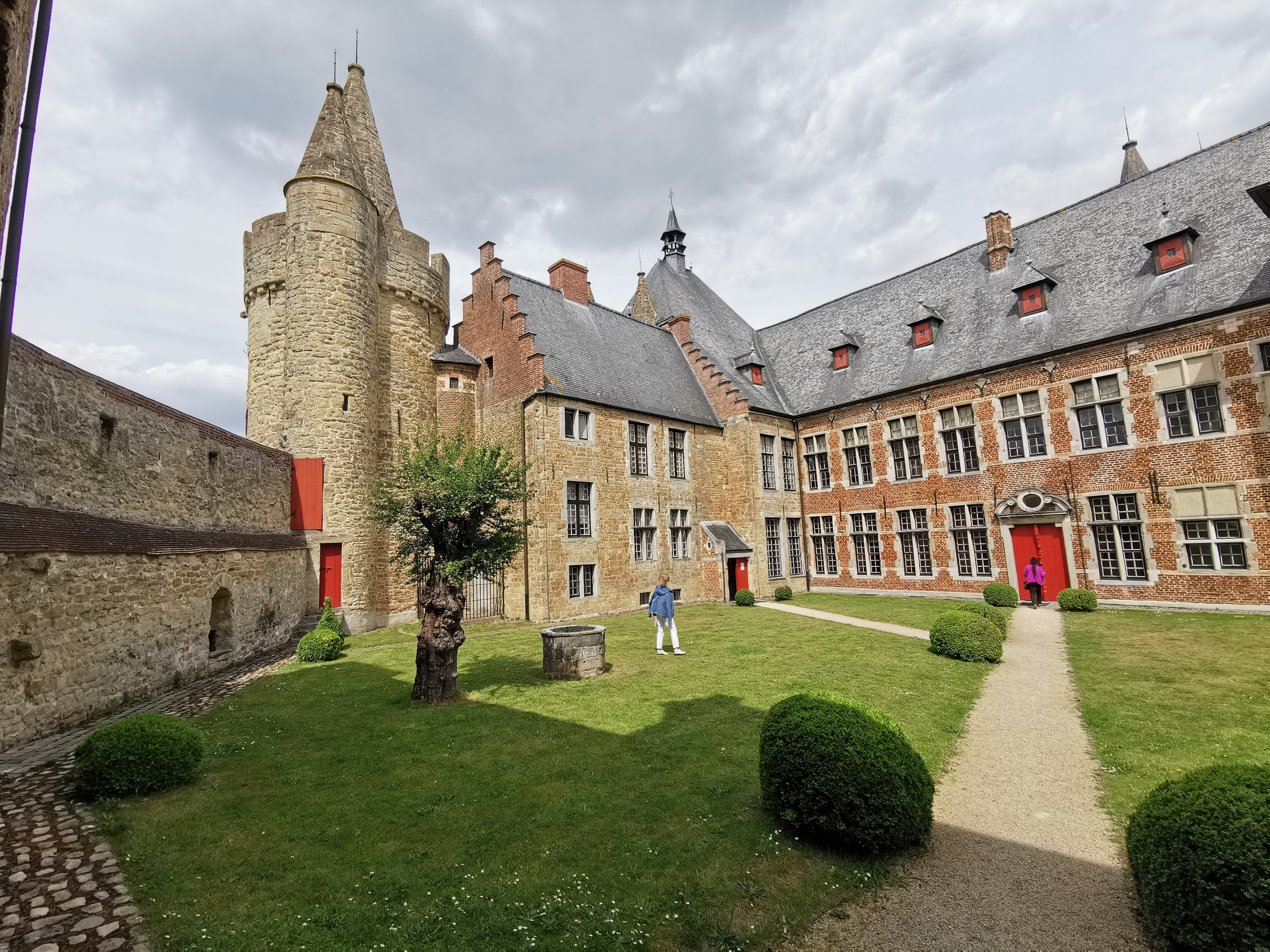
View of the courtyard towards the historic keep on the north side of the castle.

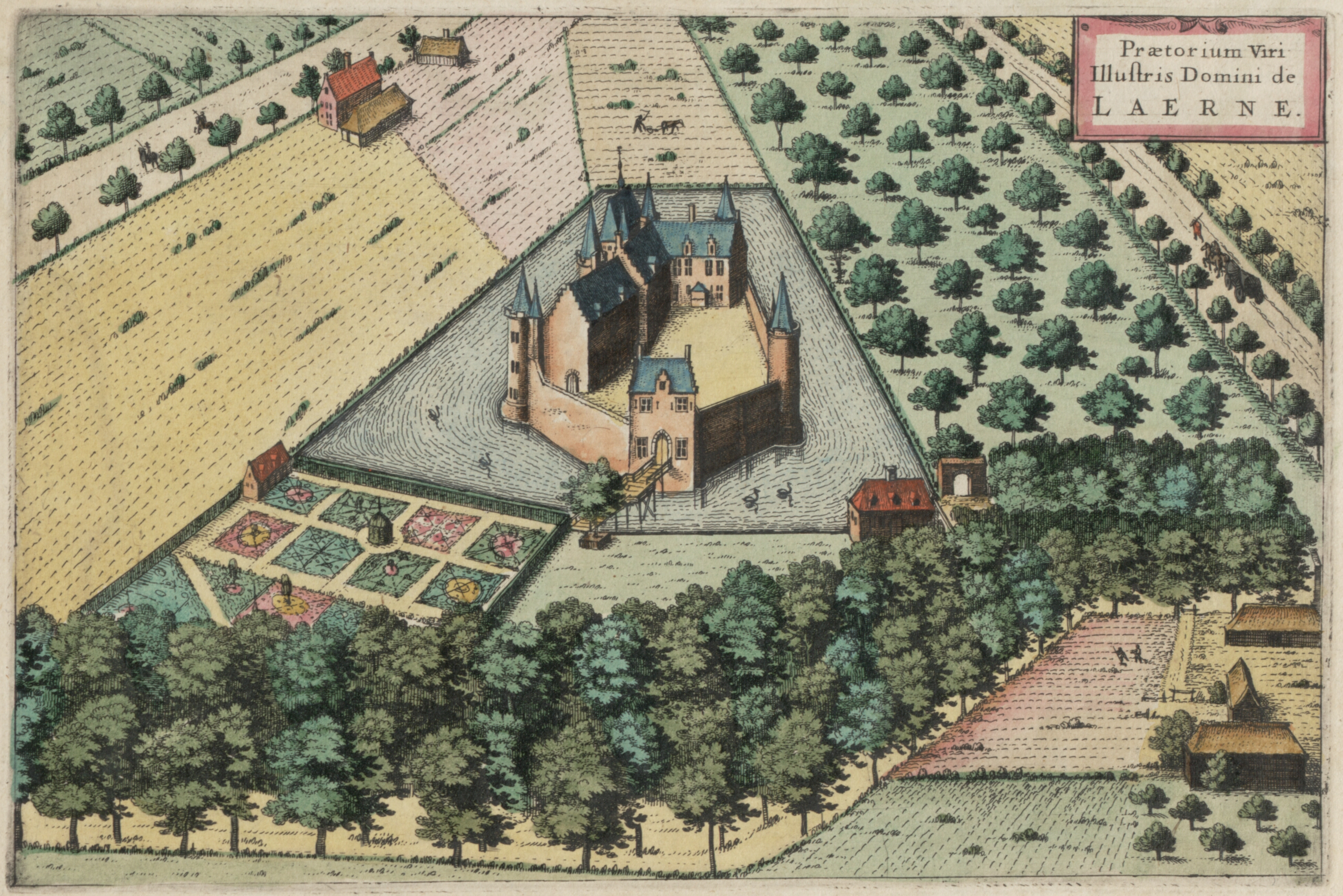
1631 depiction of the castle's western side in Flandria Illustrata, showing its original gatehouse.

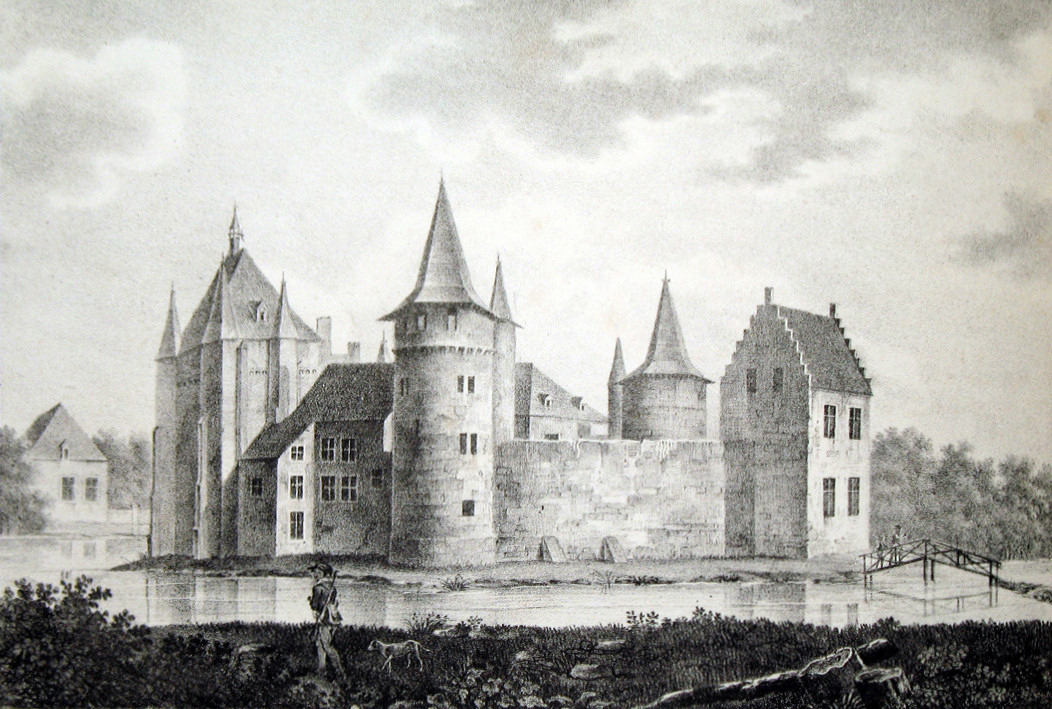
Depiction of the castle's north side in Chateaux et Monumens des Pays-Bas Faisant suite au Voyage pittoresque (1827)

== See also ==
- List of castles in Belgium

== Sources ==
- Website of the Koninklijke Vereniging der Historische Woonsteden en Tuinen van België: Kasteel van Laarne (in Dutch and French)
- HistorischeHuizen.be: Kasteel van Laarne (in Dutch)
