= Mary Colling =

British poet and domestic servant

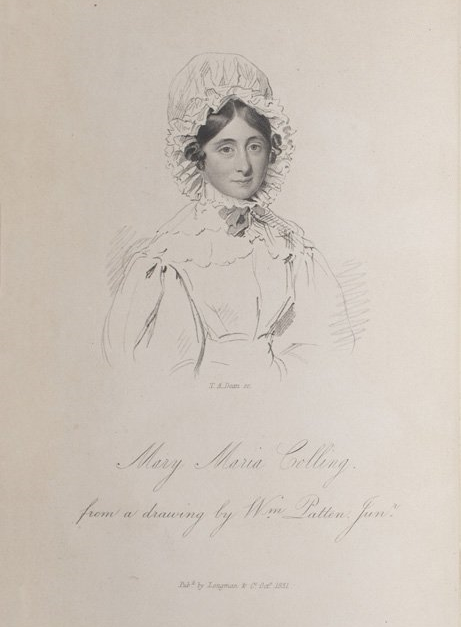
- Portrait included in her book of poetry, by Thomas Anthony Dean
- Born: August 20, 1804; Tavistock
- Died: August 6, 1853 (aged 48); Tavistock

Mary Colling or Mary Maria Colling (20 August 1804– 6 August 1853) was a British poet, and domestic servant.

== Biography ==
She was born Mary Maria Colling on 20 August 1804 to Edmund Colling and Anne, née Domville in Tavistock, Devon. Her father was husbandman and assistant to the surveyor of the highways. She was baptised on 2 September 1804.

She was educated locally from the age of ten, at a dame-school where she learned to read and write and do needlework. She got a position when she was fourteen as a lady's maid.

She drew the attention of Anna Eliza Bray in 1831 and shared her poems, one inspired around 1825 by Rev. Edward Atkyns Bray on hearing him preach about "power of God manifested in the creation of the world". Bray assisted her in getting her work published and considered her a friend, though the vast difference between their classes at the time prevented a closer relationshi. When later publishing her letters, Bray edited them to remove the specific reference to Colling as her friend, while retaining her admiration of her.

Her only book of poems published was Fables and Other Pieces in Verse which included the teaching of values and descriptions of rural life.

Bray shared her discovery of this poet with Robert Southey, the poet laureate.

Colling developed medical issues and spent time in an asylum. She lived with her parents in Tavistock and died of dropsy aged only 48, on 6 August 1853.
