= Edward Atkyns Bray =

British Anglican priest and poet (1778–1857)

Edward Atkyns Bray (1778–1857) was a British poet, vicar, and miscellaneous writer.

Bray was the only son of Edward Bray, solicitor, and manager of the Devonshire estates of the Duke of Bedford, was born at the Abbey House, Tavistock, 18 Dec 1778. His mother, Mary, a daughter of Dr. Brandreth of Houghton Regis, and the widow of Arthur Turner, would not allow her son to be sent to a public school, and he was educated by himself, a circumstance which engendered in him habits of isolation and restraint. At an early age he cultivated poetry, two small selections from his effusions circulating among his friends before he was twenty-three. Bray became a student at the Middle Temple in 1801 and was called to the bar in 1806. For some time he went to the western circuit, but the profession of the law had from the first ill accorded with his disposition, and after five years of trial he abandoned it for the Church. He was ordained by the Bishop of Norwich about 1811, and in the following year, by the favour of the Duke of Bedford, became the vicar of St Eustachius' Church, Tavistock and the perpetual curate of Brent Tor. Almost immediately after his ordination he entered himself at Trinity College, Cambridge, and took the degree of Bachelor of Divinity as a ten-year man in 1822. He lived in Tavistock for the rest of his life, and if he differed from his parishioners on politics or preached over their heads, he retained their respect. In 1822, he married Anna Eliza, the widow of Charles Alfred Stothard, and an amusing account of the habits of the worthy vicar and his wife is embodied in the latter's autobiography. Bray died at Tavistock 17 July 1857. During his lifetime, he published several selections of sermons:

Sermons from the Works of the most eminent Divines of the 16th, 17th, and 18th Centuries, 1818
Discourses from Tracts and Treatises of Eminent Divines, 1821
Select Sermons by Thomas Wilson, Bishop of Sodor and Man, 1823
Discourses on Protestantism, 1829 (his own sermons)

His poetical productions were for the most part circulated privately. After Bray's death his widow collected and published his Poetical Remains (1859, 2 vols), and also A Selection from the Sermons, General and Occasional, of Rev. E. A. Bray (1860, 2 vols). At one time he projected a history of his native town of Tavistock, and made considerable collections for it, but the undertaking was never completed. Many extracts from his journals describing the curiosities of Dartmoor and many of his poems are inserted in his wife's A Description of the Part of Devonshire Bordering on the Tamar and the Tavy (1836). When she published her work on Switzerland she embodied with it many passages in the diary which her husband kept whilst on the tour.
