= Thomas Fielding =

English engraver

Thomas Fielding (fl. 1776–1787), was an English engraver.

Fielding is stated to have been born about 1758. He studied under Francesco Bartolozzi, but more especially under William Wynne Ryland, to whom he acted both as pupil and assistant, and was so much engaged on the engravings bearing that artist's name, that few original works of his own exist. After Ryland's disastrous end, Fielding produced some engravings in his own name. Among them were ‘The Meeting of Jacob and Rachael,’ and ‘Moses saved by Pharaoh's Daughter,’ after Thomas Stothard, R.A .; also ‘Theseus finding his Father's Sword and Sandals,’ and ‘The Death of Procris,’ after Angelica Kauffman, R.A. The latter are finely engraved in Ryland's stipple manner, and quite reach the level of that artist's productions. Little is known of his life, and the year of his death is unknown.

Fielding should be distinguished from an engraver, John Fielding, who preceded him, and about 1750 engraved some prints after Hogarth and others.
