= Edward Henry Fahey =

English painter and draughtsman

Edward Henry Fahey (1844–1907), was an English watercolour painter and draughtsman.

He was born in Brompton, London, the son of James Fahey. Fahey trained in architecture at the South Kensington School and at the Royal Academy Schools, and in Italy from 1866 to 1869. After returning to England he studied painting at the Royal Academy Schools.

His work is in the permanent collections of the V&A Museum and the Salford Museum, as well as the Art Gallery of New South Wales.
