= John Swaine =

English draughtsman and engraver (1775–1860)

- Born: June 26, 1775; Stanwell, Surrey, England
- Died: November 25, 1860 (aged 85); Soho, London, England
- Occupations: Draughtsman; engraver
- Organizations: Childs & Swaine Printers; No. 49 Pearl Street; New York City
- Known for: Business partner of Francis Childs; Facsimile copies of old prints
- Notable work: Shakespeare by Martin Droeshout; William Faithorne's portrait of Thomas Stanley; David Loggan's frontispiece of Book of Common Prayer; Acts of Congress reproduction 1789 to 1797
- Children: John Barak Swaine
- Relatives: James Fahey

John Swaine (26 June 1775 – 25 November 1860) was an English draughtsman and engraver.

== Life and work ==
Swaine was born at Stanwell, Middlesex, on 26 June 1775, the son of John and Margaret Swaine, and became a pupil first of Jacob Schnebbelie and afterwards of Barak Longmate.

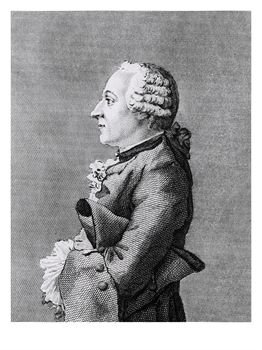
Portrait of Friedrich Melchior, Baron von Grimm (engraved by Swaine after Carmontelle)

He is best known for his excellent facsimile copies of old prints, of which the most noteworthy are the famous portrait of Shakespeare by Martin Droeshout, William Faithorne's portrait of Thomas Stanley, David Loggan's frontispiece to the Book of Common Prayer, and the plates to William Ottley's ‘History of Engraving,’ (1816), and Singer's ‘History of Playing Cards,’ 1816.

He also engraved many illustrations for various scientific, topographical, and antiquarian works, including the whole series of plates in William Marsden's 'Oriental Coins,’ (1823–5), and many subjects of natural history for the transactions of the Linnean, Zoological, and Entomological societies. There are a few contemporary portraits by him, including one of Marshal Blücher, after Friedrich Rehberg. Swaine contributed engravings to 'The Gentleman's Magazine’ for fifty years, commencing in 1804.

Swaine died in Dean Street, Soho, London, on 25 November 1860. In 1797 he married the daughter of his master, Barak Longmate. She died in October 1822.

Swaine taught engraving to his young nephew, James Fahey, who went on to become a notable landscape painter.

== John Barak Swaine ==
John Barak Swaine (1815?–1838), his only son, studied in the schools of the Royal Academy, and while still a boy did some good antiquarian work. Drawings by him, illustrating papers by Alfred John Kempe, appeared in Archæologia, 1832 and 1834. In 1833 he was awarded the Isis gold medal of the Society of Arts for an etching, and in that year drew, etched, and published a large plate of the east window of St. Margaret's, Westminster. In 1834, having taken up oil painting, he visited The Hague and Paris to study and copy in the galleries there. He walked from Holland to Paris, making many sketches on the way. In Paris he painted much and also tried his hand successfully at wood engraving. He engraved in mezzotint Rembrandt's ‘Spanish Officer,’ also a picture by himself entitled 'The Dutch Governess,’ and a portrait of A. J. Kempe. In 1837 he etched a plate of the altar window at Hampton Lucy in Warwickshire.

Swaine was a versatile artist of great promise, but died young, after a long illness, at the age of 23 in Queen Street, Golden Square, London, on 28 March 1838.
