= Alfred John Kempe =

English antiquary

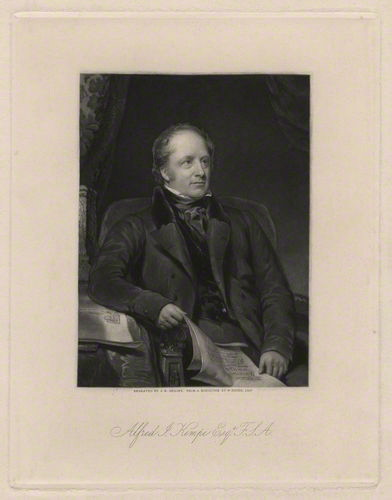
- Alfred John Kempe: mezzotint by John Barak Swaine, after William Patten
- Born: c. 1784; London, England
- Died: August 21, 1846 (aged 61–62); London, England
- Occupation: Antiquary
- Employer(s): Tower Hamlets militia (until 1811), Royal Mint, Gentleman's Magazine
- Relatives: Anna Eliza Bray (sister), Charles Alfred Stothard (brother-in-law)

Alfred John Kempe (c. 1784 – 21 August 1846) was an English antiquary.

== Life ==
Kempe was born in London, and baptised at the church of St Mary, Newington on 16 July 1784. He was the only son of John Kempe, bullion-porter in the Royal Mint, and his wife Anne, youngest daughter of James Arrow of Westminster, who died in 1835. The novelist Anna Eliza Bray was his sister. He was educated by two French refugees, but was not trained for any specific employment.

For about five years Kempe held a commission in the Tower Hamlets militia, but resigned his post in 1811, and lived for a time at Chepstow and Swansea. In the summer of 1813 he moved to the neighbourhood of Holwood Hill in the parish of Keston in Kent. Charles Alfred Stothard, who married his sister, interested him in antiquities and they spent much time exploring the district. Later on Kempe pursued investigations into the ancient remains at Keston with Thomas Crofton Croker. Following Stothard's death in 1821, Kempe helped his sister bring her husband's Monumental Effigies of Great Britain to completion, writing most of the additional text.

For a short time Kempe held an appointment at the Royal Mint, but lost it due to staff cuts. From about 1840 to 1845 employment was found for him at the state paper office, working on transcribing and calendaring, but his health broke down. He died at Stamford Villas, Fulham Road, London, on 21 August 1846 and was buried in Fulham churchyard on 27 August.

== Works ==
Kempe was elected Fellow of the Society of Antiquaries of London in 1828. He contributed to Archaeologia from 1816, and exhibited curiosities at its meetings. From its members he formed the "Society of Noviomagus", which took its name from the Roman city supposed to have been built on Holwood Hill. For many years he was on the staff of the Gentleman's Magazine, and copies of his articles were printed separately between 1830 and 1832. His paper on Tavistock Abbey was later incorporated into his sister's Borders of the Tamar and the Tavy.

Kempe was the author of:

- The Battle of Trafalgar, an Ode (1806).
- "An Investigation of the Antiquities of Holwood Hill", which originally appeared in the Military Register, vol. 1 (1814), and was appended to John Dunkin's Outline of History of Bromley in Kent (1815).
- Introduction and descriptions for The Monumental Effigies of Great Britain, by C. A. Stothard (1817–32).
- Circumstantial Narrative of the Campaign in Saxony, 1813; written in German by Baron von Odeleben, and translated by A. J. Kempe (2 vols, 1820)
- Historical Notices of Collegiate Church of St. Martin-le-Grand, London. With Observations on the different kinds of Sanctuary formerly recognised by the common Law (1825).
- Proceedings at Meeting for Preservation of Lady Chapel at St. Saviour's, Southwark, 28 Jan. 1832. Preface signed A. J. K.
- The Loseley Manuscripts. Preserved in Muniment Room of James More Molyneux at Loseley House, Surrey. Edited, with Notes (1836)
- A Few Words to Tradesmen and Public on the desirableness ... of abridging the Number of Hours of Business,(1842).

== Family ==
On 3 October 1808 he married at Leyton, Essex, Mary, daughter of J. Prior, a captain in the merchant service, who bore him eleven children.
