= Arthur Collins (antiquarian) =

English antiquarian, genealogist, and historian

- Born: 1682
- Died: 1760 (aged 77–78)
- Occupations: Antiquarian; genealogist
- Known for: Peerage of England

Arthur Collins (1682–1760) was an English antiquarian, genealogist, and historian. He is most known for his work Peerage of England.

== Personal life ==
Collins was born in 1682, the son of William Collins, Esq., a Gentleman Usher to Queen Catherine, and Elizabeth Blythe. His father managed to spend his way through his fortune of some £30,000, but despite this he was able to give his son a liberal education, after which Arthur worked for at least some of his life as a bookseller across from St Dunstan's Church on Fleet Street. He married around 1708, and died in 1760, at the age of 78. He was buried in Battersea, then part of Surrey. His son, Major General Arthur Tooker Collins, was the father of David Collins, the first Lieutenant Governor of Tasmania.

== Peerage of England ==
The first two editions of Collins's Peerage were published as single volumes in 1709 and 1712. Subsequent editions included an increasing number of added volumes, such that the fifth edition, published in 1778, contained eight volumes. Barak Longmate, publisher of the fifth edition, also published a supplement to it in 1784. Samuel Egerton Brydges released the nine-volume sixth edition in 1812, bringing all of the book's contents up to date and describing Collins as "a most industrious, faithful, and excellent genealogist" whose only failing was a habit of regarding rank and titles with "too indiscriminate respect and flattery."

== Other works ==
Collins published Cases of Baronies in 1734; a five-volume Baronetage in 1741; Letters &c. of the Sidneys in 1746; Letters and Memorials of State, the letters of the Sidneys' business manager Rowland Whyte; and the noble Families of Cavendish, &c. in 1752. He also published two biographies: Life of Lord Burleigh in 1732 and Life of Edward the Black Prince in 1750.
