= Laarne =

- Municipality
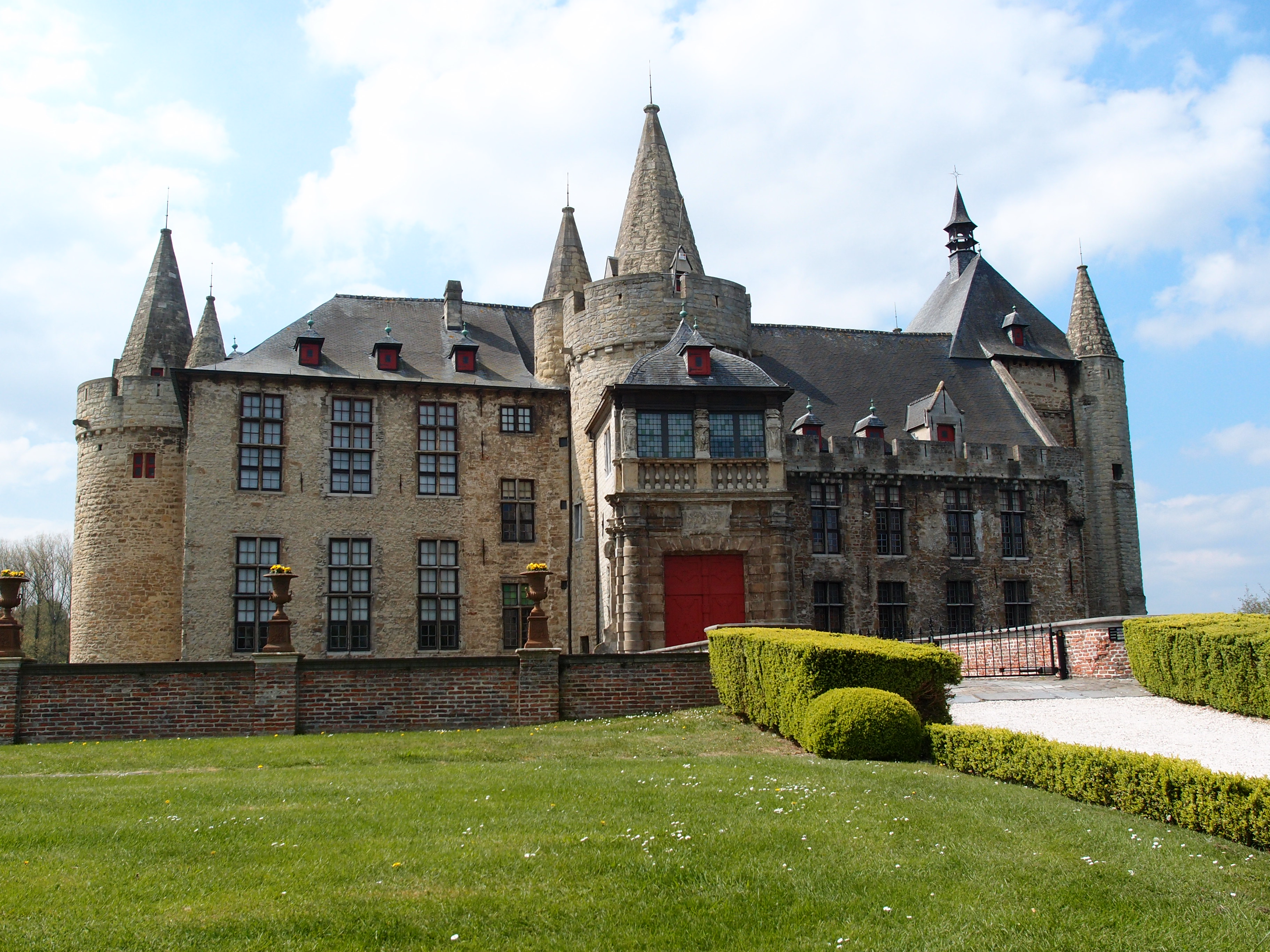
- Castle of Laarne

- Flag Coat of arms

- Location of Laarne in East Flanders
- Interactive map of Laarne
- Location in Belgium
- Coordinates: 51°01′N 03°51′E
- Country: Belgium
- Community: Flemish Community
- Region: Flemish Region
- Province: East Flanders
- Arrondissement: Dendermonde

Government
  - Mayor: Andy De Cock (Team Burgemeester)
  - Governing parties: Team Burgemeester, N-VA

Area
  - Total: 32.58 km^{2} (12.58 sq mi)

Population (2018-01-01)
  - Total: 12,487
  - Density: 383.3/km^{2} (992.7/sq mi)
- Postal codes: 9270
- NIS code: 42010
- Area codes: 09
- Website: www.laarne.be

Laarne (Dutch pronunciation: [ˈlaːrnə]) is a municipality located in the Belgian province of East Flanders. The municipality comprises the towns of Kalken and Laarne proper. On 1 January 2018, Laarne had a total population of 12,487. The total area is 32.07 km^{2}. The current mayor of Laarne is Ignace De Baerdemaecker, from the VLD (Liberal) party.

== History ==
The village lies to the east of Ghent, near a former course of the River the Scheldt and is notable for its castle. The castle dates from the twelfth and later centuries, notably, the seventeenth, and has been sympathetically restored and re-furnished.

The name arises from the Germanic hlaeri which signifies terrain seen as wooded and marshy. It is possible to speculate that the village originated in serving the castle, which in turn, guarded the river approach to Ghent from the sea. In the twelfth century, the river was less remote from the city than it is today. In 1040, Laarne was mentioned as Laren.

The lordship passed by inheritance through the families of Schoutheete, Van Vilsteren and others, finally to the counts of Ribaucourt. The castle is now owned by the Vereniging van Historische Woonsteden van België (the Union of Historic Homesteads of Belgium).

== Gallery ==
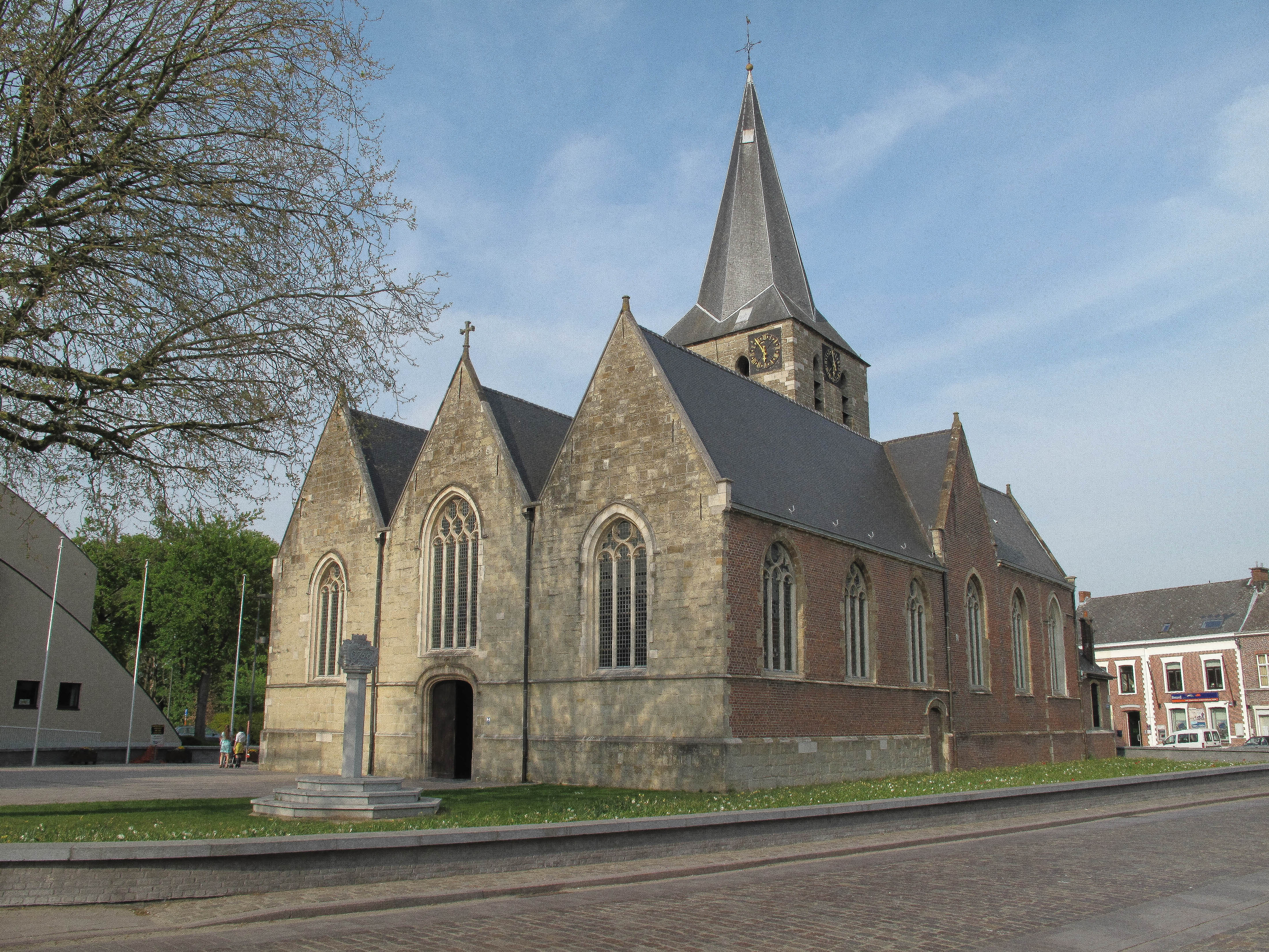
Laarne, Church: Sint-Machariuskerk

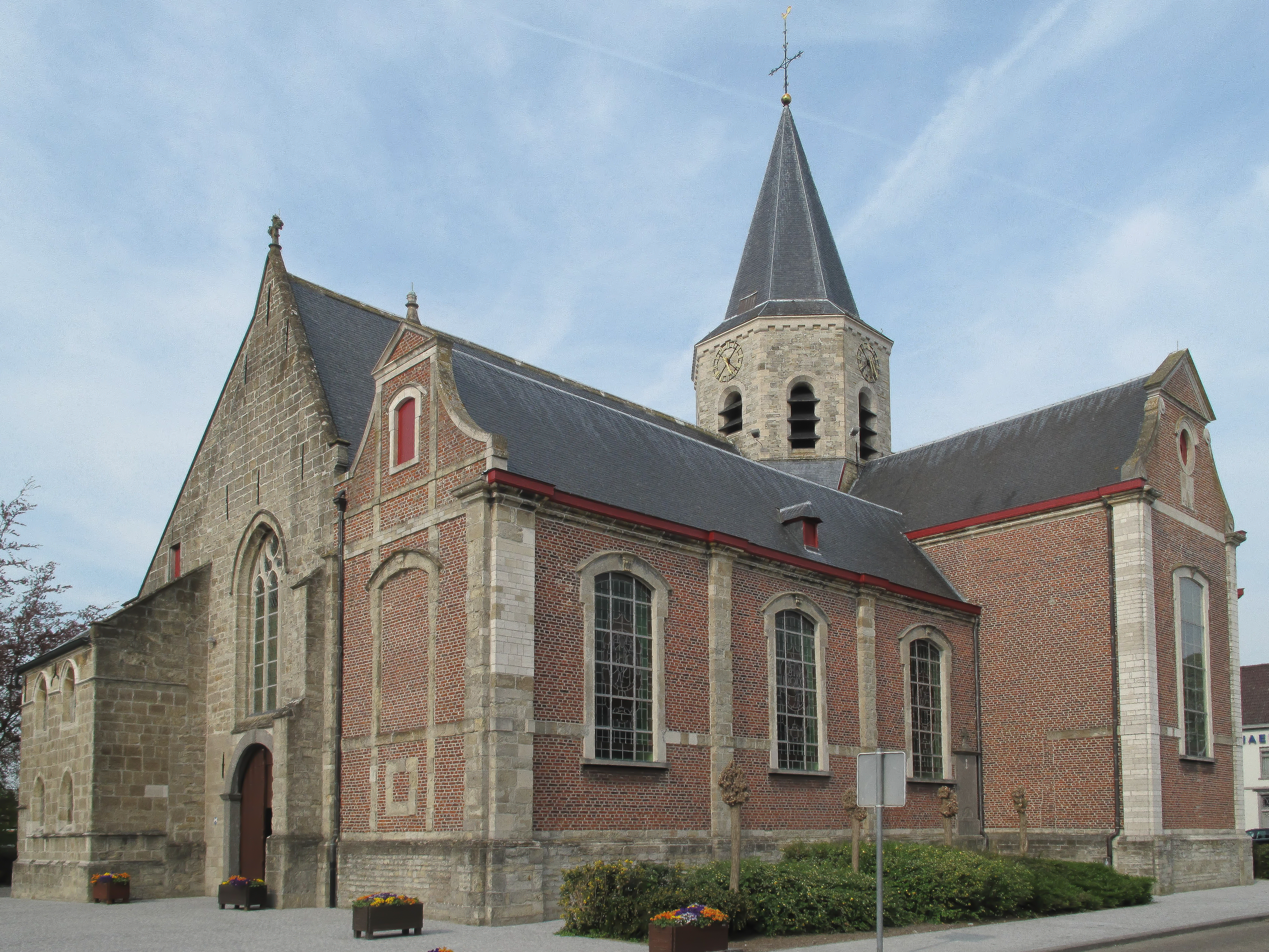
Kalken, church: Sint-Denijskerk

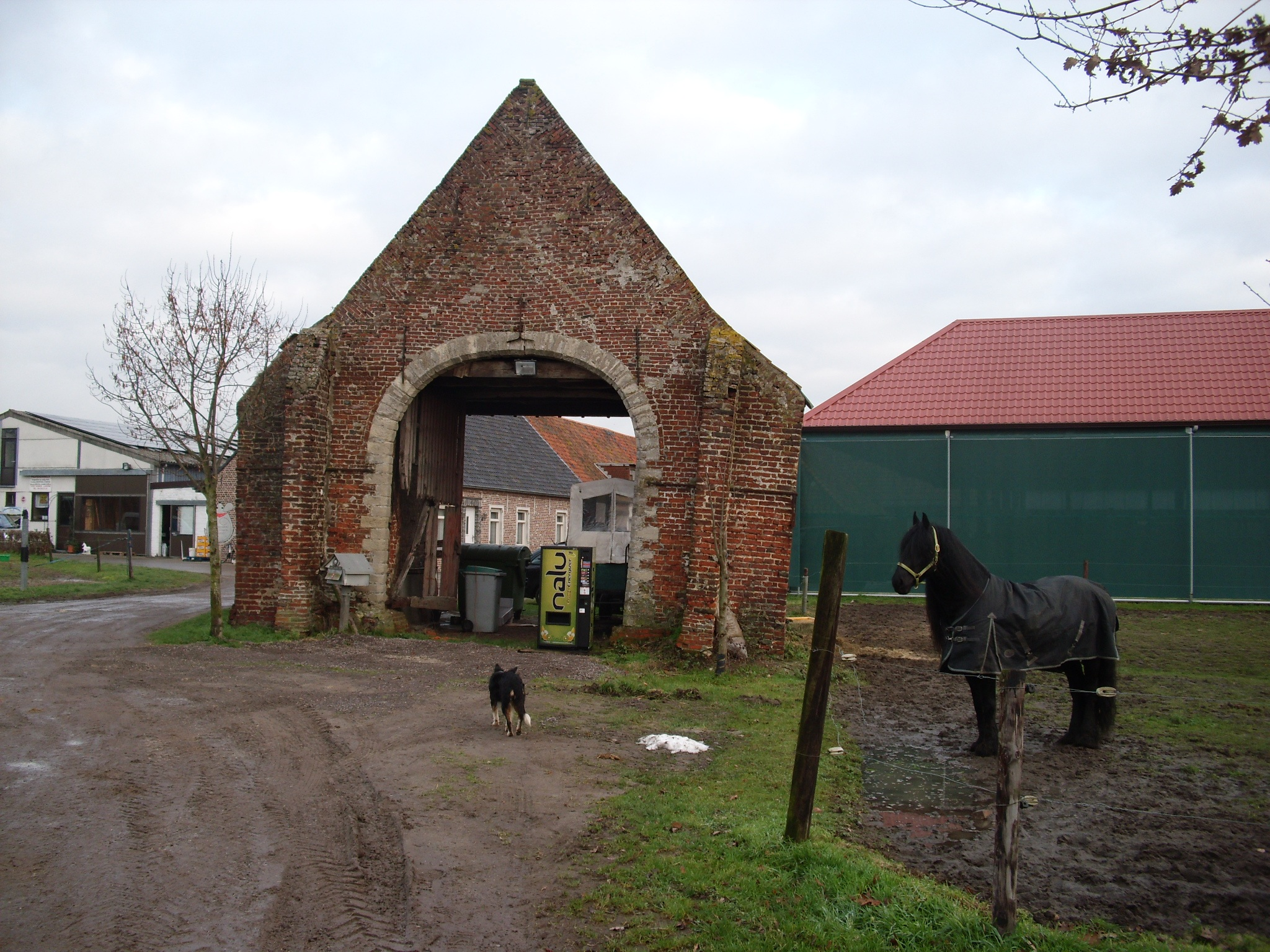
Gate house of ten Cattenaye estate

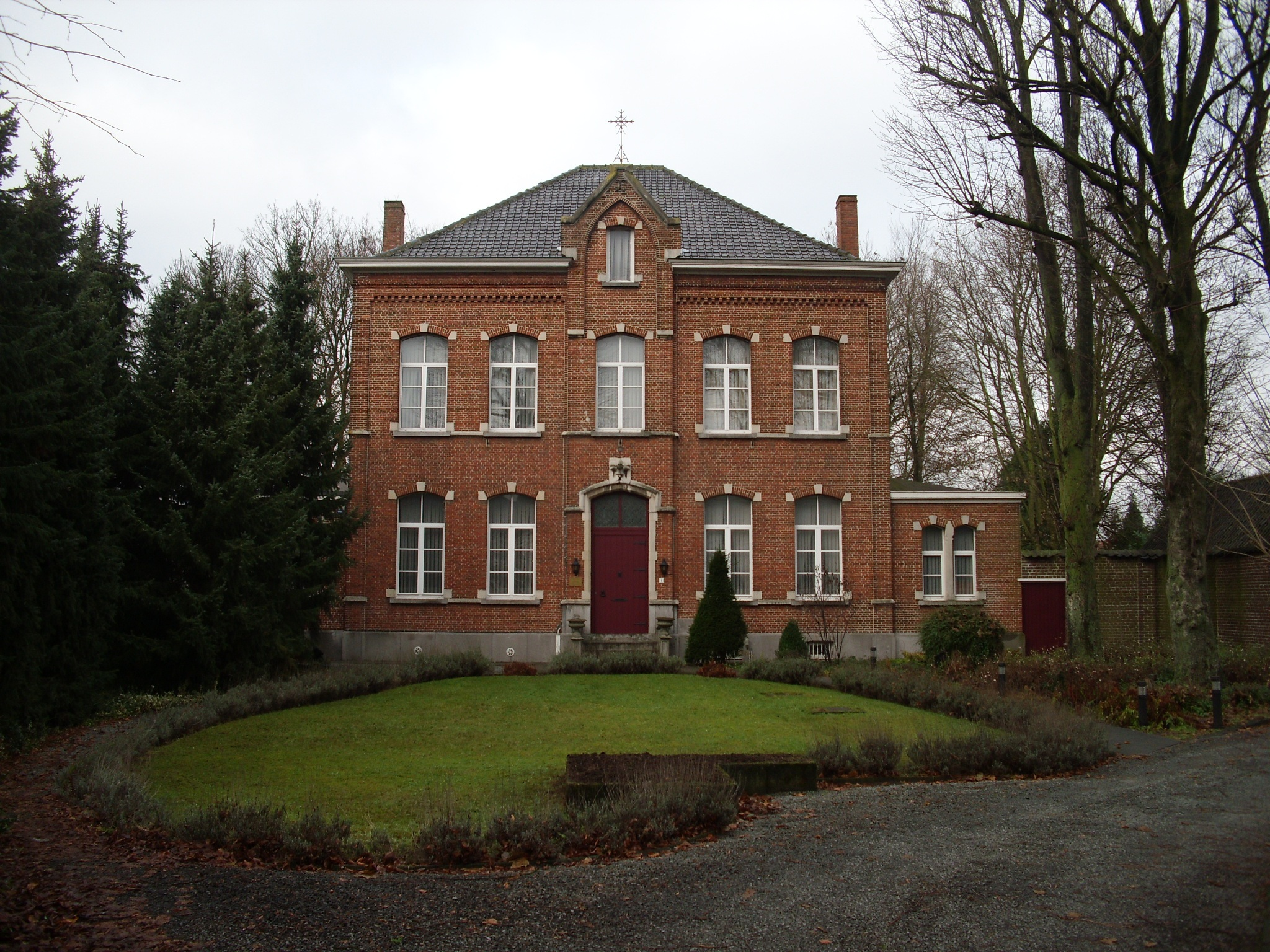
Clergy house in Laarne
