= Barak Longmate =

English genealogist, editor, heraldic engraver and publisher

Barak Longmate (1738 – 23 July 1793) was an English genealogist and editor, heraldic engraver and publisher.

== Life and work ==
Longmate was born in 1738, son of Barak and Elizabeth Longmate of St James's, Westminster in London. He engraved some topographical drawings, but was more distinguished as a heraldic engraver (a branch of bright cut engraving). He died on 23 July 1793 in Noel Street, Soho, and was buried on the 27th of that month in St Marylebone Parish Church's churchyard. He had a son Barak by his wife Elizabeth (d. 1781). His small but valuable library, and a large collection of heraldic manuscripts, were auctioned off at Sotheby's on 10 March 1794, realising just over £235—considered not a great sum. The only known copy of the catalogue is preserved in the British Library.

Longmate published an edition (the fifth) of Collins' Peerage (8 vols. 8vo, London, 1779), and a 'Supplement' in 1784. Of this work he left materials for a new edition. He also edited the 'Pocket Peerage of England, Scotland, and Ireland,' (12mo, London, 1788, new edition, 1790). For Sir Richard Sullivan's Thoughts on the Early Ages of the Irish Nation and History, (4to, 1789), he engraved an elaborate genealogical plate, entitled 'A Genealogical History of the Family of O'Sullivan More from Duach Donn, monarch of Ireland. Anno Mundi 912.' which he regarded as his masterpiece (Martin, 'Cat. of Privately Printed Books', p. 105).

William Sharp (1749–1824) and John Swaine (1775–1860) were both pupils of Longmate.

== Barak Longmate the younger ==
His son, Barak Longmate (1768–1836), born in 1768, succeeded his father in his profession and as editor of the Pocket Peerage, of which he issued an edition in two duodecimo volumes in 1813; but the increased success of Debrett's Peerage badly affected sales. He was a good draughtsman, and well skilled in heraldry, and was of much assistance to John Nichols and other antiquarians in their topographical labours.

About 1801 he made notes respecting the churches in many Gloucestershire parishes, with the view of publishing a continuation of Ralph Bigland's History of that county. Owing, however, to the fire at Nichols' printing-office in 1808, the work was abandoned, and the manuscript was deposited, instead, among the collections of Sir Thomas Phillipps at Middle Hill, Broadway, Worcestershire. Longmate the younger died on 25 February 1836.
