= The White Hoods =

Historical novel by Anna Eliza Bray

The White Hoods: an Historical Romance
- Author: Anna Eliza Bray
- Language: English
- Publication date: 1828

The White Hoods: an Historical Romance is a historical novel by Anna Eliza Bray, first published in 1828 in London.
