= James Fahey (painter) =

English painter

James Fahey (16 April 1804 – 11 December 1885) was an English landscape painter.

== Life and work ==
Fahey was born at Paddington, then a village near London, and at first studied engraving under his uncle, John Swaine. Afterwards he became a pupil of George Scharf, and then went to Paris, where he studied from life, making full-size drawings of dissections, which he reproduced on stone for the use of anatomical students. His earliest exhibited work, a "Portrait of a young Gentleman", appeared at the Royal Academy in 1825, and was followed in 1827 by drawings of the church of St. Jacques at Dieppe and the cathedral of Notre-Dame at Paris. Between this time and 1836 he contributed several portraits and landscapes in water-colours to the exhibitions of the Royal Academy, the British Institution, and the Society of British Artists.

Meanwhile, the beauties of English scenery led him by degrees to devote himself exclusively to landscape painting, and in 1834 he joined the Associated Painters in Water-Colours, out of which was formed in 1835 the New Society of Painters in Water-Colours (now the Royal Institute of Painters in Water-Colours). Its first three exhibitions were held in Exeter Hall, London, until in 1838 it moved to Pall Mall, when Fahey became its secretary. This office he held until 1874, and discharged its duties with much tact and devotion. His works, mostly landscape compositions, in which he introduced figures and groups, were seldom absent from its exhibitions, and his official services were long given without any remuneration. In 1853, 1855, and 1857 he again sent landscape drawings to the Royal Academy, and in 1856 he was appointed drawing-master at the Merchant Taylors' School, from which post he retired with a pension after twenty-seven years' service. He also painted occasionally in oil, and exhibited two pictures at the British Institution in 1861 and 1862.

Fahey died at The Grange, Shepherd's Bush Green, London. His son, Edward Henry Fahey (1844–1907), was well known as a painter in water-colours.
