= John Hodges Benwell =

English painter

John Hodges Benwell (1764–1785) was an English genre painter, some of whose works became well known through engravings.

== Life ==
Benwell was born at Blenheim Palace in Oxfordshire where his father was under-steward to George Spencer, 4th Duke of Marlborough. He was a pupil of an obscure portrait painter called Sanders, who lived in Great Russell Street in Bloomsbury, London, but also studied at the Royal Academy Schools, where he was awarded a silver medal in 1782. He later taught drawing at Bath, and executed a few small oval drawings in a technique which combined watercolour and pastel. His works have suffered much from the ravages of time.

He returned to London and exhibited a classical subject, Glycaera at the Tomb of her Mother, at the Royal Academy in 1784, but died of tuberculosis the next year, and was buried in Old St. Pancras churchyard.

Several of his works became well known from engravings. They included two scenes from "Auld Robin Gray"; the "Children in the Wood", engraved by William Sharp; and A St. Giles's Beauty and A St. James's Beauty, both engraved by Bartolozzi.
