= St Andrew's Church, Bere Ferrers =

Coordinates: 50°27′01″N 4°10′17″W

Church of St Andrew
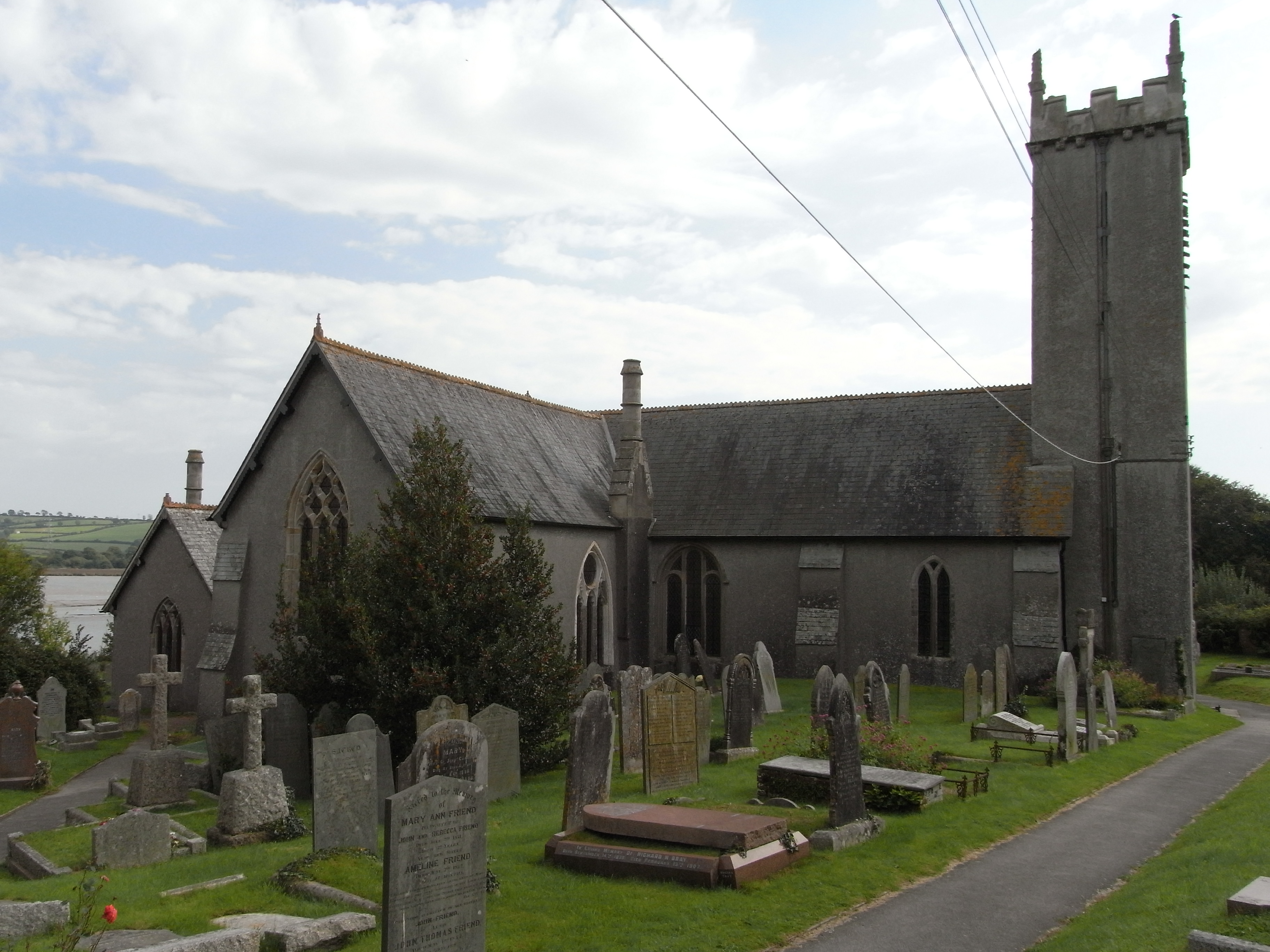
- Church of St Andrew, viewed from the north-west
- Church of St Andrew
- Location: Bere Ferrers
- Denomination: Church of England
- Website: https://www.bereanglicans.org.uk/

History
- Founded: 1333
- Dedication: Andrew the Apostle
- Consecrated: 1333

Architecture
- Years built: 1290-1340

Administration
- Province: Province of Canterbury
- Diocese: Diocese of Exeter
- Parish: Bere Ferrers

Clergy
- Vicar: Revd Nick Law

St Andrew's Church in Bere Ferrers, Devon, is a parish church in the Church of England The church contains the oldest stained-glass window in Devon (excluding Exeter Cathedral), dated at 600 years old. The building was probably built at various times between 1290 and 1340; it is recorded that an archpresbytery was founded here in 1333 and the north transept appears to be the earliest part of the church while the south aisle is the latest, perhaps 15th century.

== History and architecture ==
Features of interest include the Norman font, an unusual altar stone, benches having benchends carved with traceried arches, and an early medieval monument to a knight and lady (probably of the Ferrers family, Latinised as Ferrariis: dative plural). In the church are two other monuments: another recess with effigy of a knight, and a tomb chest of the 1520s, perhaps for Robert Willoughby, 2nd Baron Willoughby de Broke (d. 1521/2). In 1821 the antiquarian draughtsman Charles Alfred Stothard was killed on falling while making a tracing from a window of the church: his tombstone is in the churchyard.

== Heraldry ==
=== Heraldic bench ends ===
The church contains late 15th-century oak pews with ornately carved bench ends. Two of these are of especially fine work and interest as they are carved with heraldic escutcheons of the Ferrers and Willoughby families. Each is at the outer end of the central row of pews closest to the chancel. That on the north side shows a bend charged with four horseshoes (fer-de-cheval), being the canting arms of Ferrers, overlaid by three ship's rudders in bend sinister, the badge of the Willoughby family, inherited from Cheyne, as evidenced by an appearance on the earlier Cheyne tomb at Edington Priory in Wiltshire.

Further rudders are shown in the field, one in base, one in sinister. That on the south side shows the arms of Willoughby de Broke, quartered as on the tomb of Robert Willoughby, 1st Baron Willoughby de Broke (d.1502) at Callington, Cornwall, with some details omitted in the wood-carving. The full blazon is: Quarterly, 1st grand quarter quarterly, 1st and 4th a cross crosslet double crossed 2nd and 3rd a cross moline; (Willoughby) 2nd grand quarter, a cross fleurie (Latimer) 3rd grand quarter, 4 fusils in fess each charged with an escallop (Cheyne) 4th grand quarter, a chevron within a bordure engrailled (Stafford).

=== Heraldic roof-bosses ===
The junctions of the oak beams of the ceiling of the south porch are embellished with several oak bosses, some of which display carved armorials of the ancestral families of Willoughby, as shown within the bench-end escutcheons, namely Ferrers, Latimer and Cheyne. Also shown here are the arms of the Gorges family of Knighton, Isle of Wight and Wraxall, Somerset, from a co-heiress from whom the Cheyneys were descended, blazoned as Argent, a gurges azure. A gurges is a form of canting arms, being Latin for a whirlpool, depicted as a whorl.

== Gallery ==
Heraldic Oak bench ends, late 15th century, St Andrew's Church, Bere Ferrers. 19th-century drawing by Roscoe Gibbs

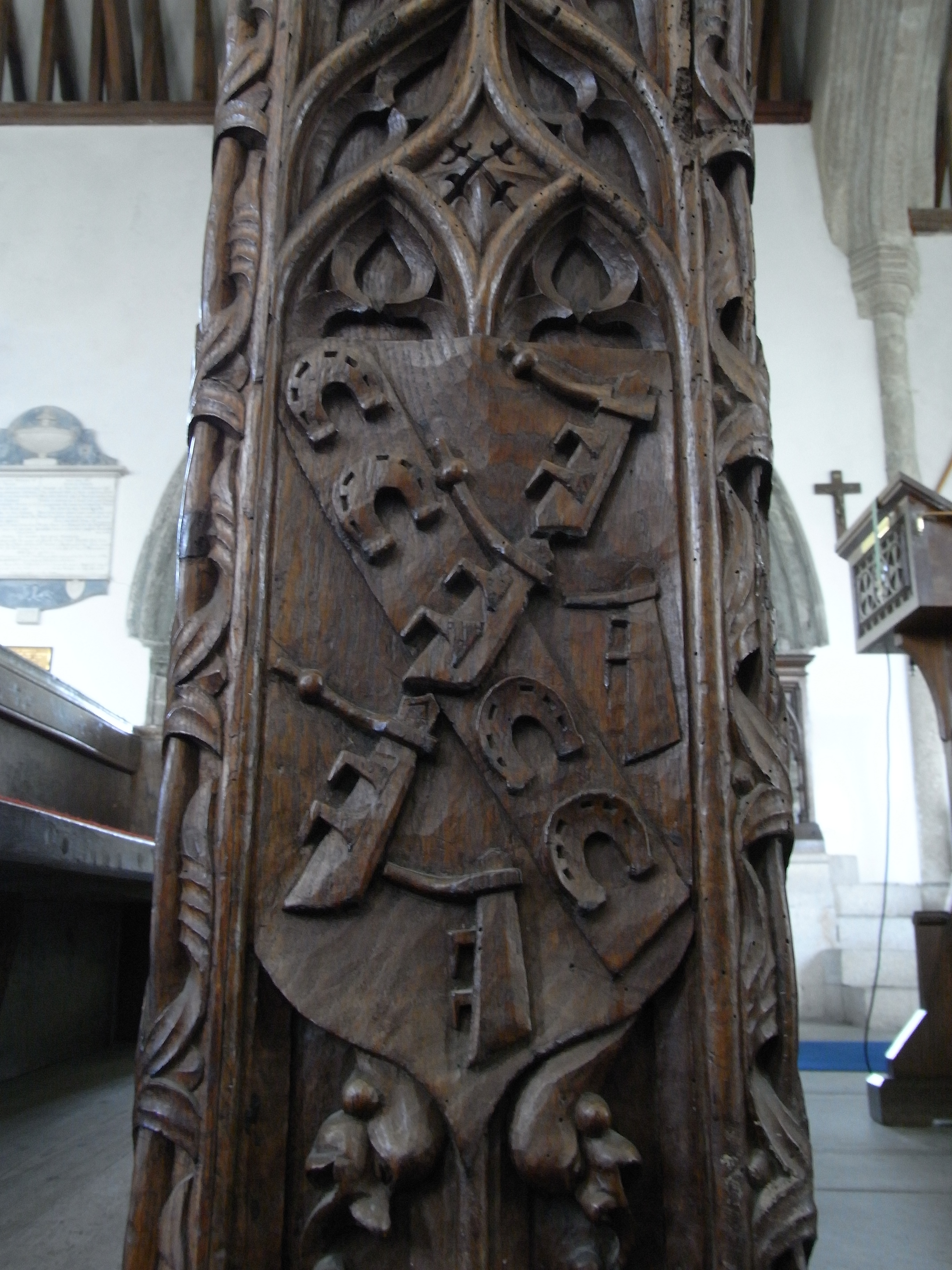
Heraldic bench ends, Bere Ferrers

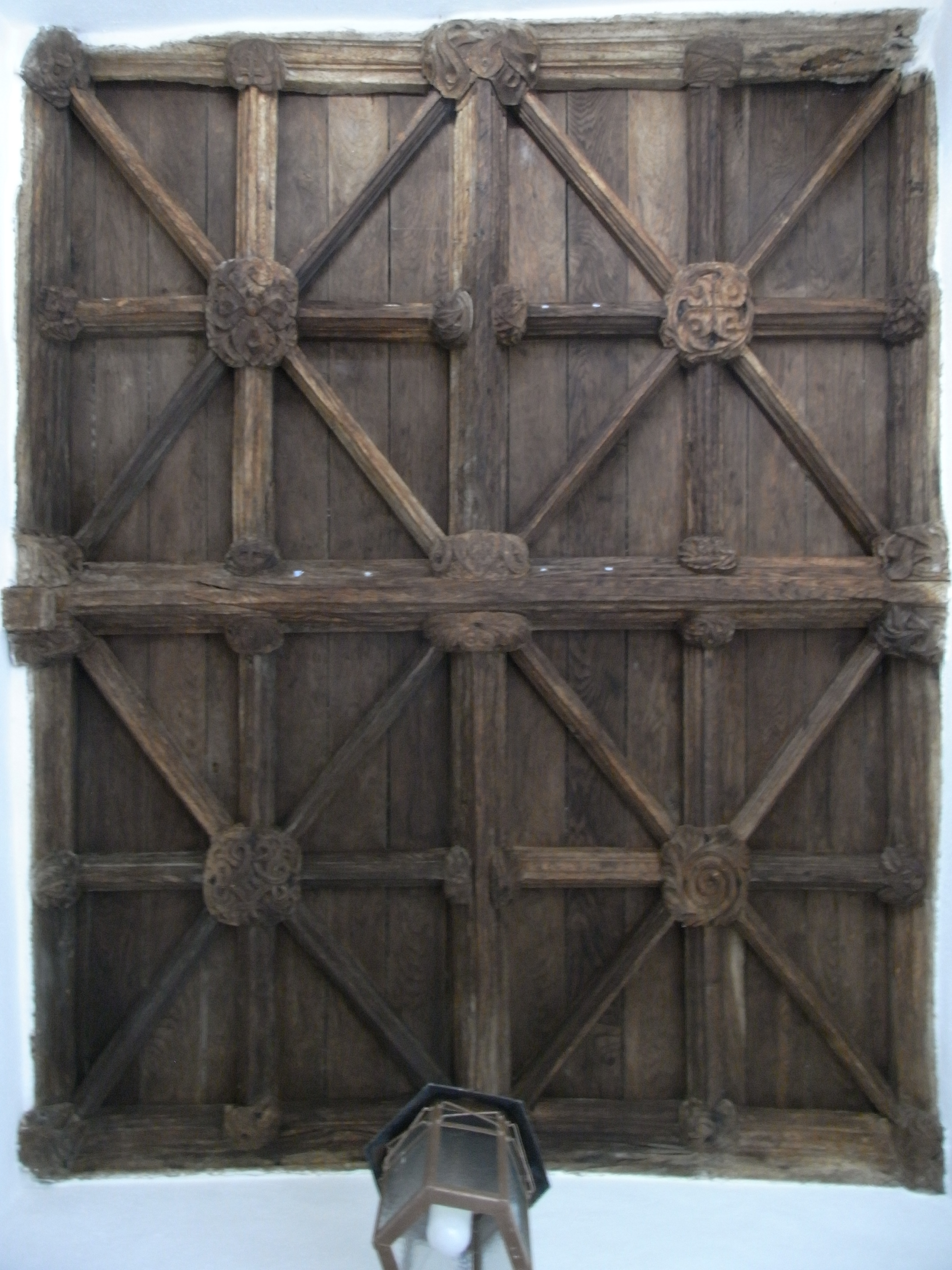
Roof of south porch, St Andrew's Church. The lantern hangs at the northern end before the church door
