= Thomas Stothard =

English painter

Thomas Stothard RA (17 August 1755 – 27 April 1834) was a British painter, illustrator and engraver. His son, Robert T. Stothard was a painter (fl. 1810): he painted the proclamation outside York Minster of Queen Victoria's accession to the throne in June 1837.

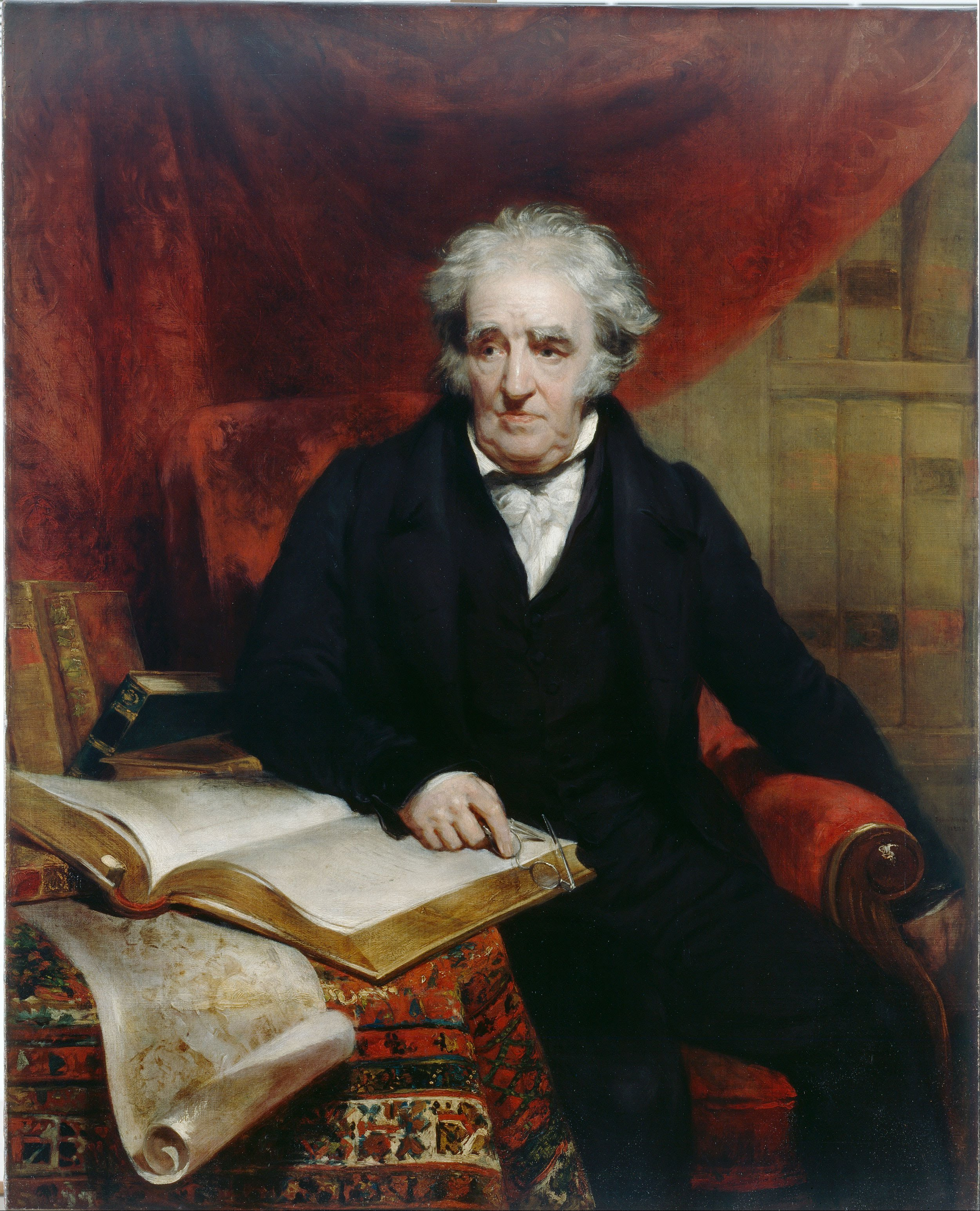
Portrait of Thomas Stothard by John Wood (1833)

== Early life ==
Stothard was born in London, the son of a well-to-do innkeeper in Long Acre. A delicate child, he was sent at the age of five to a relative in Yorkshire, and attended school at Acomb, and afterwards at Tadcaster and at Ilford, Essex. Showing talent for drawing, he was apprenticed to a draughtsman of patterns for brocaded silks in Spitalfields. In his spare time, he attempted illustrations for the works of his favourite poets. Some of these drawings were praised by James Harrison, the editor of the Novelist's Magazine. Stothard's master having died, he resolved to devote himself to art.

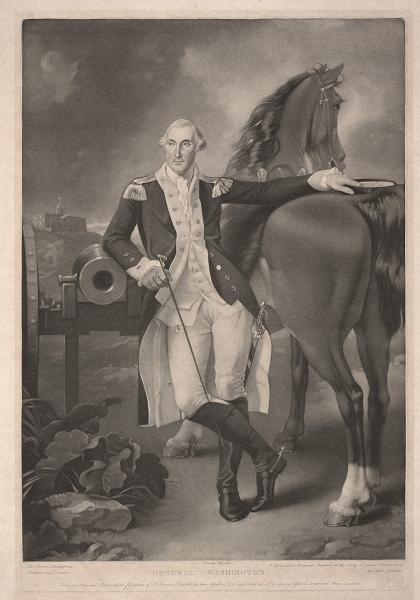
General Washington, Dallas Museum of Art

== Career ==
In 1778 Stothard became a student of the Royal Academy, of which he was elected associate in 1792 and full academician in 1794. In 1812 he was appointed librarian to the Academy after serving as assistant for two years. Among his earliest book illustrations are plates engraved for Ossian and for Bell's Poets. In 1780, he became a regular contributor to the Novelist's Magazine, for which he produced 148 designs, including his eleven illustrations to The Adventures of Peregrine Pickle (by Tobias Smollett) and his graceful subjects from Clarissa and The History of Sir Charles Grandison (both by Samuel Richardson).

From 1786, Thomas Fielding, a friend of Stothard's and engraver, produced engravings using designs by Stothard, Angelika Kauffmann, and of his own. Arcadian scenes were especially esteemed. Fielding realised these in colour, using copper engraving, and achieved excellent quality. Stothard's designs had an exceptional aesthetic appeal.

He designed plates for pocket-books, tickets for concerts, illustrations to almanacs, and portraits of popular actors. These are popular with collectors for their grace and distinction. His more important works include illustrations for:

- Two sets for Daniel Defoe's Robinson Crusoe, one for the New Magazine and one for Stockdale's edition
- John Bunyan's The Pilgrim's Progress (1788)
- Harding's edition of Oliver Goldsmith's The Vicar of Wakefield (1792)
- Alexander Pope's The Rape of the Lock (1798)
- The works of the Swiss poet Salomon Gessner (1802)
- William Cowper's Poems (1825)
- Giovanni Boccaccio's The Decameron

His figure-subjects in Samuel Rogers's Italy (1830) and Poems (1834) demonstrate that even in old age, his imagination remained fertile and his hand firm.

Art historian Ralph Nicholson Wornum estimated that Stothard's designs number five thousand and, of these, about three thousand were engraved. His oil pictures are usually small. His colouring is often rich and glowing in the style of Rubens, whom Stothard admired. The Vintage, perhaps his most important oil painting, is in the National Gallery. He contributed to John Boydell's Shakespeare Gallery, but his best-known painting is the Procession of the Canterbury Pilgrims, in Tate Britain, the engraving from which, begun by Luigi and continued by Niccolo Schiavonetti and finished by James Heath, was immensely popular. The commission for this picture was given to Stothard by Robert Hartley Cromek, and was the cause of a quarrel with his friend William Blake. It was followed by a companion work, the Flitch of Bacon, which was drawn in sepia for the engraver but was never carried out in colour.

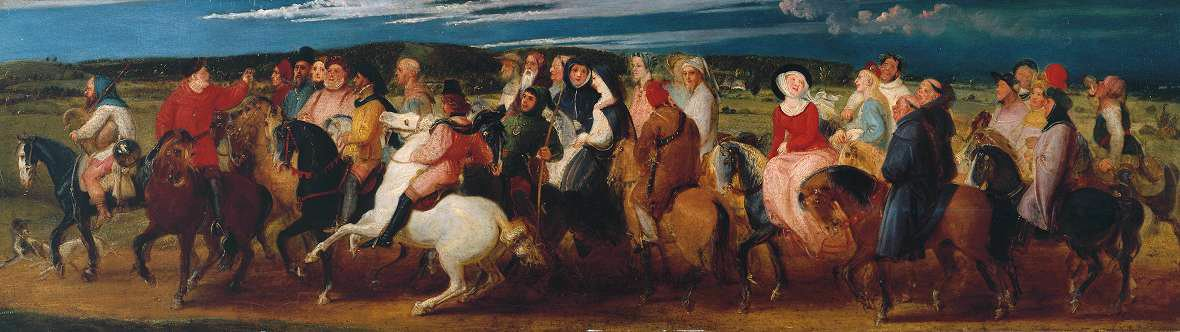
Thomas Stothard, The Pilgrimage to Canterbury (1806–07, Tate Britain)

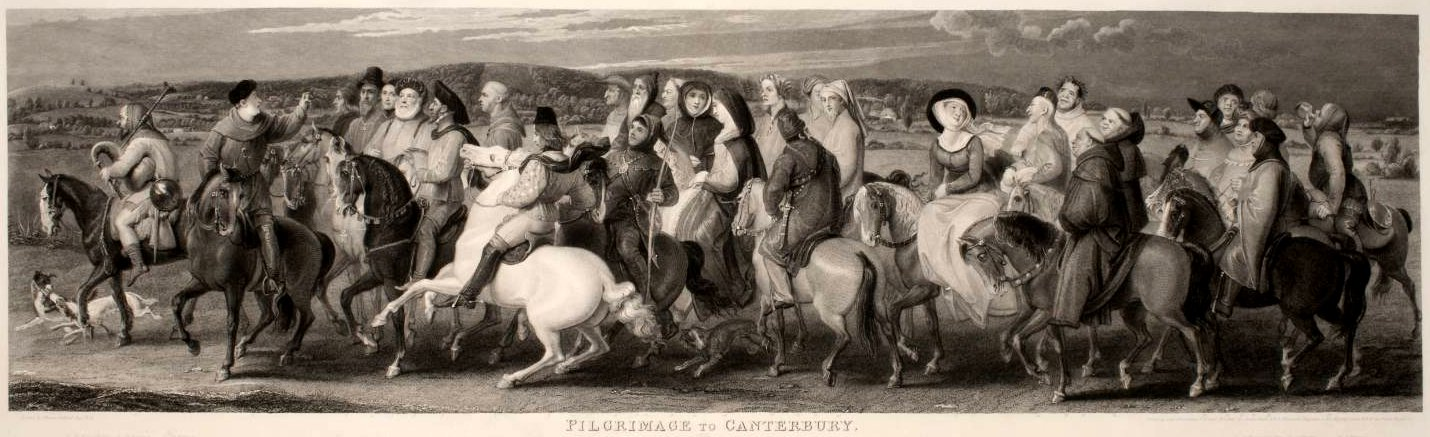
After Thomas Stothard, The Pilgrimage to Canterbury, engraved by Luigi Schiavonetti & James Heath (1809–17, Tate Britain)

In addition to his easel pictures, Stothard decorated the grand staircase of Burghley House, near Stamford in Lincolnshire, with subjects of War, Intemperance, and the Descent of Orpheus in Hell (1799–1803); the library of Colonel Johnes' mansion of Hafod, in North Wales, with a series of scenes from Froissart and Monstrelet painted in imitation of relief (1810); and the cupola of the upper hall of the Advocates' Library, Edinburgh (later occupied by the Signet Library), with Apollo and the Muses, and figures of poets, orators, etc. (1822). He prepared designs for a frieze and other sculptural decorations for Buckingham Palace, which were not executed, owing to the death of George IV. He also designed a shield presented to the Duke of Wellington by the merchants of London, and executed a series of eight etchings from the various subjects that adorned it.

== Personal life ==
Stothard married Rebecca Watkins (d. 1825) in 1783. They had eleven children, of whom six – five sons and one daughter – survived infancy. They lived in Henrietta Street, Covent Garden, until 1794, when they moved to a house at 28 Newman Street, Fitzrovia of which Stothard had bought the freehold. His wife died in 1825. His sons included Thomas, accidentally shot dead in about 1801; the antiquarian illustrator Charles Alfred Stothard, who also predeceased his father; and Alfred Joseph Stothard, medallist to George IV.

Stothard died on 27 April 1834, and was buried in Bunhill Fields burial ground in north London.

== In literature ==
Stothard's painting of Erato (one of the Muses) is given a poetical illustration by Letitia Elizabeth Landon in her "Poetical Catalogue of Pictures", in the Literary Gazette (1823). Another of his paintings, The Fairy Queen Sleeping, is poetically examined in a similar fashion in her "Poetical Sketches of Modern Pictures" in The Troubadour (1826).
