= Crediton railway station =

Railway station in Devon, England

Crediton
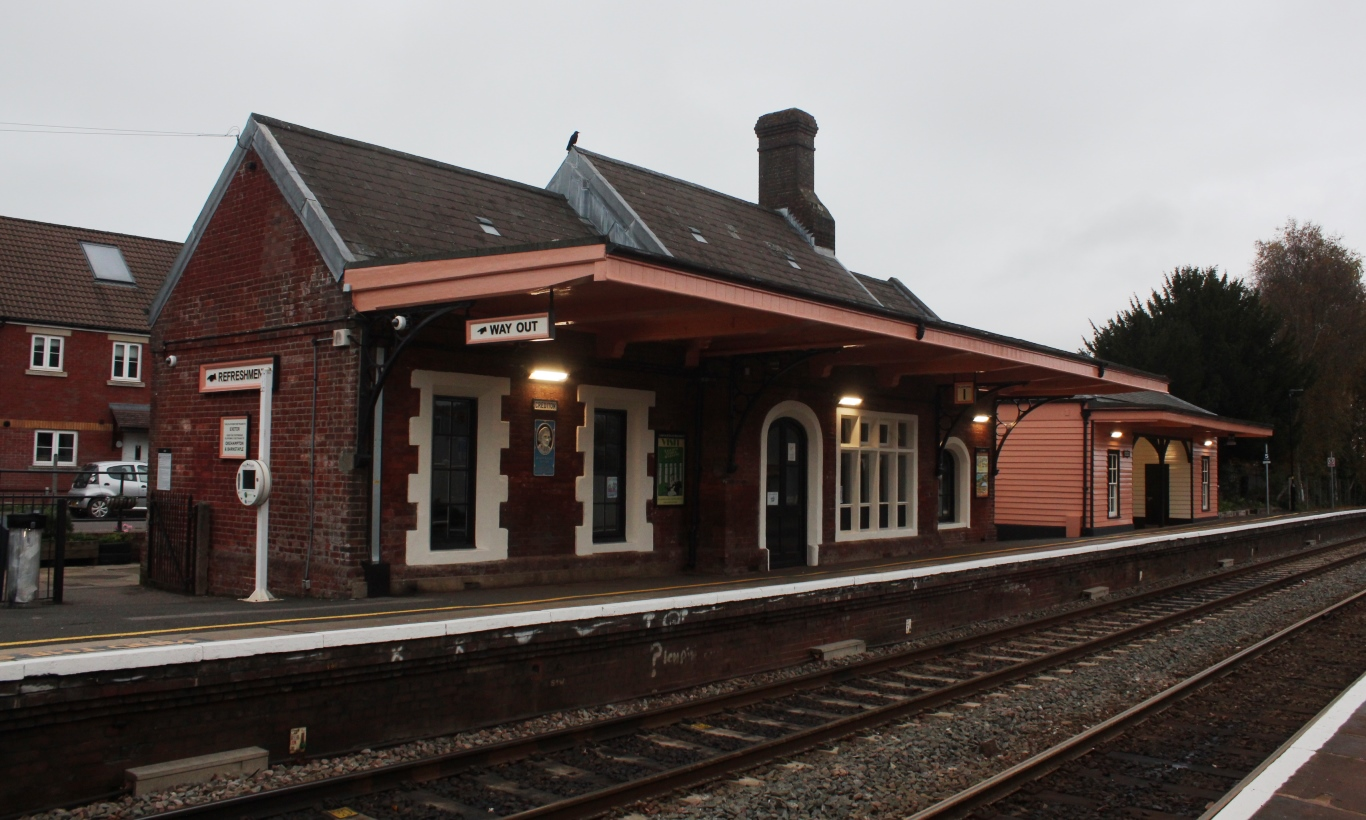

General information
- Location: Crediton, Mid Devon; England
- Coordinates: 50.78318°N 3.64707°W
- Grid reference: SX840994
- Managed by: Great Western Railway
- Platforms: 2

Other information
- Station code: CDI
- Classification: DfT category F1

History
- Original company: Exeter and Crediton Railway
- Pre-grouping: London and South Western Railway
- Post-grouping: Southern Railway

Key dates
- Opened: 12 May 1851

Passengers
- 2020/21: ▼26,306
- 2021/22: ▲84,502
- 2022/23: ▲0.133 million
- 2023/24: ▲0.162 million
- 2024/25: ▲0.187 million

Listed Building – Grade II
- Feature: Crediton Railway Station Main Range
- Designated: 24 August 1989
- Reference no.: 1197092
Location
Notes
- Passenger statistics from the Office of Rail and Road

Crediton railway station is a railway station serving the town of Crediton in Devon, England. It is 7 miles 76 chains (12.8 km) from Exeter Central at milepost 179.25 from London Waterloo.

It is the junction of the Tarka and Dartmoor lines, though the two lines run parallel until Coleford Junction (where the junction of the Barnstaple and Okehampton lines used to be) at Penstone near Coleford (west of Yeoford).

== History ==
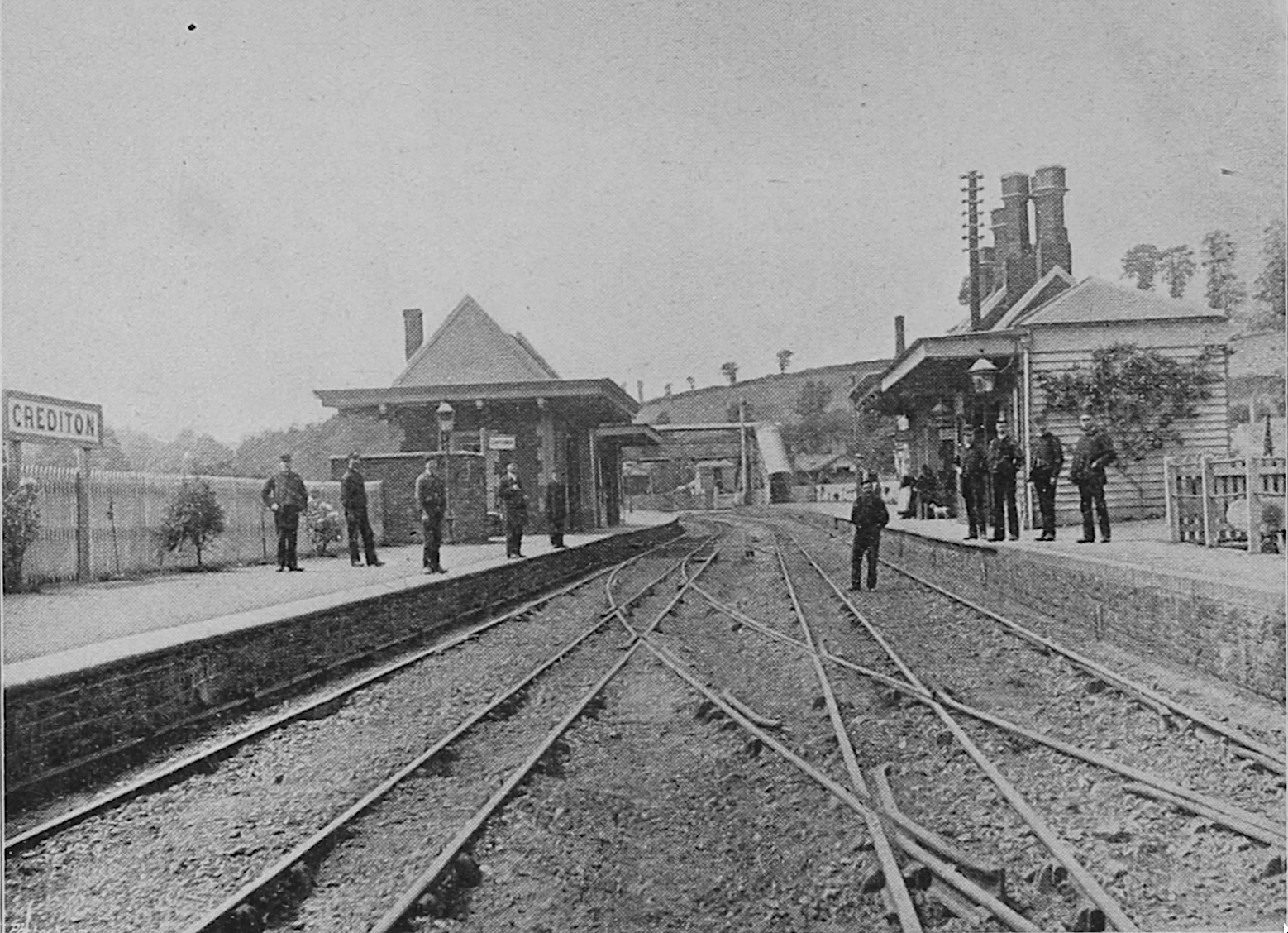
Mixed gauge track used 1862-1892

The Exeter and Crediton Railway was ready to be opened in 1847 but a dispute over the track gauge prevented its opening until 12 May 1851. The 7 ft (2,134 mm) gauge trains were operated by the Bristol and Exeter Railway (B&ER). The line to Barnstaple was then opened by the North Devon Railway on 1 August 1854. Both these railway companies were largely funded by the London and South Western Railway (LSWR) who took control of them in 1855 and 1879 respectively. The LSWR laid additional rails to allow their 4 ft 8 1/2 in (1,435 mm) gauge trains to reach Crediton in 1862 and Barnstaple in 1863, although the B&ER (and later, the Great Western Railway) continued to run freight trains on the broad gauge. From 1 November 1865 LSWR trains ran through Crediton to Okehampton, and from 17 May 1876 on to Plymouth.

The main goods yard was situated on the north side of the line at the Exeter end of the station with road access from the main station approach. One long siding ran through a goods shed for general traffic nd another long siding served various short sidings which handled, among other traffic, livestock and coal. Another siding west of the level crossing was used by Copp & Company. The creamery and dairy in Crediton is located next to the church, but the company's transport depot was located in Hoskin's Yard next to the station. The milk was brought to the station in a lorry and pumped into a milk tank wagon then taken to London in a train with other milk tanks from the larger creamery at Lapford railway station.

Passenger staff were withdrawn from the station in the mid-1960s and the goods yard closed on 4 December 1967. The route to Plymouth had been closed from 6 May 1968 although a service from Exeter to Okehampton continued to operate until 3 June 1972 after which the line only carried traffic from the quarry at Meldon. Since 17 October 1971 the two tracks west of Crediton operated as two single lines, the former down line serving Okehampton and the former up line trains on the Barnstaple route. From 17 December 1984 the line east of Crediton was also singled with trains to and from Exeter using a single track between Crediton and Cowley Bridge Junction. Passenger services to Okehampton resumed on 20 November 2021, initially once every two hours but an hourly service was operated from 15 May 2022.

== Description ==
Crediton railway station is situated about 0.5 miles (0.80 km) south of Crediton near the settlement of Fordton. It has two platforms and includes four Grade II listed buildings and a Grade II listed footbridge which date from 1847 to 1878. The main building on the up (to Exeter) platform was built in 1847 and is constructed in Flemish-bonded red brick with Bath stone dressings and a gabled slate roof. It has been claimed to be an Isambard Kingdom Brunel design however the engineer for the Exeter and Crediton Railway was Robert Dymond and this would have been his responsibility. The timber waiting rooms on both platforms might date from 1862 as they are of London and South Western Railway design. A smaller 1847 brick building used to be on the down platform to the east of the current waiting room but has been demolished.

A plate girder footbridge links the two platforms and was erected in 1878. It has stone piers supporting four sets of wooden steps. The wide bridge has railings down the centre which allowed people on one side to cross between platforms, and on the other side to cross the line when the level crossing gates were closed across the road. The signal box on the north side of the line beyond the level crossing dates from 1875 (although the listed building records suggests 1862)

== Services ==
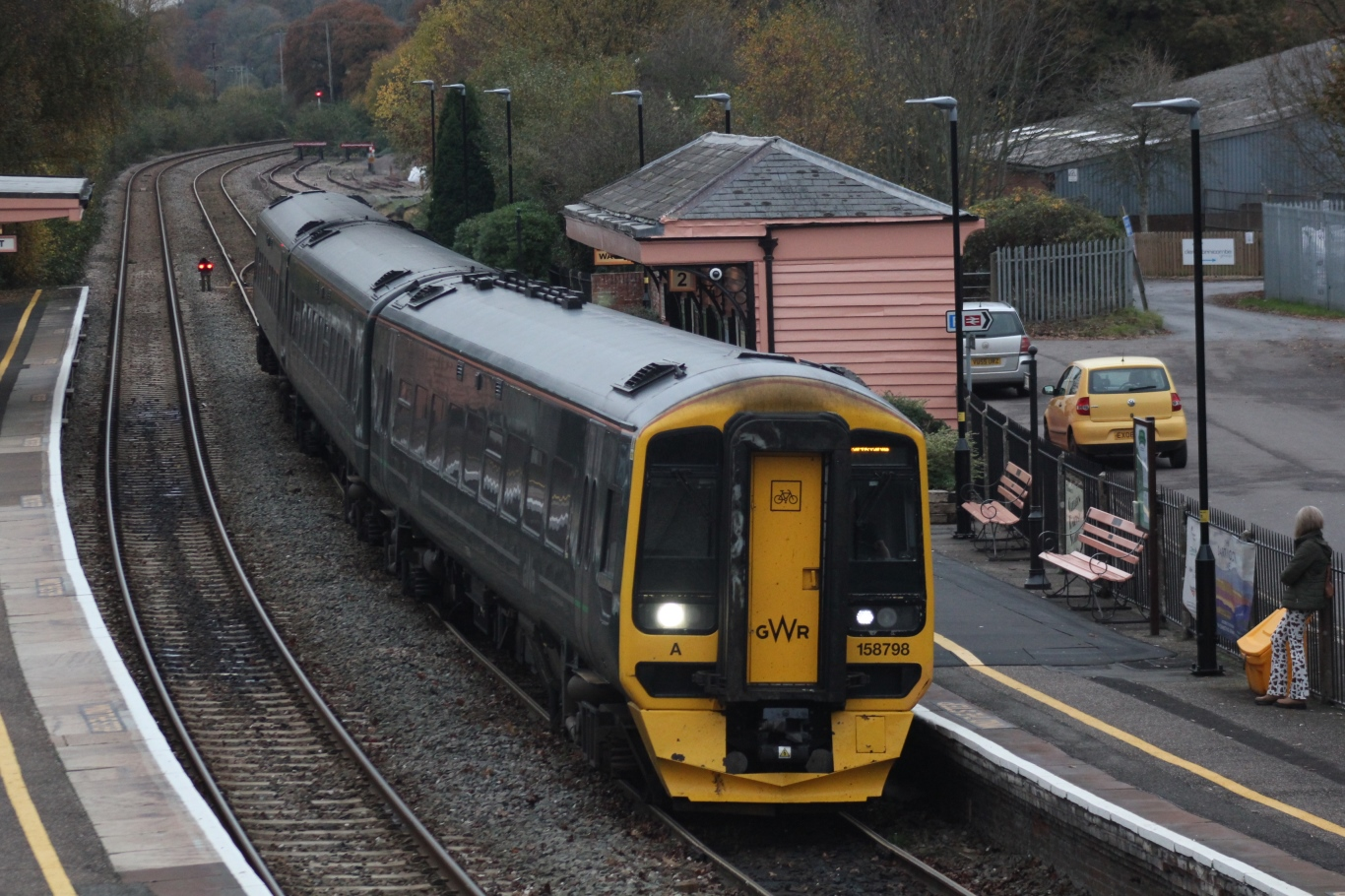
A Tarka Line service to Barnstaple

All services at Crediton are operated by Great Western Railway. There is generally one train per hour in each direction between Okehampton and Exeter Central, and a second train per hour between Barnstaple and Exeter Central but a very small number of services continue to or from other routes in East Devon on weekdays.

Preceding station	National Rail	Following station
Okehampton Interchange towards Okehampton	Great Western Railway Dartmoor Line	Newton St Cyres towards Exeter Central
Yeoford towards Barnstaple	Great Western Railway Tarka Line	Newton St Cyres towards Exeter Central

== Signalling ==
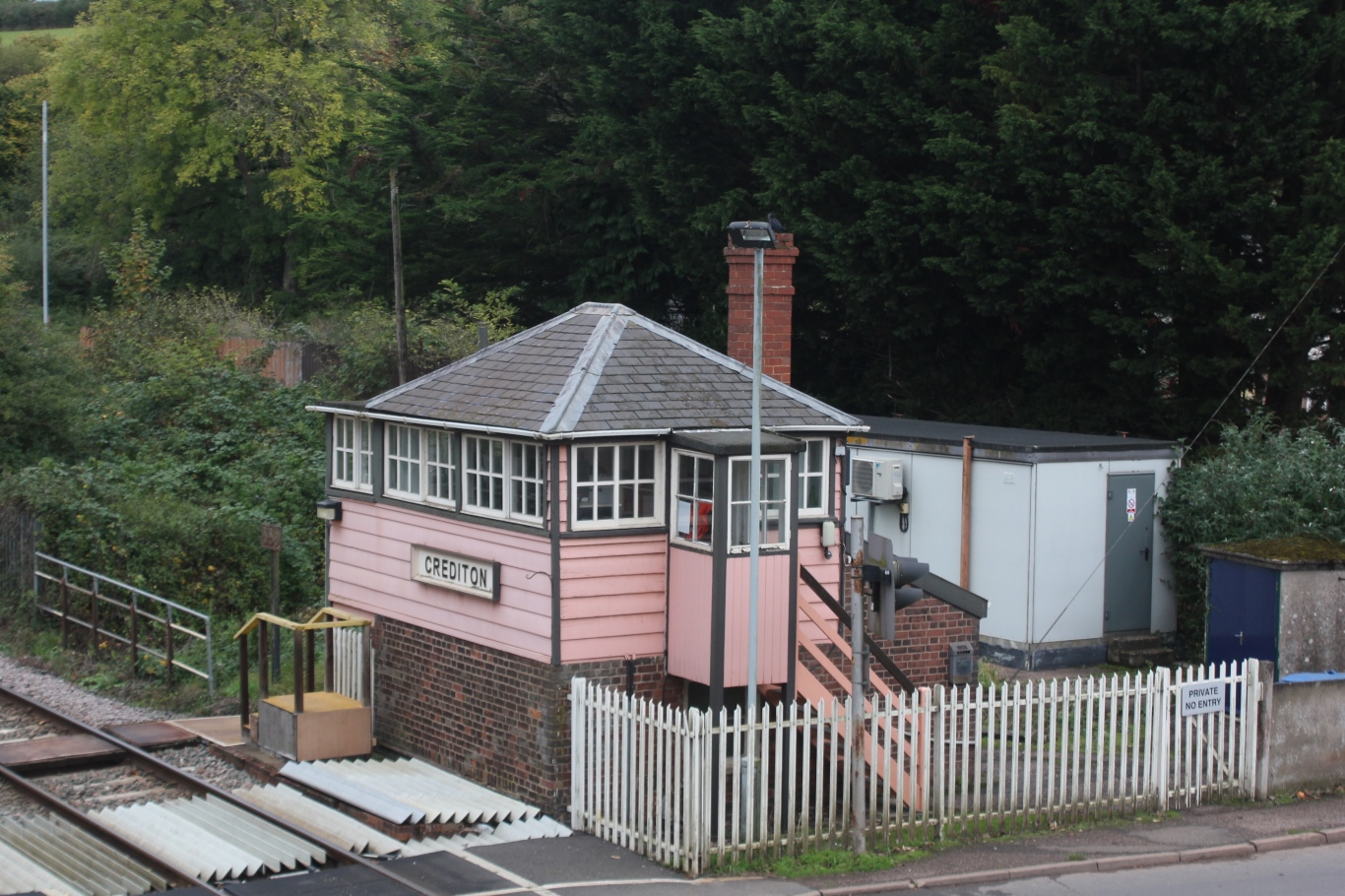
The signal box was built in 1875

When the station first opened, train were controlled by disc and crossbar signals controlled individually. Semphore signals controlled by two signal boxes were introduced in 1875 When the second track towards Exeter was added in 1875. Both boxes were on the north side of the line, one at each end of the station. All control was concentrated at Crediton West box in 1916 but the old East box was retained as a ground frame to control the connection to the goods yard.

On 17 October 1971 the junction for the Okehampton line at Coleford was closed and Crediton became the junction instead, leaving two single tracks westwards to Coleford. The London South Western style signals were replaced by Great Western Railway style signals at this time. The level crossing gates were replaced by lifting barriers in 1974. Further change occurred on 16 December 1984 when the line from Crediton to Cowley Bridge Junction in Exeter was reduced to a single track and all signals at Crediton were replaced by colour light signals. The mechanical lever frame in Crediton signal box was replaced by an electric panel. There is now no signal box beyond Crediton on either line, the two single tracks are controlled by tokens which ensures there is just one train on the line at any time. Train drivers going to Barnstaple exchange their token in the No Signalman Token Remote (NSTR) equipment at Eggesford.

== Community railway ==
The railway between Exeter and Barnstaple is promoted as the Tarka Line. It is designated as a community railway and supported by the Devon and Cornwall Rail Partnership.

The Friends of Crediton Station actively promote the station and have been involved in schemes such as planting flower beds. The main station building at Crediton contains the Tea Rooms which are operated by the Turning Tides Project community group. These appeared in a list of "highly commended" station cafes published in The Guardian in 2009.
