= Sampford Courtenay =

Village in Devon, England

Coordinates: 50.7923°N 3.9451°W

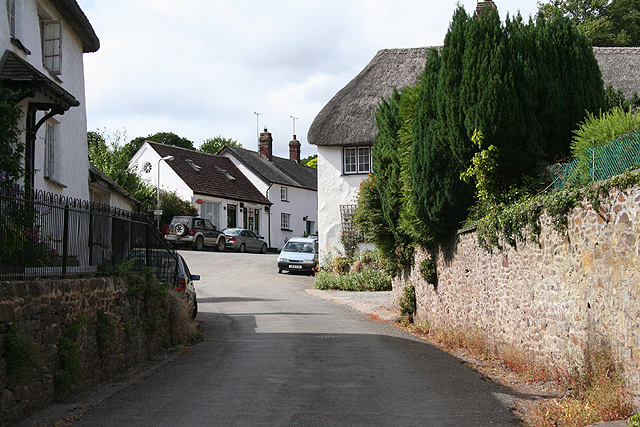
- Sampford Courtenay

- Location within Devon
- Population: 600 (2019)
- OS grid reference: SS6301
- Civil parish: Sampford Courtenay
- District: West Devon
- Shire county: Devon
- Region: South West
- Country: England
- Sovereign state: United Kingdom
- Post town: OKEHAMPTON
- Postcode district: EX20
- Dialling code: 01837
- UK Parliament: Torridge and West Devon

Sampford Courtenay is a village and civil parish in West Devon in England, most famous for being the place where the Western Rebellion, otherwise known as the Prayerbook rebellion, first started, and where the rebels made their final stand. It has a population of around 600.

The Church of St Andrew is mainly built of granite and has an elegant tower.

Between 1867 and 1972, the village was served by the nearby Sampford Courtenay railway station at Belstone Corner. The station reopened for the heritage Dartmoor Railway between 2002 and 2021, after which it closed permanently. Network Rail reclaimed ownership of the Dartmoor line between Yeoford and Okehampton in 2021, but have no plans to reopen the station.

== Literature ==
Sampford Courtenay is the area author M. R. James had in mind for his short ghost story "Martin's Close" published in More Ghost Stories of an Antiquary in 1911. The New Inn featured in this story is also a real place and a grade II listed old coaching inn originally built in the 16th century.
