= Chapelton =

Chapelton is the name of several places:

- Chapelton, Devon, England
  - Chapelton railway station
- Chapelton, Jamaica
- Chapelton, Aberdeenshire, Scotland
- Chapelton, Port Glasgow, Scotland
- Chapelton, South Lanarkshire, Scotland

== See also ==
- Chapeltown (disambiguation)
- Chapeltoun, estate in East Ayrshire, Scotland
