= Sampford Courtenay railway station =

Railway station in Devon, England

Coordinates: 50.76975°N 3.94896°W

Sampford Courtenay
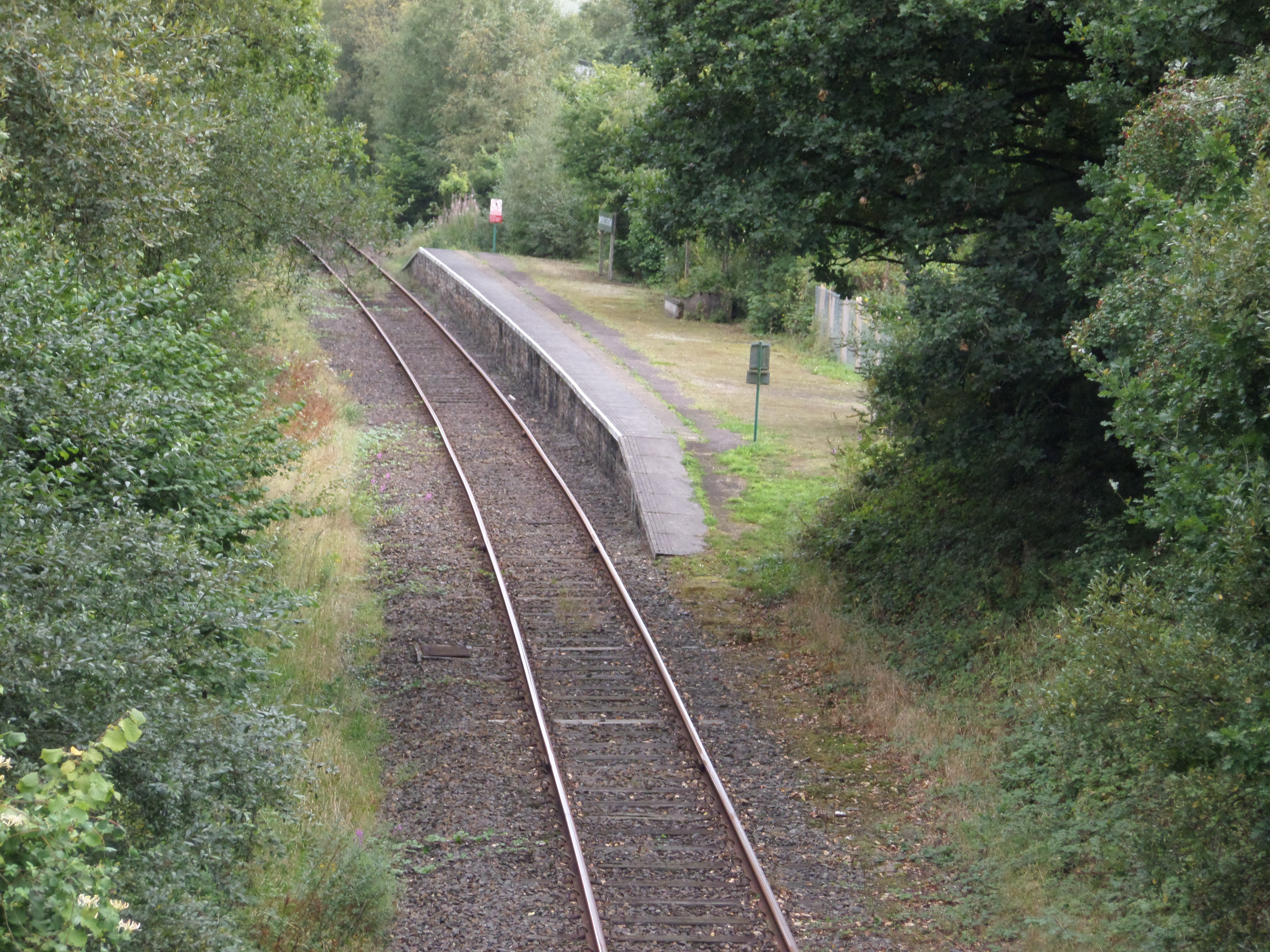
- The station in 2016

General information
- Location: Sampford Courtenay, West Devon; England
- Grid reference: SX626985
- Manager: Dartmoor Railway
- Platforms: 1

Other information
- Station code: SMC

Key dates
- 1867: Opened
- 5 June 1972: Closed to passengers by British Rail
- 2002: Re-opened by the Dartmoor Railway
- 2008: Dartmoor Railway services temporarily withdrawn, County Summer Sunday service retained
- 2009: Dartmoor Railway services reintroduced alongside County Summer Sunday service
- 8 September 2019: Last train ran (Dartmoor Railway)
- March 2021: Indefinite closure announced

Passengers
- 2016/17: ▲144
- 2017/18: ▲188
- 2018/19: ▼186
- 2019/20: ▲240
- 2020/21: ▼0
Location
Notes
- Passenger statistics from the Office of Rail and Road

Sampford Courtenay railway station was a railway station at Belstone Corner, which used to serve the nearby (1.6 miles) village of Sampford Courtenay in Devon. The village lies 3 minutes away by car or around 30 minutes by foot via the B3215. In 2018–19 it was the least used station in Devon and in the South West and the tenth least used station in Great Britain. In 2020-21 it was no longer served, and was the joint least used station in Great Britain with zero passengers.

== History ==
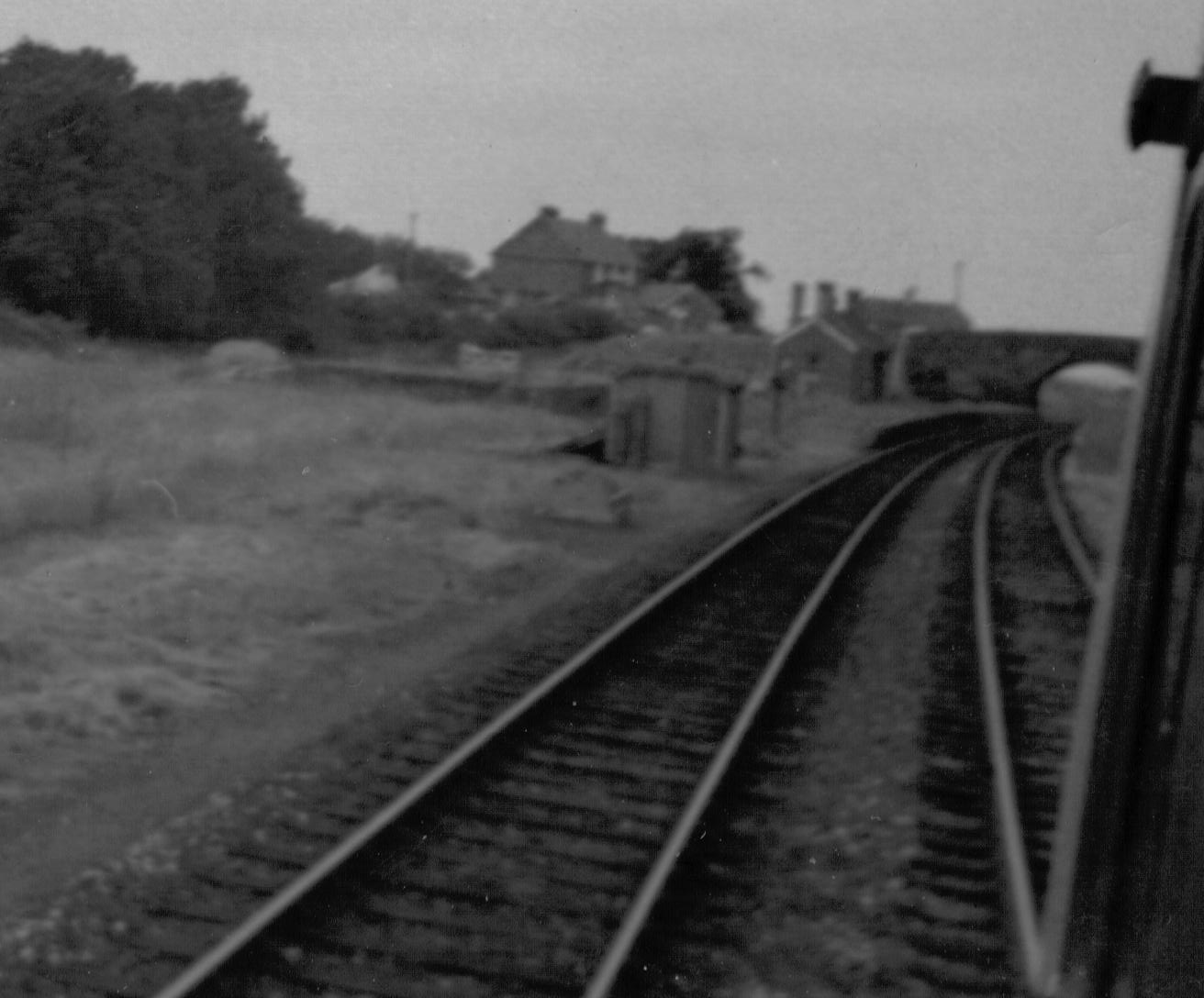
The station in October 1969

The station was originally opened by the London and South Western Railway (LSWR) as Okehampton Road when it formed the terminus and it was renamed as Belstone Corner when the line was extended to Okehampton in 1871, and later renamed again as Sampford Courtenay. Services on the line were extended further west to Lydford railway station with the inauguration of Meldon Viaduct in 1874. Constructed to rival the South Devon Railway route to Plymouth, the completion of the LSWR's own route to Plymouth saw this line become an important route with lines to Padstow and Bude as well as Plymouth. Boat trains carrying passengers from ocean liners calling at Stonehouse Pool, Plymouth and prestige services such as the Atlantic Coast Express and Devon Belle all used the route.

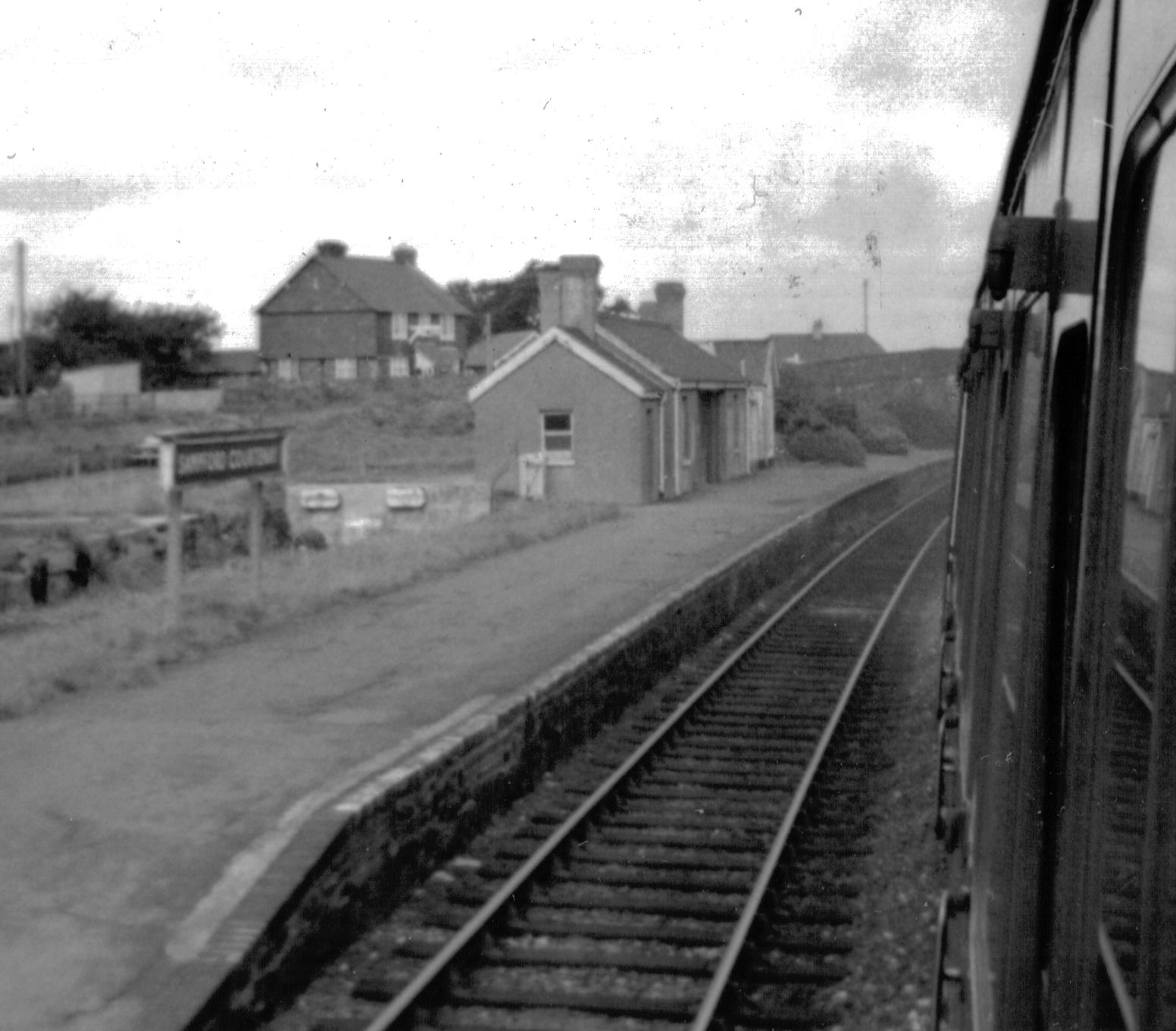
Sampford Courtenay in 1970

Following publication of the Beeching Report in 1963, the Exeter to Plymouth Line was cut back to Okehampton in 1968.

Bow, North Tawton, Sampford Courtenay and Okehampton lost their passenger services from 1972. The line survived, however, for the purposes of freight thanks to the activities of the British Rail ballast quarry at Meldon, three miles from Okehampton, which had an output of 300,000 tons per year. The quarry is not at present in operation and no freight originates from it. The quarry site is owned by Aggregate Industries.

The station name is sometimes given as Sampford Courtney, but it is unclear whether it was ever officially spelt this way.

== Reopening ==
The Dartmoor Railway reopened the former up side platform at the station in 2002. The Exeter to Okehampton service, known to many as the 'Sunday Rover', was operated by Great Western Railway, thanks to financial support from Devon County Council. Four return services were operated by Great Western Railway from Exeter and all served Sampford Courtenay. These trains were timetabled to link in with Dartmoor Rover bus services and Dartmoor Railway services at Okehampton. Occasional heritage passenger services operated from the station, running to Okehampton and Meldon Quarry. Train services were suspended after the last train on Sunday 8 September 2019. Since 2021 the railway has enjoyed a reinstated hourly service from Exeter to Okehampton operated by GWR, however the trains do not call at Sampford Courtenay.

Disused railways
Okehampton	British Rail Western Region Exeter to Plymouth Line	North Tawton
Preceding station	Heritage railways	Following station
Okehampton towards Meldon Viaduct	Dartmoor Railway	Terminus
Great Western Railway does not stop here

== Future options ==
The Dartmoor Railway proposed to restore the interchange at Yeoford Junction where its line meets Great Western Railway's Tarka Line. The company looked to create a railhead at Okehampton which would serve local industry and thereby save 50,000 lorry journeys per year.

British American Railway Services became the new owner of the Dartmoor Railway on 4 September 2008. The company intended to develop freight, passenger and tourist services on the railway, however the line was put up for sale in January 2020 and purchased by Network Rail.

The Dartmoor Line reopened for regular passenger services on 20 November 2021. However, Sampford Courtenay is not part of the scheme, and there are currently no plans to reopen the station. Instead, Network Rail opened a new station at Okehampton Interchange on 1 August 2026.
