= Meldon Viaduct railway station =

Railway station in Devon, England

Meldon Quarry
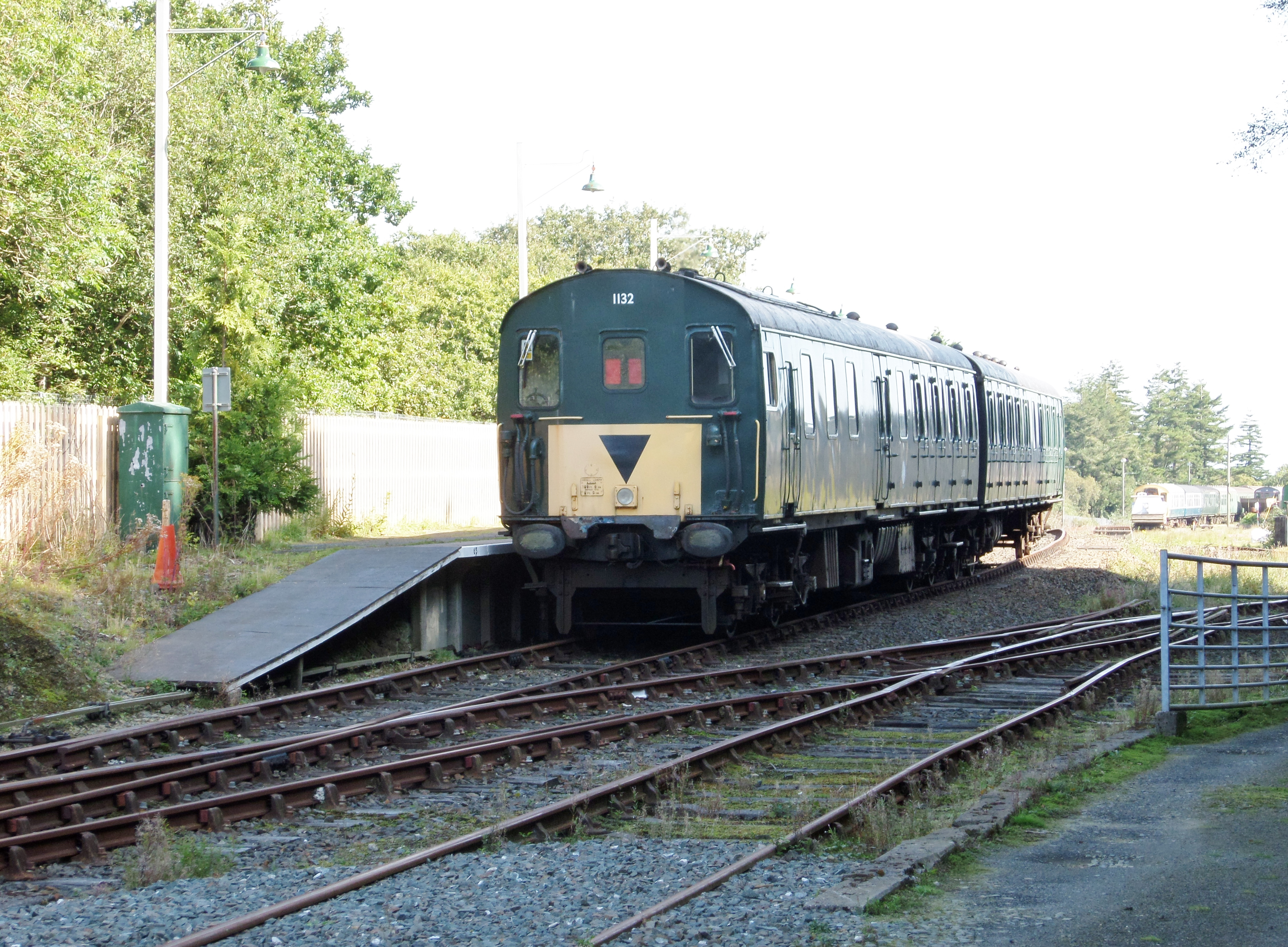
- A Class 205 "Thumper" at the station in 2013

General information
- Location: Meldon, West Devon; England
- Coordinates: 50.7148°N 4.0320°W
- Grid reference: SX566926
- System: Station on heritage railway
- Manager: Dartmoor Railway
- Platforms: 1

Key dates
- 1890: Opened
- 1968: Closed by British Rail
- 2000: New station opened by the Dartmoor Railway
- 2008: Dartmoor Railway services temporarily withdrawn during change of ownership
- 2009: Dartmoor Railway services reintroduced
- 29 September 2019: last train ran
Location

Meldon Viaduct railway station was a railway station at Meldon in Devon. It was renamed in 2015 from Meldon Quarry railway station.

== History ==
The station was originally constructed circa 1890 as Meldon Quarry Halt by the London and South Western Railway. This station had no public access and merely functioned as a staff halt for quarry workers, their families and other railway staff working at Meldon Quarry. The quarry originally had no metalled road access and some quarry workers and their families lived in cottages situated near the quarry. They used the halt for access to Okehampton. The halt was not shown in the public railway timetable and local passenger services would only call by special arrangement. A workmen's service from Okehampton also operated using a passenger coach attached to one of the ballast trains. The platforms of the halt were constructed using standard components manufactured at the Railway's own Concrete Works at Exmouth Junction. The platforms were very narrow and short, about the length of a single passenger coach. They were situated at the immediate east end of Meldon Viaduct, between the viaduct and Meldon Quarry signal box.

The Beeching Report in 1963 recommended that the Exeter to Plymouth Line be cut back to Okehampton; and when services ceased between there and Bere Alston in 1968, the Halt became disused. Some time later both platforms were demolished during modifications to the rail layout and access at the western end of Meldon Quarry.

Bow, North Tawton, Sampford Courtenay and Okehampton lost their passenger services from 1972. But freight traffic continued on the line thanks to the activities of the British Rail ballast quarry at Meldon, three miles from Okehampton, which had an output of 300,000 tons per year. The quarry is now owned by Aggregate Industries. The quarry is currently out of use and 'mothballed'.

== Reopening ==
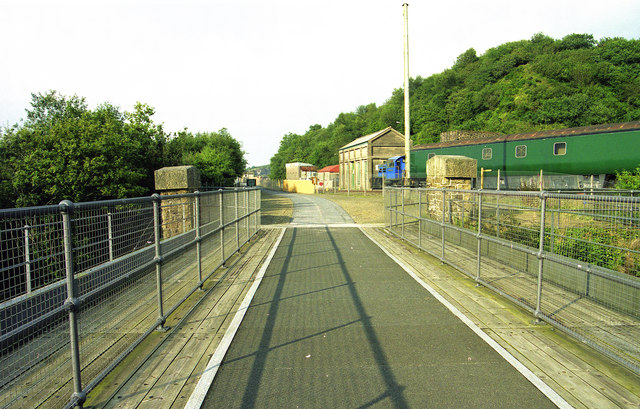
The cycle track over the viaduct and station site

A new station at Meldon Quarry was opened during 2000 by Dartmoor Railway to act as the terminus of a passenger service from Okehampton. It has a single platform adjacent to the former up line but situated slightly nearer to Okehampton than the former Staff Halt. It is an entirely new construction unrelated to the previous Halt. The station was further improved in 2002 with the installation of concrete platform walling and a wooden platform shelter in BR Southern Region style and colour scheme. In 2015 the station was renamed Meldon Viaduct. It was the western terminus of Dartmoor Railway heritage passenger services to Okehampton and Sampford Courtenay prior to the reintroduction of regular National railway services between Exeter and Okehampton. The station has no motor vehicle access but does have excellent pedestrian and cycle access via The Granite Way Cycleway, part of Devon Coast to Coast Cycle Route, and has links to Dartmoor via the local footpath network. From 2010 to 2013 there was a buffet situated near the station in a former SR electric multiple unit buffet car. The car overlooked Meldon Viaduct and the surrounding valleys.

British American Railway Services Ltd, a new company created by Iowa Pacific Holdings of Chicago, became the new owner of the Dartmoor Railway on 4 September 2008. The company will develop freight, passenger and tourist services on the railway. Train services were suspended after the last train on 29 September 2019.

The station was last open to passenger services at the end of September 2019. Dartmoor Railway CIC went into administration in February 2020 and has now been wound up. The line was purchased by Network Rail from Aggregate Industries in June 2021 and regular services resumed in November 2021 between Exeter and Okehampton. The line beyond Okehampton to Meldon is currently out of use with Meldon Viaduct station now being owned by Network Rail. Although out of use it remains the only railway station with a connection to the national network situated within Dartmoor National Park.

Preceding station	Heritage railways	Following station
Disused railways
Terminus	Dartmoor Railway	Okehampton towards Sampford Courtenay
