= North Tawton railway station =

Former railway station in Devon, England

Coordinates: 50.7844°N 3.8939°W

North Tawton
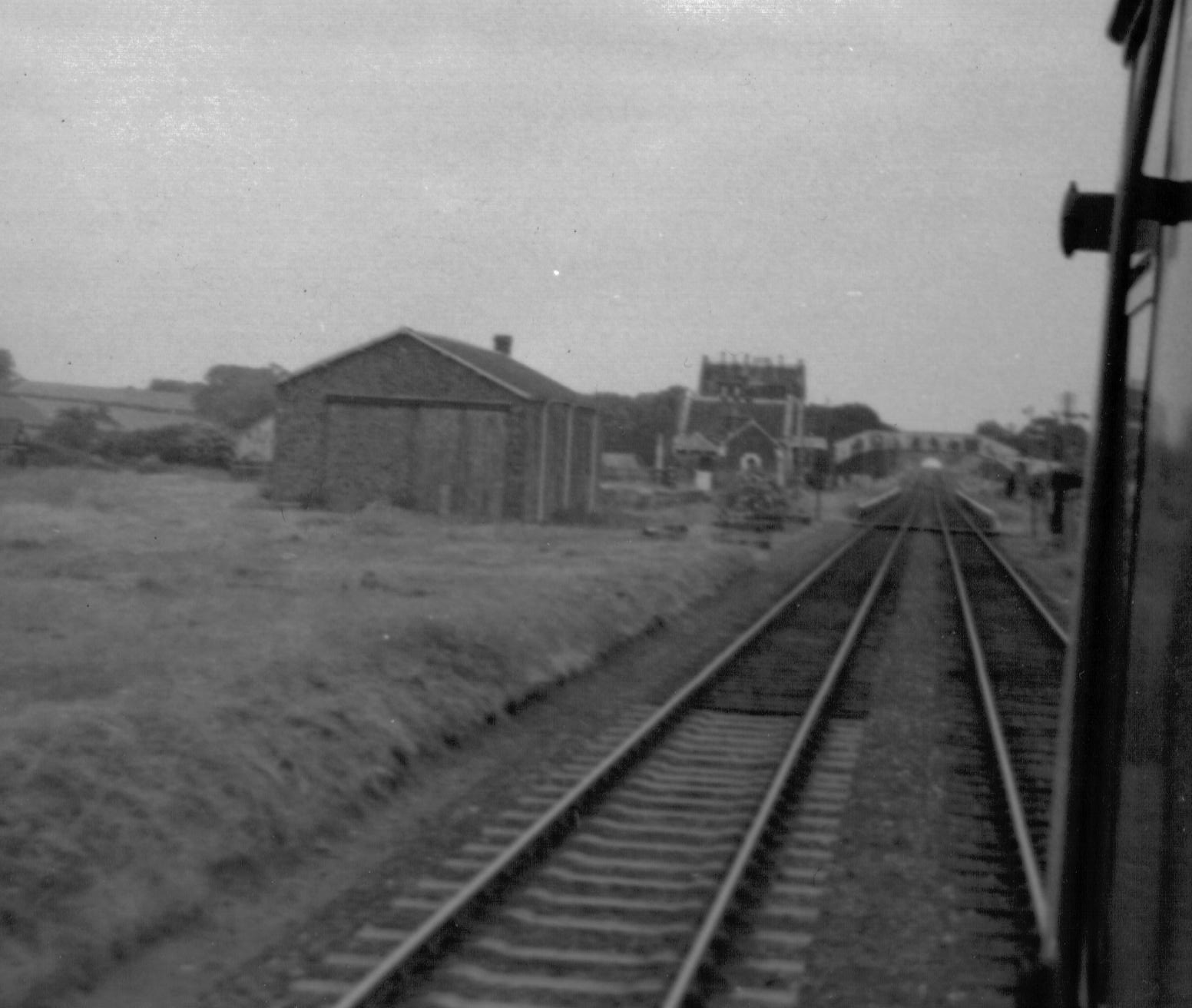
- North Tawton station in 1969

General information
- Location: North Tawton, West Devon; England
- Platforms: 2

Other information
- Status: Disused

History
- Original company: Devon and Cornwall Railway
- Pre-grouping: London & South Western Railway
- Post-grouping: Southern Railway

Key dates
- 1865: Opened
- 5 June 1972: Closed to passengers
Location

North Tawton railway station was a railway station serving the town of North Tawton in Devon, England. North Tawton lies on the River Taw.

== History ==
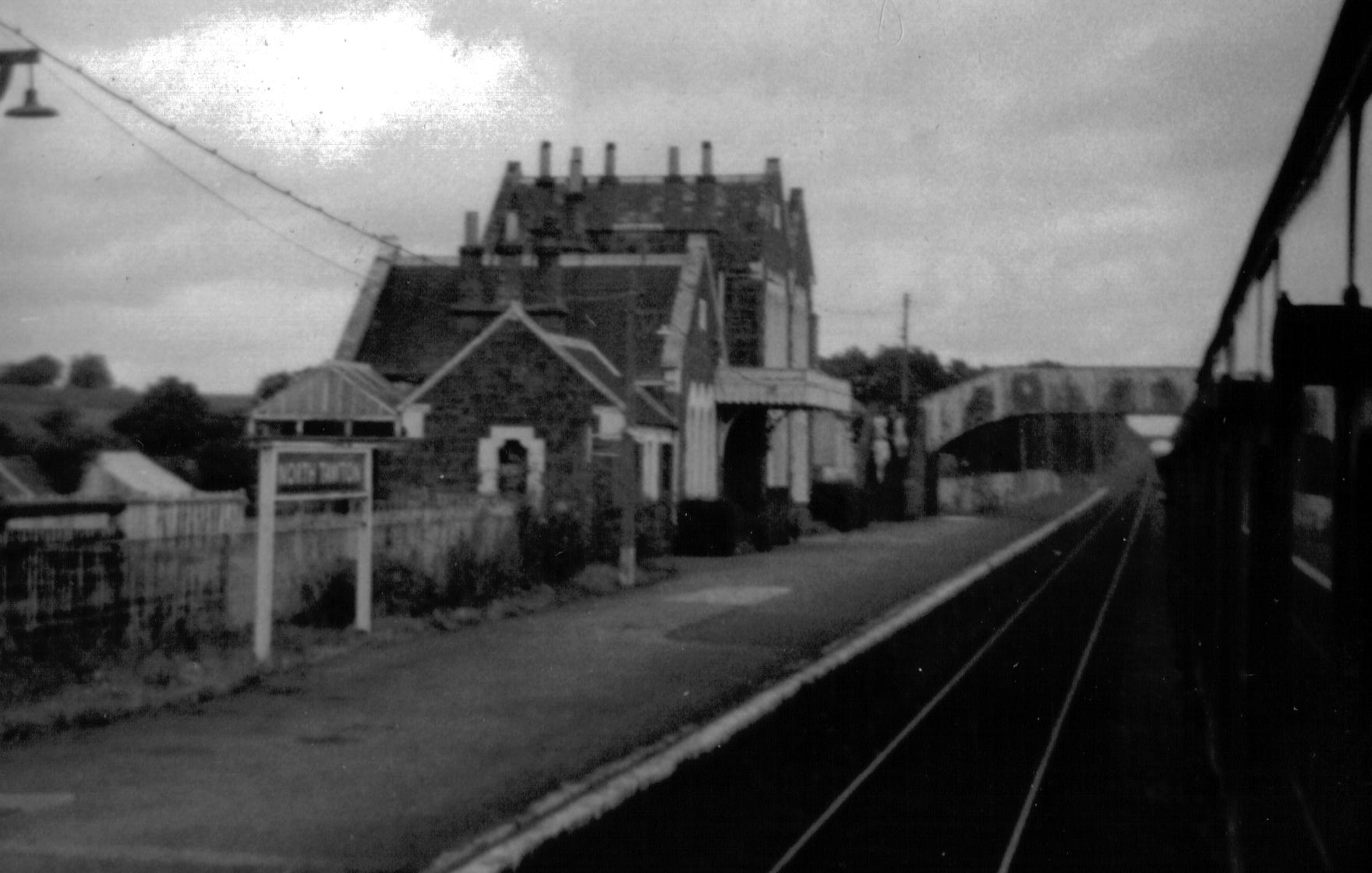
North Tawton station in 1970.

The station was originally opened by the London and South Western Railway (LSWR) in 1865. Services on the line were extended further west to Okehampton Road by 1867 and then on to Lydford railway station with the inauguration of Meldon Viaduct in 1874. Constructed to rival the South Devon Railway route to Plymouth, the completion of the LSWR's own route to Plymouth saw this line become an important route with lines to Padstow and Bude as well as Plymouth. Boat trains carrying passengers from ocean liners calling at Stonehouse Pool, Plymouth and prestige services such as the Atlantic Coast Express and Devon Belle all used the route.

Following the publication of the Beeching Report in 1963, the Exeter to Plymouth Line was cut back to Okehampton in 1968.

North Tawton, Bow, Sampford Courtenay and Okehampton lost their regular passenger services from 1972. The line survived, however, for the purposes of freight thanks to the activities of the British Rail ballast quarry at Meldon, three miles from Okehampton, which had an output of 300,000 tons per year. The quarry survived until the 2000s, operated by Aggregate Industries.

Since closure the station building has been converted to a private residence.

Preceding station		Following station
Sampford Courtenay	British Rail Western Region Exeter to Plymouth Line	Bow

== Recent developments ==
The Dartmoor Railway proposed to restore the interchange at Yeoford, running passenger trains past North Tawton, where its line met First Great Western's Tarka Line. British American Railway Services, a new company created by Iowa Pacific Holdings of Chicago, became the new owner of the Dartmoor line on 4 September 2008 with the intention of developing freight, passenger and tourist services on the railway.

Subsequently, infrastructure ownership transferred to Network Rail and on 20 November 2021 regular passenger services between Exeter and Okehampton resumed, operated by Great Western Railway. Crediton is the only intermediate stop on that service.

The original platforms at North Tawton station are several feet below track level, as the line through the former station site was raised during the 1970s, to increase the height of the adjacent road bridge when the A3124 road was upgraded.
