= Chapeltown =

Chapeltown may refer to:

- Chapel Town, Cornwall, England
- Chapeltown, Lancashire, a village in the borough of Blackburn with Darwen, England
- Chapeltown, South Yorkshire, a suburb of Sheffield, South Yorkshire, England
- Chapeltown, Leeds, a suburb of Leeds, West Yorkshire, England
- Chapeltown, County Kerry, a village on Valentia Island, Ireland
- Chapeltown, Moray, Scotland

== See also ==
- Chapelton (disambiguation)
- Chapeltoun, estate in East Ayrshire, Scotland
