= Okehampton Interchange railway station =

Railway station in Devon, England

Okehampton Interchange
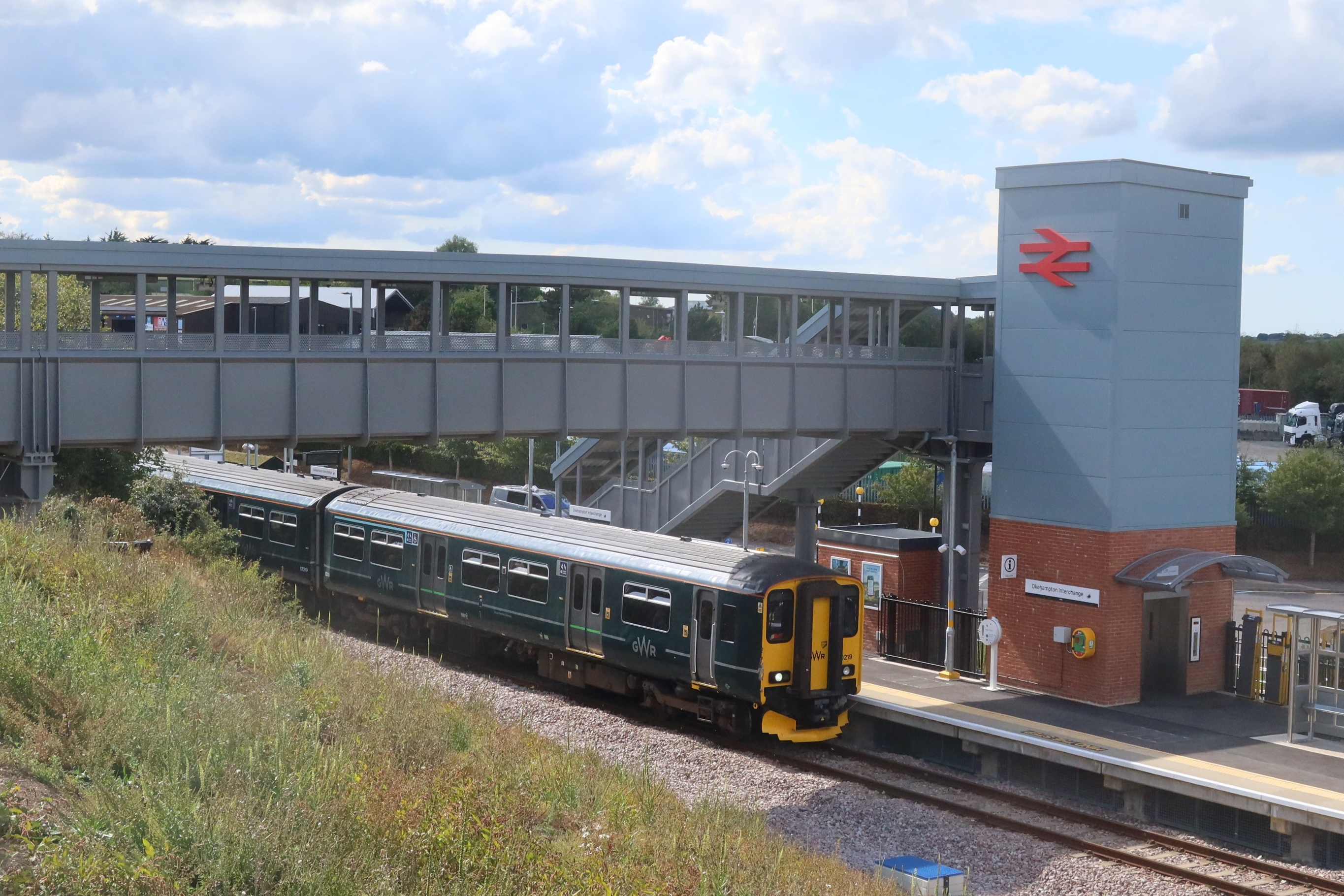

General information
- Location: Okehampton, West Devon, Devon; England
- Coordinates: 50.7433933°N 3.976171°W
- Manager: Great Western Railway
- Platforms: 1

Other information
- Station code: OKI

Key dates
- February 2024: Construction began
- 1 August 2026: Station opened
Location

Okehampton Interchange (formerly known as Okehampton Parkway) is a railway station in Okehampton, Devon on the Dartmoor Line. The station is sited off Exeter Road, by the Business Park and close to the junction with the A30, in the Stockley Hamlet area of Okehampton. Its location will allow it to serve 900 new homes that are to be built nearby.

Following the Government announcing the reopening of some of the rail lines that were closed in the 1960s and 1970s, the line through the site was proposed for a new intermediate station between Okehampton and Crediton. Devon County Council purchased a site for a new station.

== History ==
Devon County Council said in January 2018 that it was looking at options for a new Okehampton Parkway station from which regular services to Exeter could operate. By April 2018 there were two preferred options for this new station:

- a double-sided platform with a through platform and a bay platform, or
- a single-sided platform on the south side of the railway with staggered faces.

Exeter-bound trains could use the through platform on the north side, and the heritage Dartmoor Railway would use the bay platform; however the Dartmoor Railway ceased operations in 2020. The railway between Okehampton and Exeter reopened on 20 November 2021 as the Dartmoor Line.

The station is part of the county council's Devon Metro scheme and was described as a priority station for construction. Plans and funding were announced for a "West Devon Transport Hub" east of Okehampton in November 2023. The station was planned to have one platform, a lift, and parking for 200 cars. The station name was announced in May 2024 to be Okehampton Interchange. Funding was approved by the Government in June 2024 as part of the Levelling Up Project. Ground preparation work started towards the end of 2024 and construction work started in February 2025.

The station opened on 31 July 2026, with an official opening ceremony and a special train for officials. The first public services began on 1 August.

== Description ==
The station is 195 miles 75 chains (315.3 km; 195.9 mi) from London Waterloo which is 25 mi 45 ch (41.1 km; 25.6 mi) from Exeter Central. There is a single 100 m (330 ft) platform on the north side of the track.

== Services ==
All services at Okehampton Interchange are operated by Great Western Railway. There is generally one train per hour in each direction between Okehampton and Exeter Central.

Preceding station	National Rail	Following station
Okehampton Terminus	Great Western Railway Dartmoor Line	Crediton towards Exeter Central
