= Chapelton railway station =

Railway station in Devon, England

Chapelton
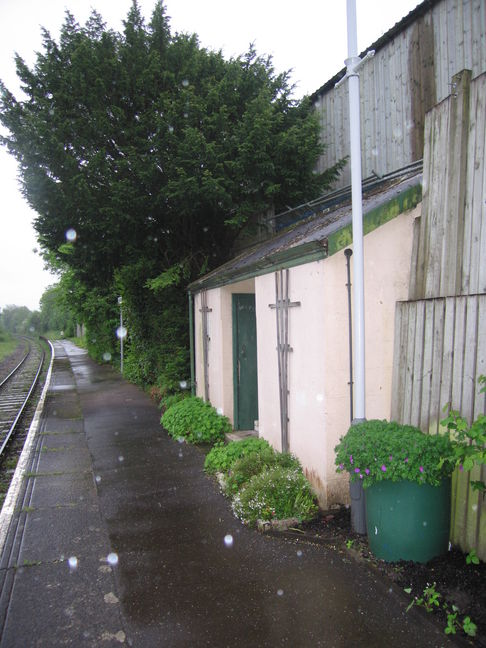
- Looking south towards Exeter

General information
- Location: Tawstock, North Devon; England
- Coordinates: 51.016°N 4.024°W
- Grid reference: SS580260
- Manager: Great Western Railway
- Platforms: 1

Other information
- Station code: CPN
- Classification: DfT category F2

History
- Original company: North Devon Railway
- Pre-grouping: London and South Western Railway
- Post-grouping: Southern Railway

Key dates
- 1857: opened
- 1860: closed
- 1875: reopened

Passengers
- 2021/22: ▲142
- 2022/23: ▲194
- 2023/24: ▼186
- 2024/25: ▼160
- 2025/26: ▼148
Location
Notes
- Passenger statistics from the Office of Rail and Road

Chapelton railway station serves the hamlet of Chapelton, part of the civil parish of Tawstock in the English county of Devon. It is a rural station on the Tarka Line to Barnstaple, 35 miles 52 chains (57.4 km) from Exeter Central at milepost 207 from London Waterloo.

It is the least used station in Devon in most year's government statistics, for example it had just 186 passengers recorded in the 2023–24 year.

== History ==
The North Devon Railway opened through Chapelton on 1 August 1854 but there was only a goods siding at that time. A wooden platform was erected on the east side of the single track so passengers could use the trains from 8 June 1857. Trains called every day for a while but then from the following April they were reduced to just two days most weeks. By October they were calling on Fridays only until April 1860 when they stopped all together. A new stone platform was built and services resumed on 1 March 1875.

The line was doubled on 19 October 1890 so a second platform was built for the new northbound line. A signal box was built on the new platform behind which was the station's goods yard. Much of the freight traffic was timber from a sawmill that was opened in 1930. Much of the timber was sold to railway companies (who used it to build freight wagons) and coal mines (for pit props).

The goods yard was closed on 4 January 1965 and the signal box, which had mainly been opened only when goods trains were shunting, was closed on 26 January 1966. On 21 May 1971 the line was reduced to just a single track again.

== Description ==
The station is situated a little to the south of the hamlet of Chapelton alongside the A377 road. A footpath crosses the railway that leads to the minor road on the east side of the valley.

The single platform, which is long enough for a 7 coach train, is on the west side of the track. There is a car park, bike rack, and waiting shelter. The building on the disused platform opposite was built for the station master but is now in private use.

== Services ==
All services at Chapelton are operated by Great Western Railway. Only a limited number of trains (two each way on Monday-Saturdays and four each way on Sundays) between Barnstaple and Exeter Central call at Chapelton and this is only on request to the conductor or by signalling the driver as it approaches.

Preceding station	National Rail	Following station
Barnstaple Terminus	Great Western Railway Tarka Line	Umberleigh towards Exeter Central

== Community railway ==
The railway between Exeter and Barnstaple is designated as a community railway and is supported by marketing provided by the Devon and Cornwall Rail Partnership. The line is promoted as the Tarka Line.
