= Dartmoor line =

Railway line in Devon, England

Coordinates: 50.732°N 3.996°W

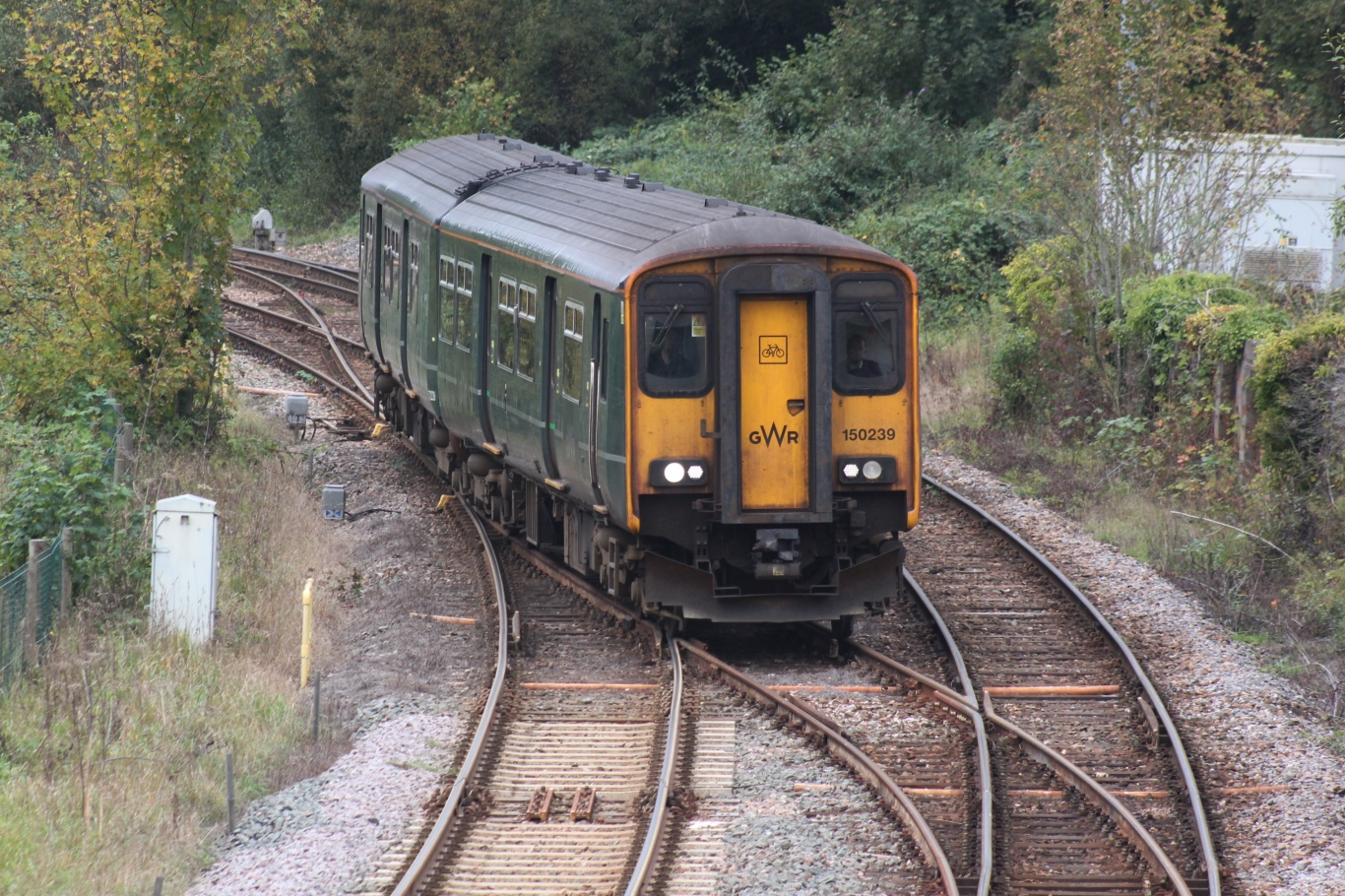
- The junction for the Dartmoor Line at Crediton

Overview
- Status: Operational
- Owner: Network Rail
- Locale: Devon, England
- Termini: Crediton; Okehampton
- Stations: 2
- Website: dartmoorline.com

Service
- Type: Heavy rail
- System: National Rail
- Operator: Great Western Railway
- Rolling stock: Class 150; Class 166
- Ridership: 0.361 million (2023)

History
- Opened: 1865

Technical
- Line length: 15 1/2-mile (24.9 km)
- Num of tracks: 1
- Character: Rural
- Track gauge: 4 ft 8 1/2 in (1,435 mm) standard gauge
Route map
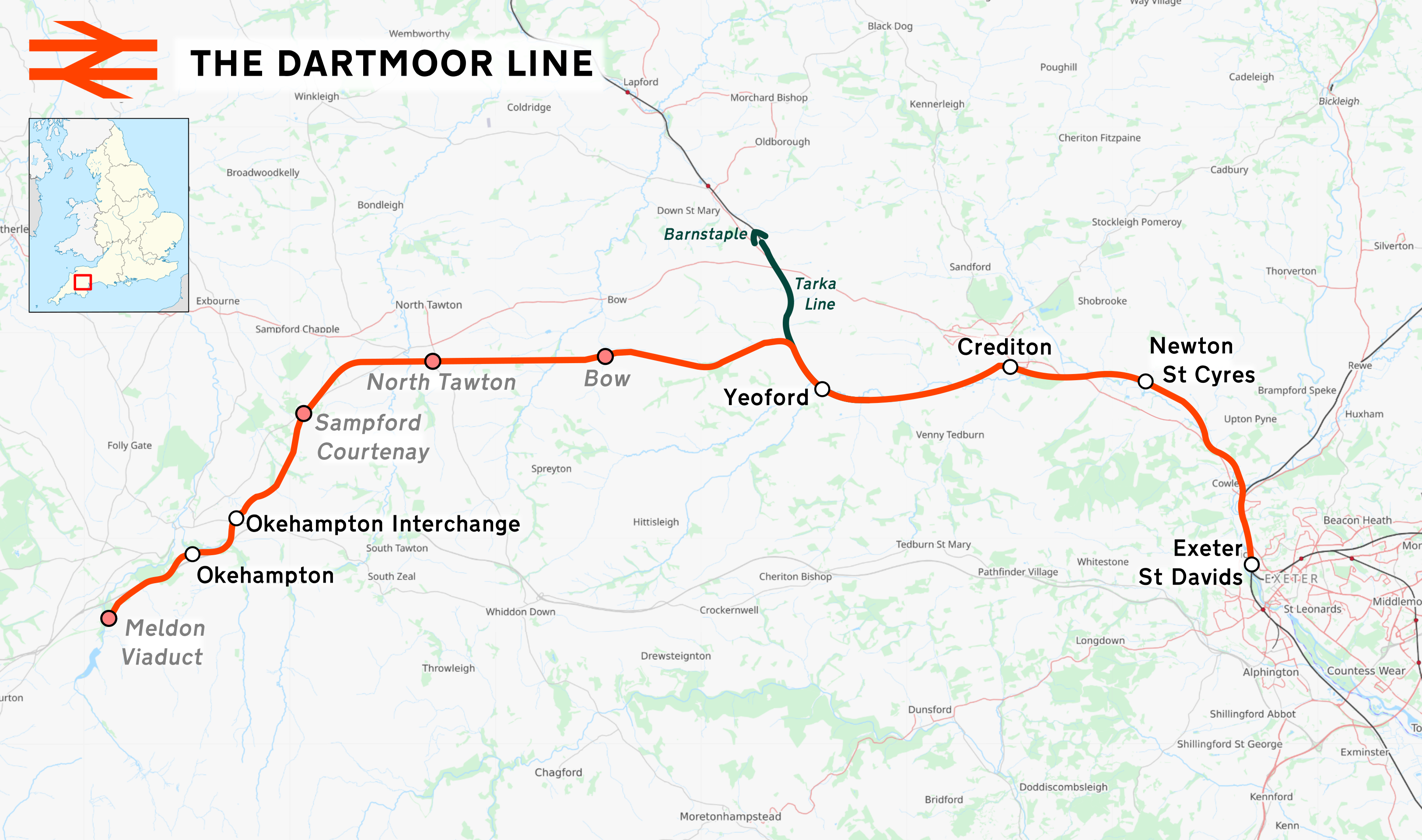

The Dartmoor line is a 15 1/2-mile (24.9 km) railway line in Devon, England. From Crediton, the line runs alongside the Tarka Line to the site of the former Coleford Junction where it diverges west to Okehampton. Previously a heritage line, it is owned by Network Rail.

The route was originally part of the London and South Western Railway's route from Exeter to Plymouth, which was opened between 1865 and 1879. In 1968, British Rail closed the line beyond Meldon (two miles (3.2 km) beyond Okehampton) as part of the Beeching cuts. The Exeter to Okehampton passenger service was withdrawn by British Rail in 1972. The line itself remained open for freight services from the railway ballast quarry at Meldon.

From 1997 to 2019, the line was operated as a heritage railway by the Dartmoor Railway community interest company. During this time, Great Western Railway ran a public service between Exeter and Okehampton on summer Sundays. Meldon quarry was mothballed in 2011, ceasing the use of the line for freight.

In July 2021, as part of the government's Restoring Your Railway programme, the line was transferred to Network Rail ownership, and regular National Rail passenger services began in November of the same year.

== History ==
=== Construction ===
The Okehampton Railway, an independent company supported by the London and South Western Railway, was authorised on 17 July 1862 to build a line on the northern margins of Dartmoor from Coleford Junction (north west of Crediton) to Okehampton. Before the line was built it had been leased to the LSWR and an extension authorised to Lidford. In 1864 it was renamed as the Devon and Cornwall Railway (which was absorbed into the LSWR in 1872, before the new line opened) and construction finally started. It opened slowly in sections: from Coleford Junction to North Tawton on 1 November 1865; from there to Okehampton Road (later renamed Sampford Courtenay) on 8 January 1867; to Okehampton itself on 3 October 1871; and finally to Lydford on 12 October 1874. This allowed trains to run a through service to Plymouth.

Construction went around natural obstacles, rather than going over or through them as earlier builders had done. The section from Coleford Junction through Bow to North Tawton is simple and contains a 4-mile (6.4 km) straight section, but the line soon begins to curve as it climbs the edge at Dartmoor, at a 1 in 77 gradient. Okehampton station is located on the edge of the moor, 200 feet (61 m) above the town. The high point of the line is about two miles further, reaching 950 feet (290 m) near Meldon Viaduct.

The LSWR became a part of the new, larger Southern Railway at the Grouping in 1923. This in turn became the Southern Region of British Railways on nationalisation in 1948.

=== British Rail ===
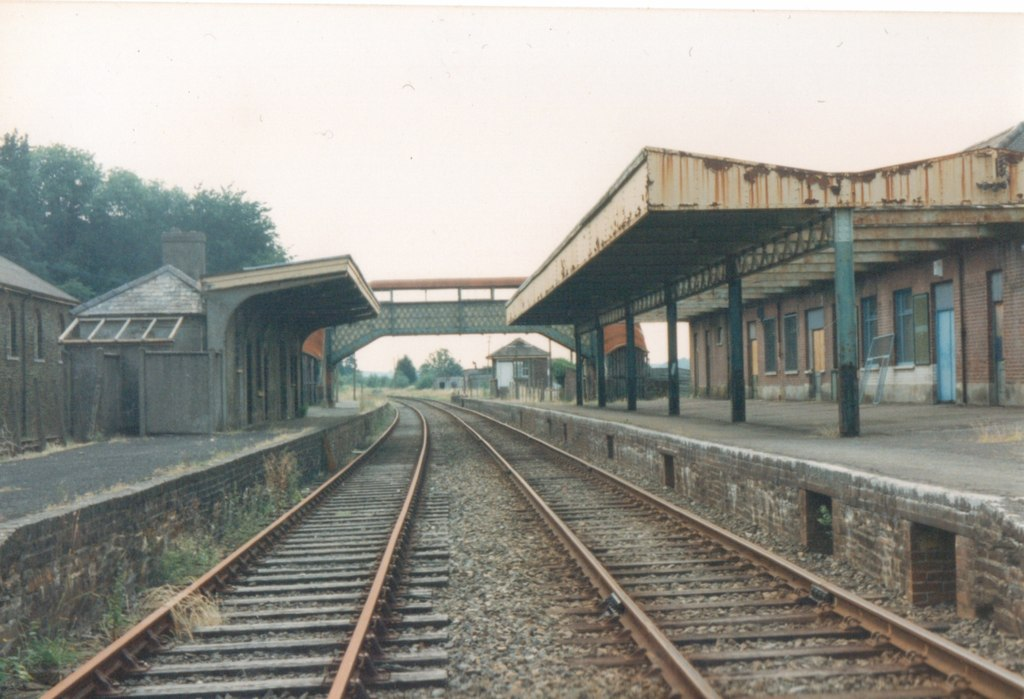
Okehampton in 1995, two years before its restoration

At the peak of services through Okehampton in the 1950s, there were twelve or more daily trains in each direction; on summer Saturdays, this could increase with duplicate Atlantic Coast Express services. In the early 1960s, a car transporter train ran between Surbiton and Okehampton on summer Saturdays, bringing holidaymakers and their cars from the London area.

Trains between Exeter and Plymouth via Okehampton were withdrawn from 6 May 1968, leaving a shuttle service to run between Exeter and Okehampton. The 20-mile (32 km) section between Meldon Quarry and Bere Alston was lifted, and between Meldon and Okehampton the line was only retained for freight trains. Okehampton to Exeter passenger services were withdrawn on 5 June 1972.

Between 1972 and 1997, the line was used for railway ballast traffic from Meldon Quarry and occasional freight traffic to the remaining goods yard at Okehampton before its closure. Though the closure of the route was in part to save on the maintenance expenditure of Meldon Viaduct, the structure remained in use as a headshunt for the quarry, given a new layout in 1979 for increased traffic. Occasional charter and special trains were operated to Okehampton and Meldon Quarry during the passenger closure period. The railway reopened to regular passenger services in 1997 with the formation of Dartmoor Railway.

=== Heritage operation ===
The Dartmoor line from Coleford Junction to Okehampton was in heritage operation from 1997 to 2019. The origins of the restored Dartmoor Railway lie in British Rail's 1994 sale of Meldon Quarry to Camas Aggregates, a multinational quarrying company, along with the railway line up to its junction with Network Rail at Coleford. A collaboration between Devon County Council, West Devon Borough Council and the Dartmoor National Park Authority led to the creation of a plan to restore and regenerate the line and Okehampton station for tourism, with the county council purchasing the station in 1996 for a nominal price from Camas.

Works to refurbish Okehampton station included renovating the station building, raising the platform, restoring the awning, and converting the goods shed into a youth hostel. The building reopened on 24 May 1997. Part of it was leased to a model shop and buffet.

The Dartmoor Railway began operation in 1997 with a fleet of historic locomotives, coaches, and diesel and electric multiple units. They included classes 08, 47, 117, 205, 411, 421 and 438. Steam-hauled charter services also visited occasionally. RMS Locotec was contracted to maintain the line and rolling stock.

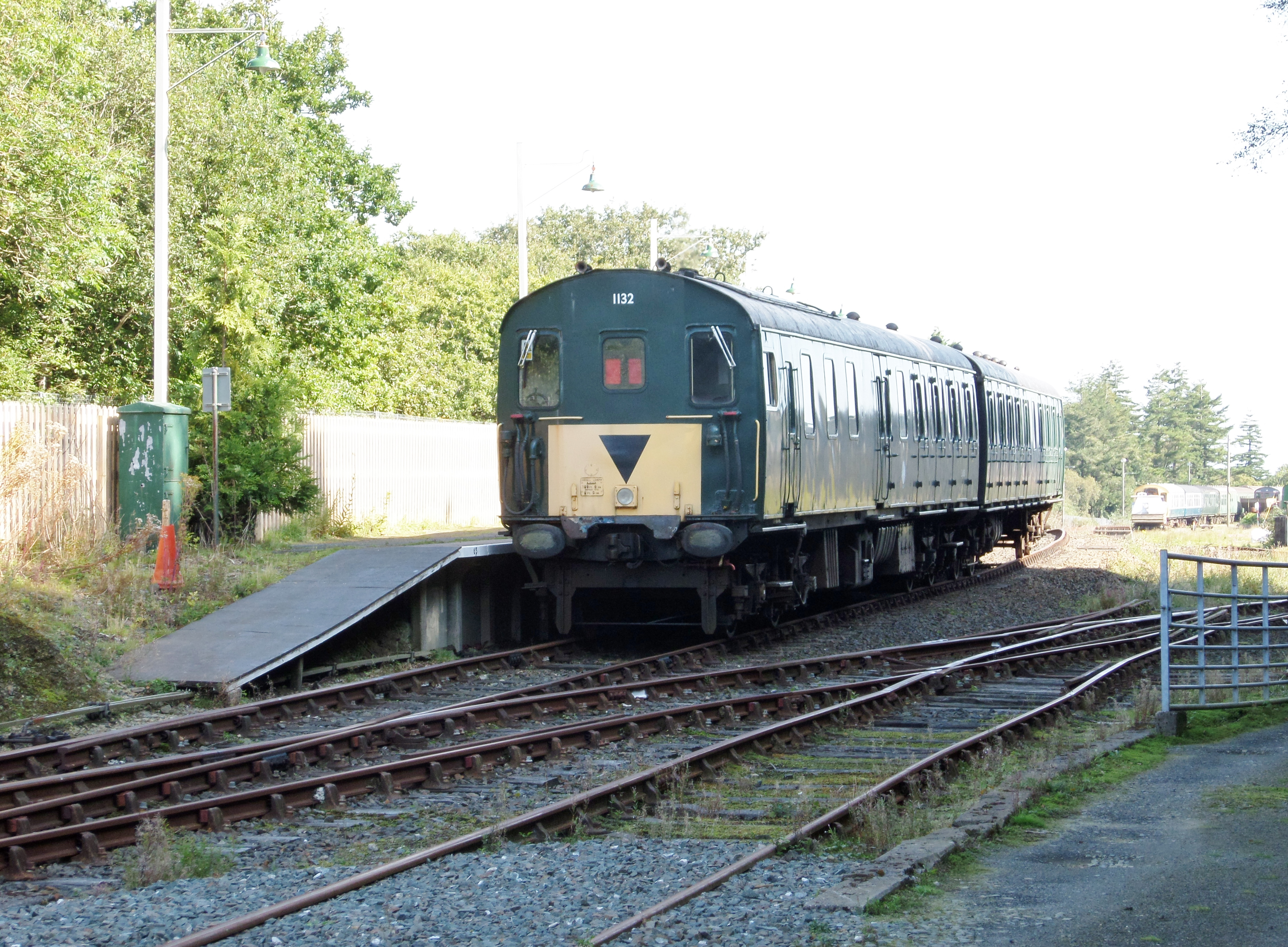
A heritage Class 205 train at Meldon Viaduct station in 2013

Meldon Viaduct, an iron truss bridge about 2.2 miles (3.5 km) further up the line from Okehampton, was designated as a scheduled monument and refurbished shortly after the opening of the heritage railway; a new station of the same name, unrelated to any historic station, was built at its eastern end in 2000 for the heritage railway. The track across the viaduct was lifted in 1990 as the structure was assessed to be too weak to take the weight of a train.

In September 2008, British American Railway Services Ltd, a company created by Iowa Pacific Holdings of Chicago, became the new owner of the Dartmoor Railway community interest company. The company announced its intention to develop freight, passenger and tourist services on the railway. Heritage services ran between Okehampton and Meldon Viaduct, extended to Sampford Courtenay, Bow or the Dartmoor Railway–Network Rail boundary on special event days. The former stations at North Tawton and Bow remain closed to passengers: both are privately owned and have no public access. Themed trains were introduced for special occasions such as Christmas, with names like The Polar Express and The Train to Christmas Town.

The quarry at Meldon was mothballed in 2011, bringing an end to stone freight trains using the line. Heritage train services ceased in December 2019 and, in February 2020, the railway entered administration. Rolling stock based at Okehampton station was moved to Meldon Quarry, with most offered for resale.

==== Public train services ====
After the heritage Dartmoor Railway opened in 1997, First Great Western operated a summer Sunday service of four return trips direct from Exeter between May and September, sponsored by Devon County Council. These trains connected with bus services and heritage railway services at Okehampton, Tarka Line rail services at Crediton and other national rail services at Exeter.

Devon and Cornwall Railways (a subsidiary of British American Railway Services) announced its intention to operate through services from Okehampton to Exeter in 2010, having made a track access application to Network Rail on 18 March 2010 to operate four return services each weekday between Okehampton and St James Park and a further two (plus one on Sundays) as far as Exeter St Davids. The service would have run under an open access licence.

=== Network Rail ===
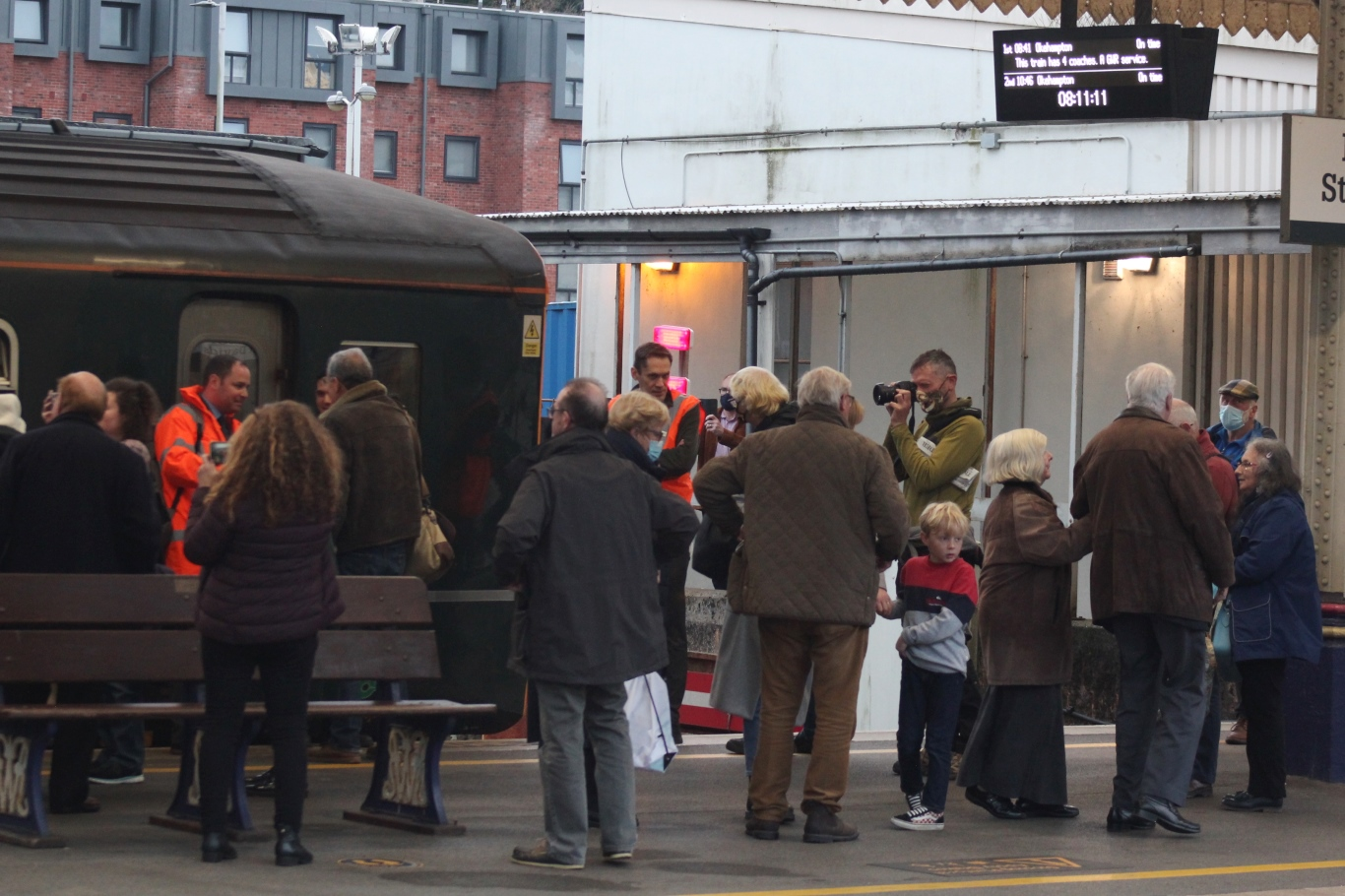
The first train from Okehampton arrives at Exeter St Davids on reopening day, 20 November 2021

On 19 March 2021, it was announced that the Dartmoor Line would reopen to regular, year-round services by the end of the year as the first project delivered as part of the government's "Restoring Your Railway" programme.

Preparatory work began on reopening the railway between Okehampton and Coleford Junction as soon as Government funding was confirmed in March. By May 2021, Network Rail had laid more than 11 miles (18 km) of new track, 24,000 concrete sleepers and 29,000 tonnes (64,000,000 lb) of ballast, and installed drainage and new fencing. The total cost to reinstate the line was £40.5 million.

In July 2021, Network Rail took over formal ownership of the line from Aggregate Industries, a successor company to Camas, which had been leasing it to the Dartmoor Railway since 1994. It also acquired the northern part of Okehampton station from Devon County Council for £1, leaving the southern side with the council.

The new service started on 20 November 2021, with Great Western Railway running eight trains a day (one every two hours) to Exeter St Davids, with a journey time of around 40 minutes. On weekdays, five trains, including peak-time commuter services, continue to Exeter Central. The frequency has increased to hourly from May 2022, with more trains serving Exeter Central.

Following the reopening in 2021, plans and funding were announced for a new station named Okehampton Interchange east of Okehampton in November 2023. Funding was approved by the government in June 2024 as part of its Levelling-Up policy and the Devon Metro. The station opened on 1 August 2026.

== Route ==
The station buildings at Bow and North Tawton remain as private residences, while Sampford Courtenay and Meldon Viaduct stations are unused. Beyond Meldon, 11 miles (18 km) of the former track bed to Lydford can be followed on foot or cycle along what is now called The Granite Way.

== Passenger volume ==
The reopened Dartmooor Line carried 250,000 people in a little over its first year of operation.

Dartmoor line passengers by year and station
Year (Note: The passenger data covers twelve month periods that start in April.)	Crediton (Note: Crediton station data includes passengers on the Tarka Line.)	Sampford Courtenay (Note: Sampford Courtenay was only open for Sunday services from 2002 to 2019.)	Okehampton (Note: Data for Okehampton is for National Rail passengers only, it does not include heritage railway passengers.)
2002–2003	21,607	Not recorded	Not recorded
2004–2005	22,478	Not recorded	Not recorded
2005–2006	22,550	Not recorded	Not recorded
2006–2007	24,021	Not recorded	Not recorded
2007–2008	27,422	Not recorded	Not recorded
2008–2009	32,344	Not recorded	Not recorded
2009–2010	36,784	Not recorded	Not recorded
2010–2011	44,074	76	3,622
2011–2012	48,978	136	3,526
2012–2013	43,016	150	3,438
2013–2014	50,342	146	3,208
2014–2015	52,492	196	2,984
2015–2016	55,112	130	3,036
2016–2017	58,390	144	5,926
2017–2018	56,006	188	5,000
2018–2019	57,670	186	5,320
2019–2020	66,606	240	6,434
2020–2021	26,306	—	—
2021–2022	84,502		54,904
2022–2023	133,000	—	228,000
2023–2024	162,000	—	315,000
2024-2025	187,194	—	347,920

== Bibliography ==
- Cheeseman, A.J. (1967). The Plymouth, Devonport & South Western Junction Railway. Blandford Forum: Oakwood Press.
- Nicholas, John (1992). The North Devon Line. Sparkford: Oxford Publishing Company. ISBN 0-86093-461-6.
- Thomas, David St John (1981). The West Country. A Regional History of the Railways of Great Britain. Newton Abbott: David & Charles. ISBN 9780715382103.
- Wolmar, Christian (2008). Fire and Steam: How the Railways Transformed Britain. London: Atlantic Books. ISBN 978-1-84354-630-6.
