= Belstone Corner =

Village in Devon, England

Coordinates: 50.76°N 03.95°W

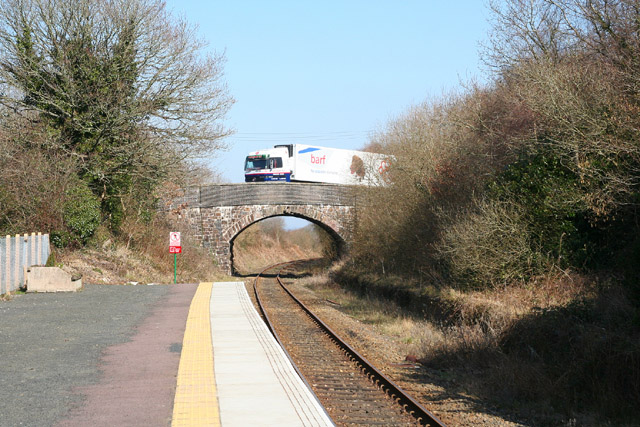
- Sampford Courtenay Railway station

- Location within Devon
- OS grid reference: SX6298
- Civil parish: Sampford Courtenay
- District: West Devon
- Shire county: Devon
- Region: South West
- Country: England
- Sovereign state: United Kingdom
- Post town: OKEHAMPTON
- Postcode district: EX20
- Dialling code: 01837
- Police: Devon and Cornwall
- Fire: Devon and Somerset
- Ambulance: South Western
- UK Parliament: Torridge and West Devon

Belstone Corner is a village in West Devon in the English county of Devon, part of the civil parish of Sampford Courtenay.

The Sampford Courtenay railway station, on the Exeter to Okehampton line, is at Belstone Corner and originally bore this name.
