= Chapelton, Devon =

Hamlet in Devon, England

Coordinates: 51.01°N 4.02°W

Chapelton
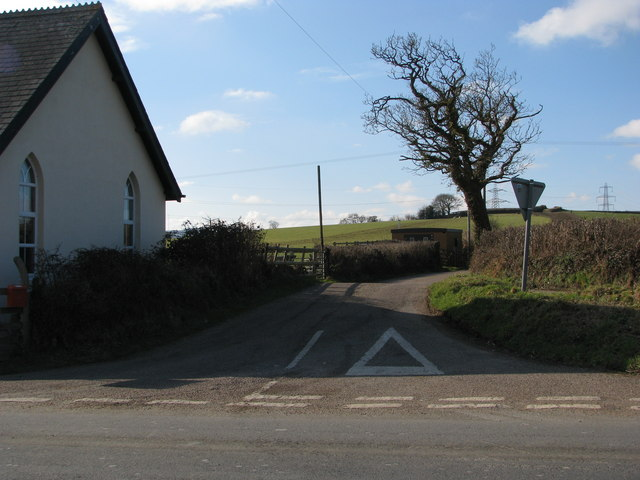
- Road junction at Chapelton

- Location within Devon
- OS grid reference: SS58042609
- Civil parish: Tawstock
- District: North Devon
- Shire county: Devon
- Region: South West
- Country: England
- Sovereign state: United Kingdom
- Post town: BARNSTAPLE
- Postcode district: EX31
- Dialling code: 01271
- Police: Devon and Cornwall
- Fire: Devon and Somerset
- Ambulance: South Western
- UK Parliament: North Devon

Chapelton is a hamlet in Devon. It is located in the civil parish of Tawstock. The hamlet is served by the Chapelton railway station.
