= Okehampton railway station =

Railway station in Devon, England

Okehampton
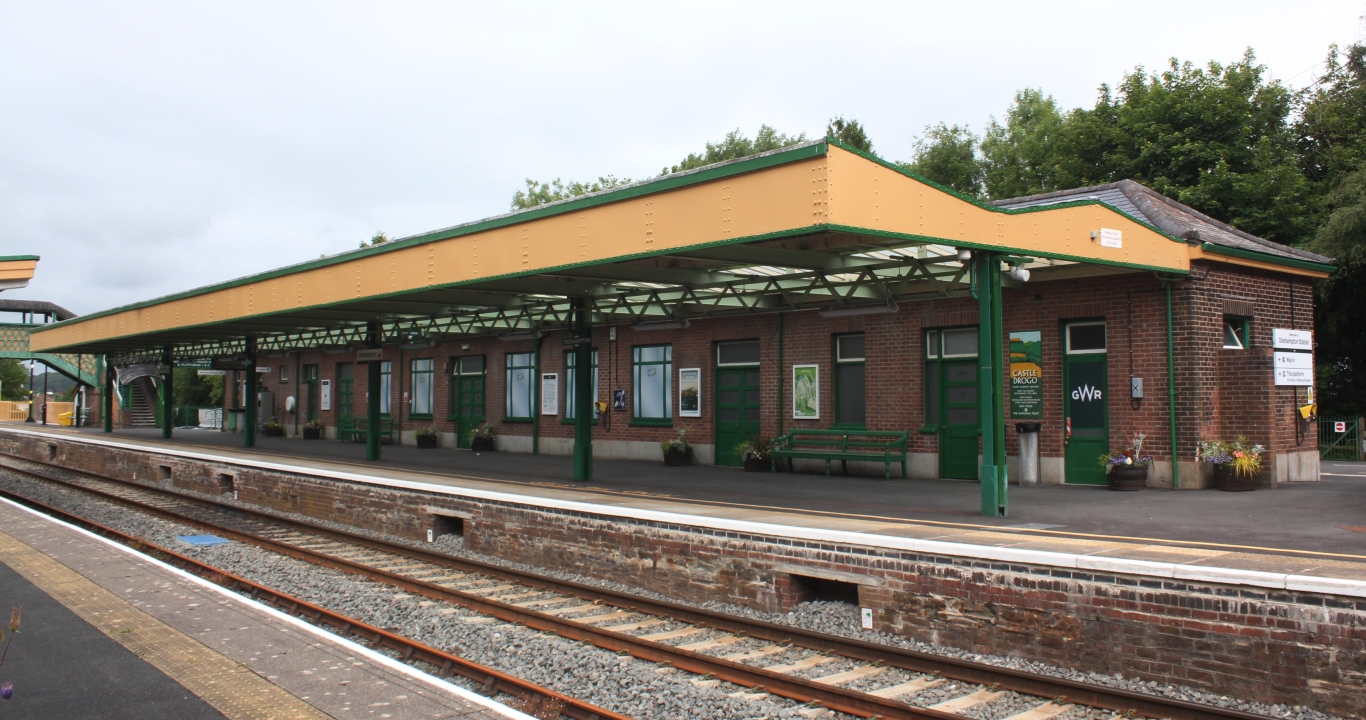
- Okehampton station in 2022

General information
- Location: Okehampton, West Devon, Devon; England
- Coordinates: 50.7325°N 3.9964°W
- Grid reference: SX592944
- Manager: Great Western Railway
- Platforms: 3 (Only 1 in use)

Other information
- Station code: OKE

History
- Original company: London and South Western Railway
- Post-grouping: Southern Railway

Key dates
- 1871: Opened
- 1972: Closed
- 1997: Heritage services start
- 2019: Heritage services end
- 2021: National rail services resume

Passengers
- 2019/20: ▲6,434
- 2021/22: ▲54,904
- 2022/23: ▲0.228 million
- 2023/24: ▲0.315 million
- 2024/25: ▲0.348 million
Location
Notes
- Passenger statistics from the Office of Rail and Road

Okehampton railway station is a terminus railway station on the Dartmoor line serving the town of Okehampton in Devon, England. The station closed to regular traffic in 1972, but heritage and occasional mainline services ran from 1997 to 2019. Regular railway services resumed in November 2021.

== History ==
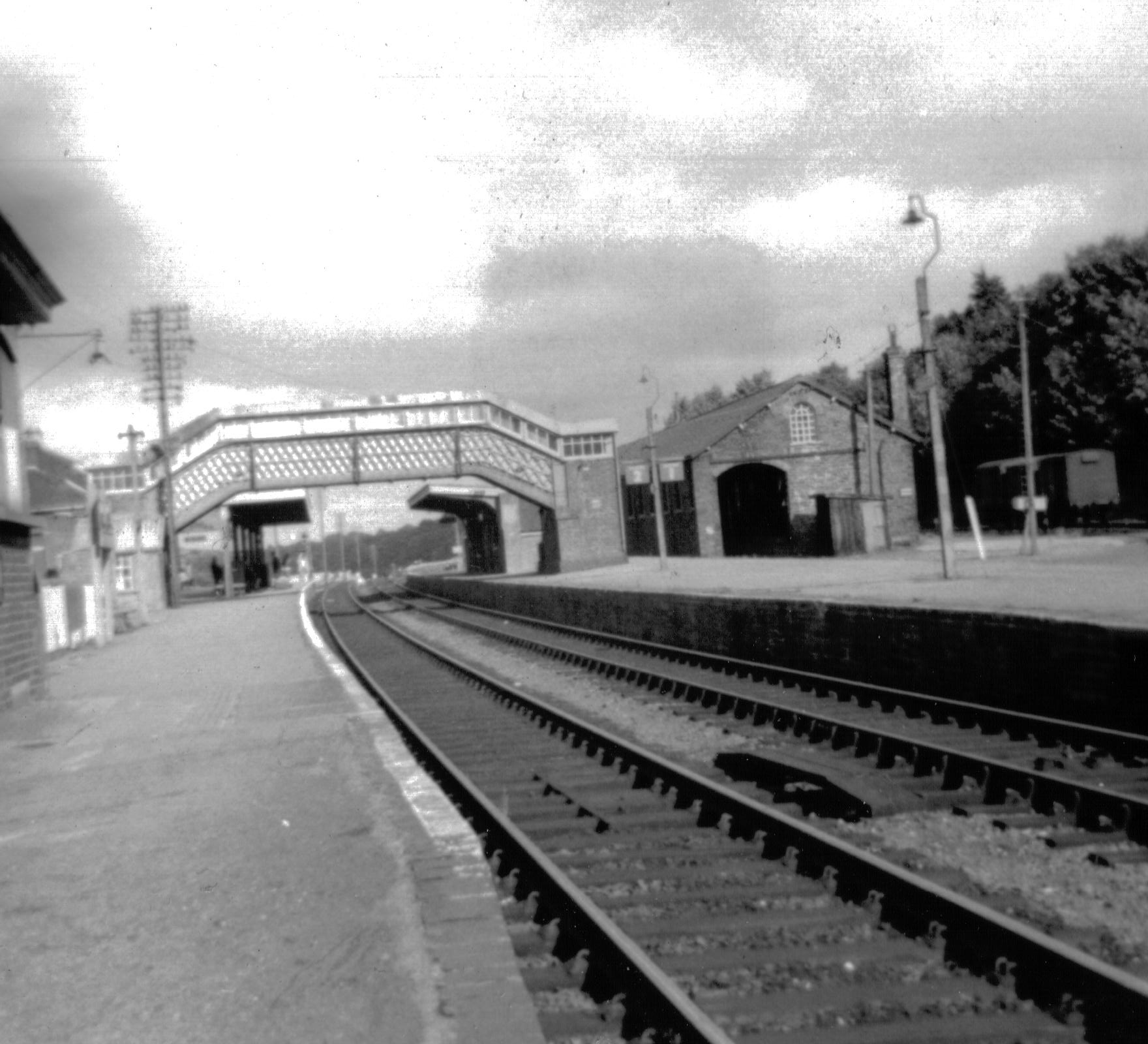
Okehampton station in 1970.

The station opened in 1871 when the London and South Western Railway (LSWR) extended its line from Sampford Courtenay. Services were extended further west to Lydford with the inauguration of Meldon Viaduct in 1874. Constructed to rival the South Devon Railway route to Plymouth, the completion of the LSWR's route to Plymouth saw Okehampton become an important junction with lines to Padstow and Bude as well as Plymouth. Boat trains carrying passengers from ocean liners calling at Stonehouse Pool, Plymouth and prestige services such as the Atlantic Coast Express and Devon Belle all used the route. From 1960 to 1964 it was the terminus of a car-carrying train from Surbiton.

With the publication of the Beeching Report in 1963, the line to Bude was put forward for closure as was part of the Exeter to Plymouth Line which was to be cut back to Okehampton. It was said that at the time Okehampton had about 50 regular users per day and a handful of season ticket holders. The line westwards closed in May 1968.

The line partially survived, however, for the purposes of freight thanks to the activities of the British Rail ballast quarry at Meldon, three miles from Okehampton, which had an output of 300,000 tons per year. The line to the quarry closed in 2011.

=== 1997 to 2019 ===
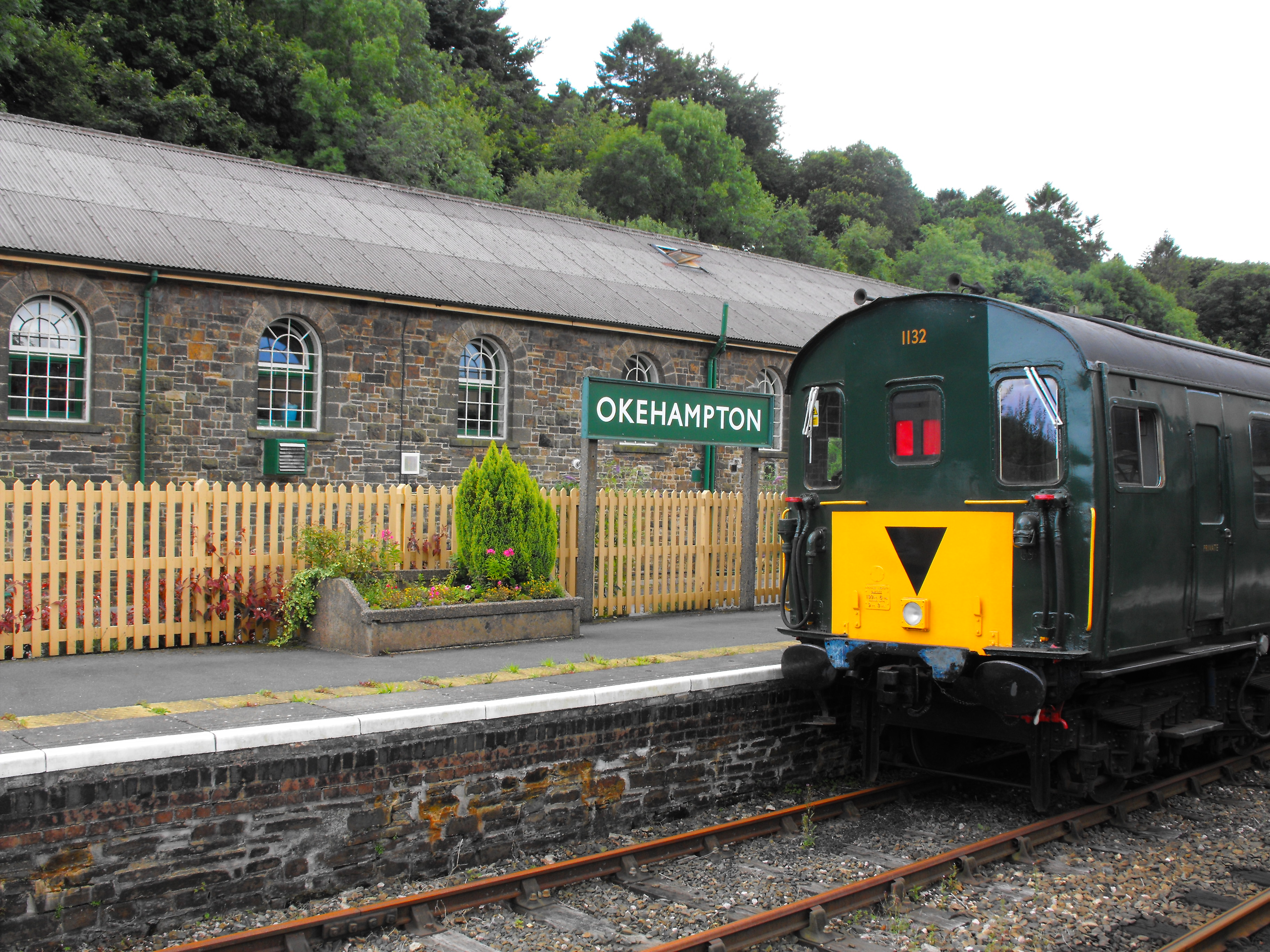
A heritage train operated by a Class 205 in 2009

As part of a local partnership scheme initiated and led by Devon County Council, Okehampton station was re-opened in 1997 and a youth hostel was opened in the old goods shed, providing an activity centre as well. The Dartmoor Railway operated heritage passenger services from the station, running to Sampford Courtenay and Meldon. A summer Sunday service from Exeter to Okehampton operated as part of the Dartmoor Sunday Rover network.

The station building, which was used by Devon Training for Skills after 1972, was restored and reopened incorporating an independently owned model shop and café. After temporary closure during a change in railway ownership in 2008, the cafe was reopened by the Friends of Dartmoor Railway but closed in 2019. A craft centre previously operated on one of the platforms. This now houses a small exhibition and museum showing the history of the railway and station.

British American Railway Services, a new company created by Iowa Pacific Holdings of Chicago, became the owner of the Dartmoor Railway on 4 September 2008. The company said it would develop freight, passenger and tourist services on the railway. This was never achieved. The last heritage service operated on 24 December 2019.

=== 2021 reopening ===
In November 2017, the government included the reopening of the line from Exeter to Okehampton as part of its plans to expand the network. Chris Grayling, the secretary of state for transport, wrote to local MPs in January 2018 to inform them of the details.

In January 2020, British American Railway Services announced that due to financial problems, it intended to sell all its British operations, including the Dartmoor Railway. The United Kingdom government's November 2020 Spending Review included a commitment to restore passenger services and £40 million was allocated for reopening the Dartmoor line in the March 2021 government budget.

It was announced on 19 March 2021 that Okehampton station would reopen with regular services by the end of the year, funded as part of the government's Restoring Your Railway programme. Ownership of the northern half (platform 3) of the station was transferred from Devon County Council to Network Rail in July 2021 for £1. The council retains control of the rest of the station (platforms 1 and 2) and is responsible for maintenance of the footbridge. The station and the line reopened on 20 November 2021 with a train every two hours and was increased to hourly in May 2022.

In January 2024 Storm Henk blew the roof off the station footbridge resulting the closure of the station.

Shortly after the Okehampton railway station was reopened there were plans for a new Okehampton Interchange station. Services called at this new station from 1 August 2026.

== Facilities ==
Although Okehampton is not a staffed station it has a ticket machine, help point, public address system, information screens, CCTV and Wi-Fi. In May 2021, GWR said they would work with the local community to add new facilities including a cafe, Dartmoor National Park visitor centre, a shop, and toilets.

== Services ==
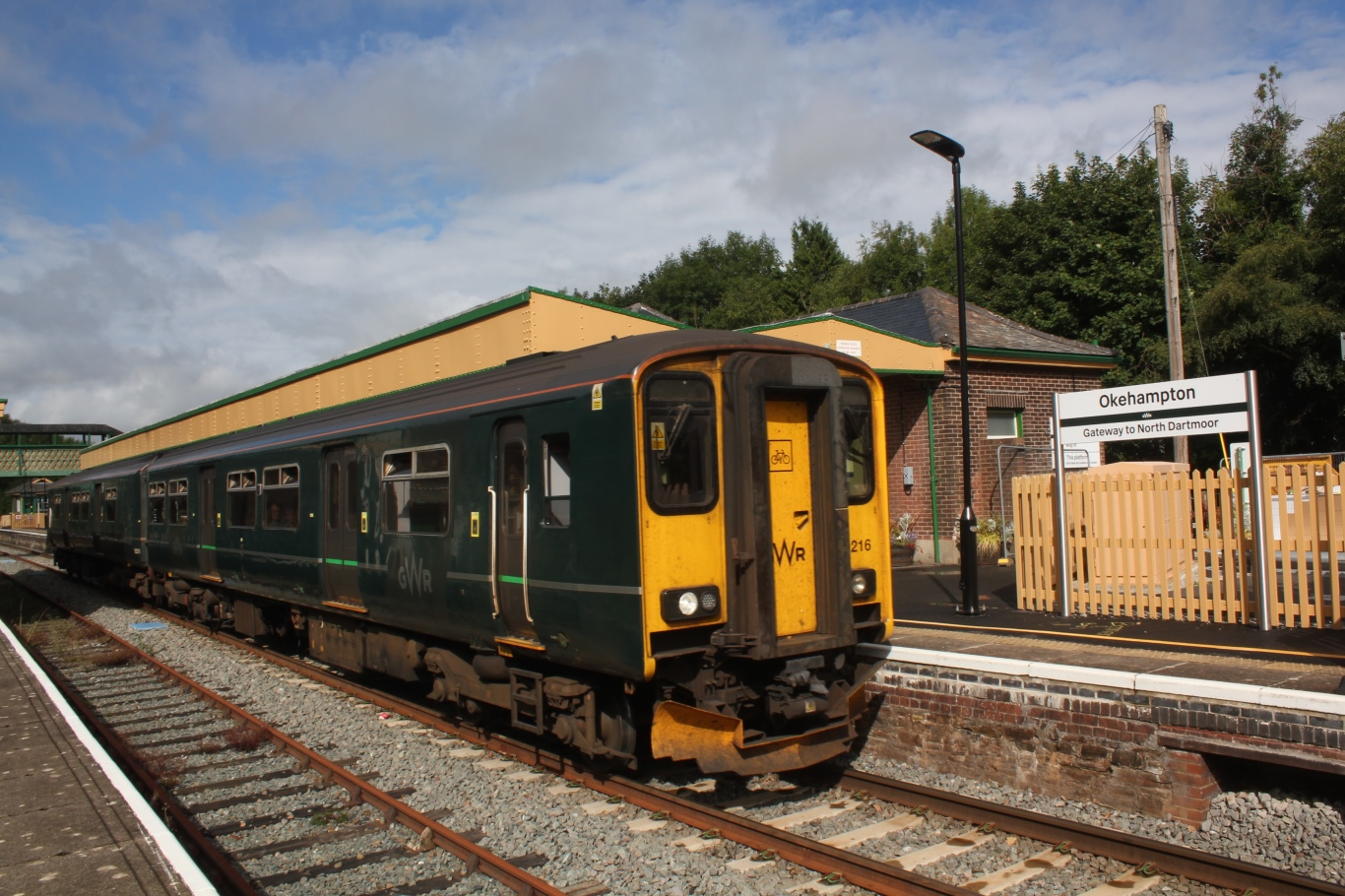
A GWR Class 150 with an Okehampton to Exeter service

All services at Okehampton are operated by Great Western Railway. The service is one train per hour to Exeter St Davids, with most services continuing to Exeter Central.

Preceding station	National Rail	Following station
Terminus	Great Western Railway Dartmoor Line	Okehampton Interchange towards Exeter Central
Disused railways
Maddaford Moor Halt	British Rail Western Region Bude Branch	Terminus
Bridestowe	British Rail Western Region Exeter to Plymouth Line	Sampford Courtenay
Preceding station	Heritage railways	Following station
Meldon Viaduct Terminus	Dartmoor Railway 1997–2019	Sampford Courtenay Terminus

== Future ==
Both Railfuture and Anthony Steen (former MP for Totnes) have proposed the reinstatement of the line between Okehampton and Bere Alston, thereby reconnecting the station with Plymouth. The reopening of the link would restore the continuous circuit of railway linking the towns around Dartmoor. On 18 March 2008, Devon County Council backed a separate proposal by developers Kilbride Community Rail to construct 750 houses in Tavistock that included reopening part of this route from Bere Alston to a new railway station in Tavistock.

The line's reopening would provide an alternative route to Plymouth and the Cornish Main Line in the event of engineering work or storms on the sea wall near Dawlish, although that would entail a reversal by GWR trains at Exeter St Davids and at Plymouth for all trains continuing to Cornwall. Reopening the line would also maintain rail links in the long-term should the line around Dawlish succumb to the sea, as it did on 5 February 2014.

== Connections ==
The Devon Coast to Coast Cycleway Route 27 created by Sustrans passes the station.

A dedicated service 118 rail link bus service links Okehampton station with the town centre and Tavistock. It is timed to connect with train services at the station.
