= Meldon Quarry =

Granite quarry in Devon, England

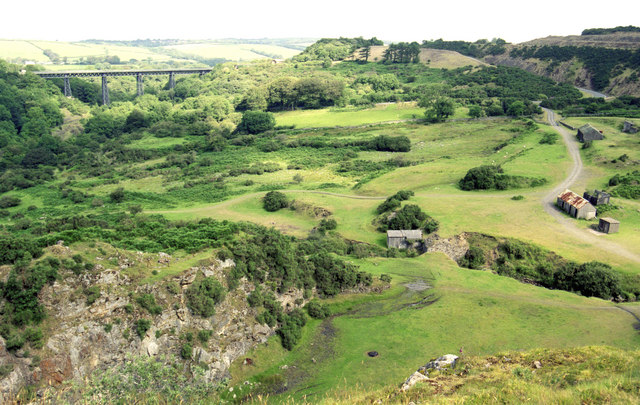
Meldon quarry site in 2002 with the viaduct in the background

Meldon Quarry is a granite quarry in Devon, England. It is at the northern edge of Dartmoor, about 2 miles SW of Okehampton. It was developed from 1897 to supply track ballast and other stone products for the London and South Western Railway (LSWR) and later for British Rail. It was privatised in 1994.

== Track ballast ==
A small quarry was started to supply local railway requirements in 1874, concurrent with the opening of the LSWR's railway extension from Okehampton to Lydford, part of its route from Exeter to Plymouth on which the quarry lies.

The quarry was considerably developed in 1897 to provide the majority of the track ballast requirements of the LSWR, which at the time amounted to about 100,000 tons per annum. The geology is such that the ballast is harder, and therefore more long-lasting, than stone available in the more easterly parts of the system. The quarry was further extended in 1902, eventually reaching 200 acres (80 hectares). Further developed over the years, by 1953 it was producing 340,000 tons annually. An internal tramway of short and movable 2-foot (610 mm) gauge tramways was provided.

After nationalisation, the ballast quality was considered to be superior to the more conveniently available limestones, but the cost of haulage from the westerly location counted against it, and in the 1980s it proved commercially viable to bring good quality stone from Scotland by coastal shipping to Tilbury, substituting for some of the Meldon output.

As part of the process of privatising British Rail, the quarry operation was sold to ECC Quarries Ltd. on 4 March 1994; at that time the railway from Coleford Junction only served the quarry, and it was sold too.

== Staff platform ==
Because of the remote location, a staff passenger platform was provided. It is described at Meldon Quarry railway station.

== Locomotives ==
Positioning and marshalling of a large flow of mineral wagons was achieved by horse power at first, but in 1927 a Manning Wardle 0-4-0ST locomotive was provided. It had been built for the South Eastern Railway in 1881 and had worked at Folkestone Harbour. It was numbered 313 but became service locomotive 225S at Medlon. It was working there until 1938.

A replacement locomotive was required, and after trials with a B4 0-4-0T and an O2 0-4-4T, a SECR class T 0-6-0T no 1607 became the regular power unit, being renumbered 500S; it worked there from September 1938 until 1948.

After a period with locomotives being lent temporarily, a G6 class 0-6-0T no 72 of the former LSWR took over, being renumbered DS3152 and working from November 1949 until July 1960. Another G6 took over then: no. 30238, renumbered DS682 worked there until December 1962. This was followed by USA 0-6-0T no. DS234, which worked at the quarry from then until August 1966, when it was replaced by another of that class, 30064, which stayed until October 1966 when it was returned to the Southern Region. It was the last active steam loco on the Western Region of British Railways. After that class 08 diesel shunters provided the power.

== Protected area ==
Meldon Quarry is a Site of Special Scientific Interest (SSSI) because of the exposures from rocks from the Variscan Orogeny of the Carboniferous period. The rocks here show complex folds and faults in cherts, siliceous shales and tuffs. Some of the land within this protected area is owned by the Duchy of Cornwall.
