= Meldon, Devon =

Hamlet in Devon, England

Coordinates: 50.7°N 4.05°W

Meldon
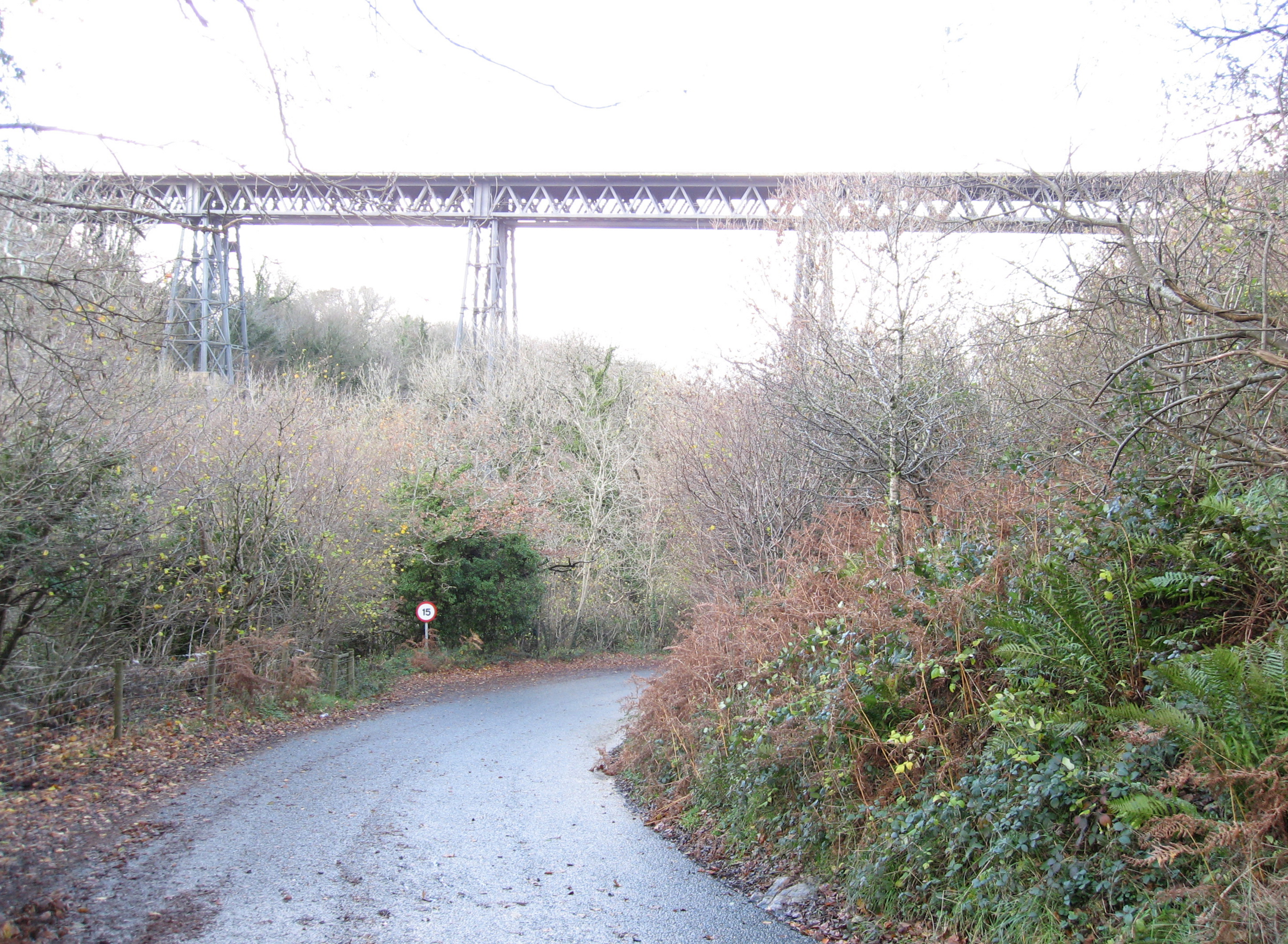
- Meldon Viaduct from the quarry road

- Location within Devon
- OS grid reference: SX5592
- Civil parish: Okehampton Hamlets
- District: West Devon
- Shire county: Devon
- Region: South West
- Country: England
- Sovereign state: United Kingdom
- Post town: OKEHAMPTON
- Postcode district: EX20
- Dialling code: 01837
- Police: Devon and Cornwall
- Fire: Devon and Somerset
- Ambulance: South Western
- UK Parliament: Torridge and West Devon

Meldon is a hamlet in West Devon, on the edge of Dartmoor in Devon, England. It is 4 km south-west of Okehampton. Its main features are the Meldon Quarry and Meldon Reservoir and the nearby Meldon Viaduct.

== Quarries ==
Granite is still extracted from Meldon Quarry. The now disused Meldon Aplite Quarry has been designated as a Site of Special Scientific Interest because of its exposures of aplite and other rocks.

The Dartmoor Railway terminates at Meldon Quarry; the former continuation of the line to Tavistock and Plymouth continues as a cycle path. The former railway line crosses the West Okement River on the Meldon Viaduct just before reaching the quarry from the west.

== Reservoir ==
The Meldon Reservoir was formed by damming the West Okement River. It is about 1.2 km long and 300 metres wide, and extends from the West Okement valley into a small side valley.

== Firing range ==
Immediately to the south-east is the area of the Okehampton military firing range, which is sometimes closed to the public. At other times, a footpath along the west side of the reservoir can be used to access the open moor.

== Civil parish ==
In 1850, the civil parish of Oakhampton, or Okehampton, consisted of 9,552 acres (38.66 km^{2}) of land, which encompassed several villages including Meldon. The hamlet is now part of the civil parish of Okehampton Hamlets.

== See also ==
- Rail trail
