= Exeter Central railway station =

Railway station in Devon, England

Exeter Central
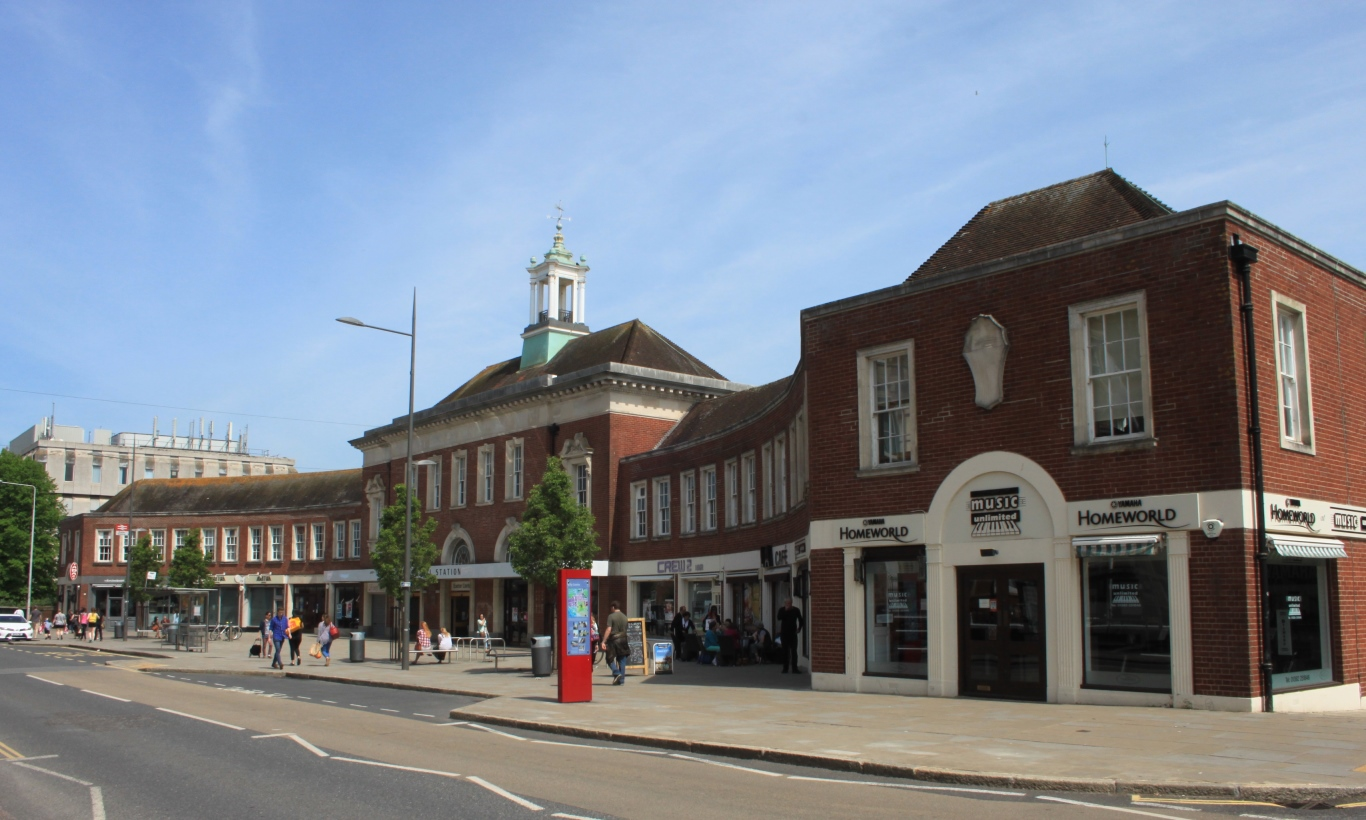
- The entrance from Queen Street

General information
- Location: Queen Street; Exeter, Devon; England
- Coordinates: 50.7264°N 3.53300°W
- Grid reference: SX918930
- Manager: Great Western Railway
- Platforms: 3
- Train operators: Great Western Railway; South Western Railway
- Bus routes: 20
- Bus stands: 4
- Bus operators: Stagecoach South West; Dartline; Country Bus; MD Coaches

Other information
- Station code: EXC
- Classification: DfT category C1

History
- Original company: London and South Western Railway
- Post-grouping: Southern Railway

Key dates
- 1860: Opened as 'Exeter Queen Street'
- 1933: Rebuilt and renamed 'Exeter Central'

Passengers
- 2021/22: ▲2.244 million
- Interchange: ▲0.177 million
- 2022–2023: ▲2.608 million
- Interchange: ▲0.314 million
- 2023–2024: ▲2.783 million
- Interchange: ▼0.274 million
- 2024–2025: ▲2.962 million
- Interchange: ▲0.330 million
- 2025–2026: ▲2.998 million
- Interchange: ▼0.306 million

Listed Building – Grade II
- Feature: Exeter Central Station
- Designated: 24 July 2026
- Reference no.: 1495589
Location

Exeter Central railway station is the most central of the stations in the city of Exeter, Devon, England. It is the second busiest of the city's stations after Exeter St Davids.

Exeter Central is 171 miles 30 chains (275.8 km; 171.38 mi) from London Waterloo. Great Western Railway manages the station and operates local train services but South Western Railway provides the service to London.

From 1860, when it was opened by the London and South Western Railway, until 1933, when it was rebuilt, it was known as Exeter Queen Street. The 1933 building is Grade II-listed.

== History ==
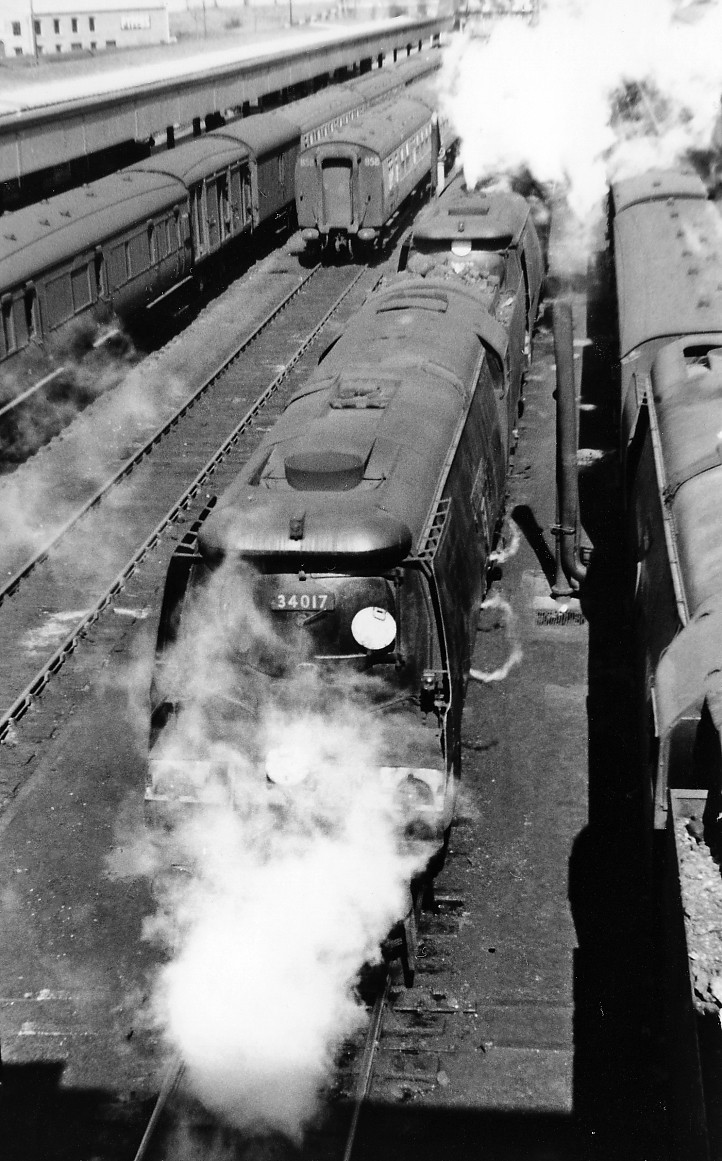
There were two sidings between the through platforms until 1969 which were used by spare carriages and locomotives

The London and South Western Railway (LSWR) opened its Exeter Extension from Yeovil Junction on 19 July 1860 and its station at Queen Street in the city centre became the terminus for services from London Waterloo station, known then as Exeter Queen Street station. From 1 May 1861 it was also the terminus for trains on the new Exeter and Exmouth Railway. This was also operated by the LSWR but the physical junction between the two lines was at Exmouth Junction, 1 mile 3 chains (1.7 km; 1.04 mi) east of Queen Street.

The final piece of the LSWR's network in Exeter was opened on 1 February 1862 when a steep line descended from the west end of Queen Street station to reach the Bristol and Exeter Railway's station at Exeter St Davids which had been opened in 1844. Here the LSWR connected with the Exeter and Crediton Railway and over that line eventually reached Plymouth, Padstow, Bude, and Ilfracombe Most trains to these destinations changed locomotives at Queen Street and many had carriages added or removed too. A locomotive shed was situated at the station but it was replaced by a new maintenance depot at Exmouth Junction in 1887. The space was later used for enlarged carriage sidings; further carriage sidings were situated at the west end of the station beyond the Queen Street bridge.

The original station had just a single platform with two tracks which were covered by a large train shed. A second platform and train shed was added in 1874 and two sidings were laid to give a total of four tracks between the platforms. The LSWR became a part of the Southern Railway (SR) in 1923 and two years later the eastbound platform was lengthened from 600 feet (180 m) to 1,210 feet (370 m), taking it beyond the New North Road bridge at the east end of the station. A fire damaged the original wooden buildings on the westbound platform in 1927 and work on rebuilding the station started in 1931. The train sheds were demolished and new brick buildings were officially opened on 1 July 1933 when the station was renamed Exeter Central. At this time there were four platform tracks – east-facing terminal platforms 1 and 4 and through platforms 2 and 3 – and two additional through lines in the centre of the station.

On 1 January 1948 the SR was nationalised to become the Southern Region of British Railways but in 1963 the Southern Region lines west of Salisbury were transferred to the Western Region and by 1967 services from London Waterloo were reduced with very few running beyond Exeter St Davids. The entrance at the east end of the station from New North Road was closed in 1966. Goods yards had been provided on the north side of the line, both behind the eastbound platform and also on the other side of the Queen Street bridge. General goods traffic was withdrawn on 4 December 1967 but cement traffic continued until January 1980. The eastbound through line (the 'up through') was taken out of use on 9 November 1969, as was the 'down through' on 13 October 1984.

The entrance from New North Road was reopened on 2 July 1984, and later a new ramped footbridge was installed to give direct access from there to the east end of both platforms. The ticket office was moved into a smaller space while the original ticket office was rented out as a commercial space until 2012 when the original ticket office was reopened. New ticket gates were installed at the same time and the waiting rooms improved and the street outside the main entrance on Queen Street redeveloped. A further redevelopment was completed in 2026. This included moving the ticket gates and customer assistance area into a newly enlarged concourse space near the ticket office to allow more gates than had been possible in the previous location in the passageway to the footbridge.

The station buildings, including the footbridge, were awarded Grade II listed status by Historic England on 24 July 2026.

=== Locomotive shed ===
The three-track locomotive shed was sited to the east of the station on the south side of the line. The original 170-foot (52 m) shed was extended to 234 feet (71 m) in 1872 and further modernised facilities were brought into use five years later. Despite these alterations the space was too small to handle all the locomotives working in and out of the station so a new maintenance depot was opened at Exmouth Junction in 1887. A few sidings and the turntable was retained at Queen Street. This turntable was 42 feet (13 m) long but in 1888 it was replaced by a 50 feet (15 m) example.

=== Signalling ===
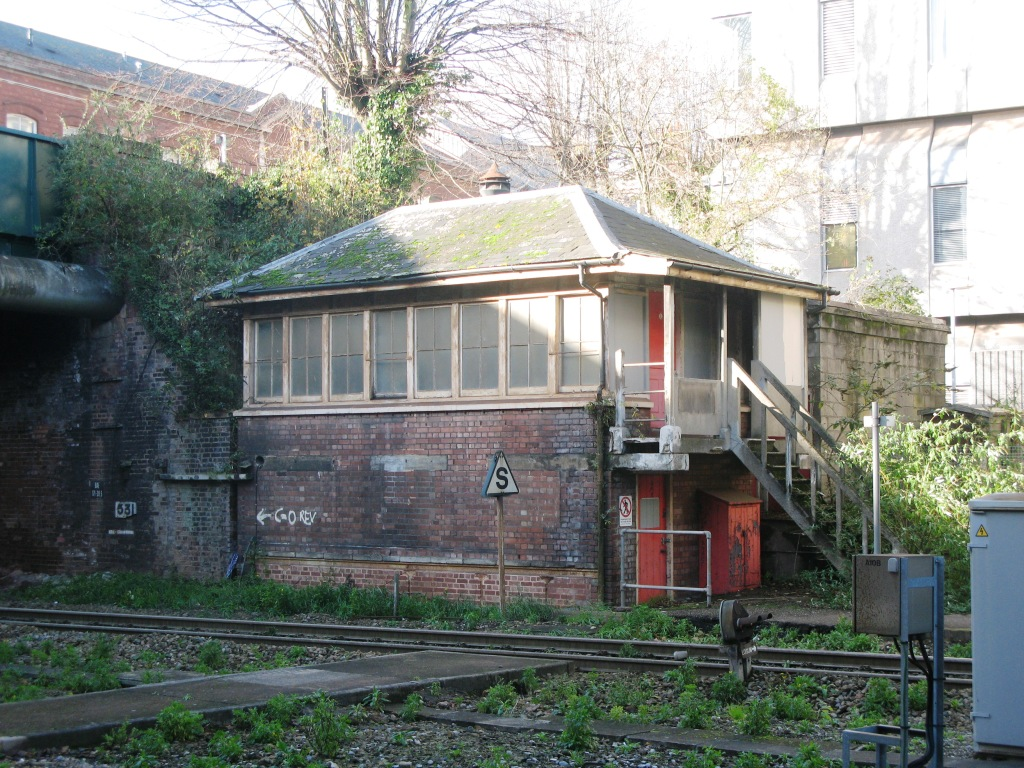
Exeter Central B signal box was in use from 1925 to 1970

In the 1860s there was just a single track to the East but two tracks to the West; all the points and signals were operated on the ground. The first signal boxes were brought into use in 1875 when three controlled the extensive layout: 'Queen Street A' and 'Queen Street B' at the east end of the station, with 'Queen Street C' situated at the west end between the two platforms. These signal boxes were all closed in the 1920s. The C box was replaced by a new one at the west end of the eastbound platform on 13 September 1925. The A and B boxes were replaced by a new, larger box on the north side of the line beyond the New North Road bridge on 15 November 1927. This was named 'Queen Street A' and the C box was renamed 'Queen Street B'; six years later they were renamed again as 'Exeter Central A' and 'Exeter Central B'.

The B box was closed on 23 February 1970 and the A box was then renamed just 'Exeter Central'. This too closed on 6 May 1985 when control was transferred to the new panel signal box at St Davids. With this change came resignalling; the westbound platform 2 was signalled for trains to run in either direction as was the westbound line to St Davids. The signals are interlocked so that trains cannot start from either St Davids or Central until their route is clear right through to their platform at the other station. This feature is replicated from the days of steam locomotives with less power or brakes than today's diesels when it was undesirable for trains to come to a stand on this steeply graded section of line.

== Description and facilities ==
The main entrance to Exeter Central is on Queen Street. There is a ticket office and ticket machines, a small car park, cycle storage, and toilets. All platforms have step-free access. It is 170 mi 30 ch (274.2 km; 170.38 mi) from London Waterloo.

The station facilities are in a crescent-shaped brick building that is described by Historic England as 'Wren revival style with some Moderne detailing'. It presents two storeys to the street but has four storeys behind where the platforms are below street level. The ticket office is at street level while the upper storey contains offices. A footbridge, lifts and stairs connect the ticket office with the platforms. The curving front of the station is completed by two wings of shops. There are two long platforms and a seldom-used east facing bay platform on the south side of the main platform. The old 'Exeter Central B' signal box is at the west end of the eastbound platform, although it has not been used since 1970.

== Passengers ==
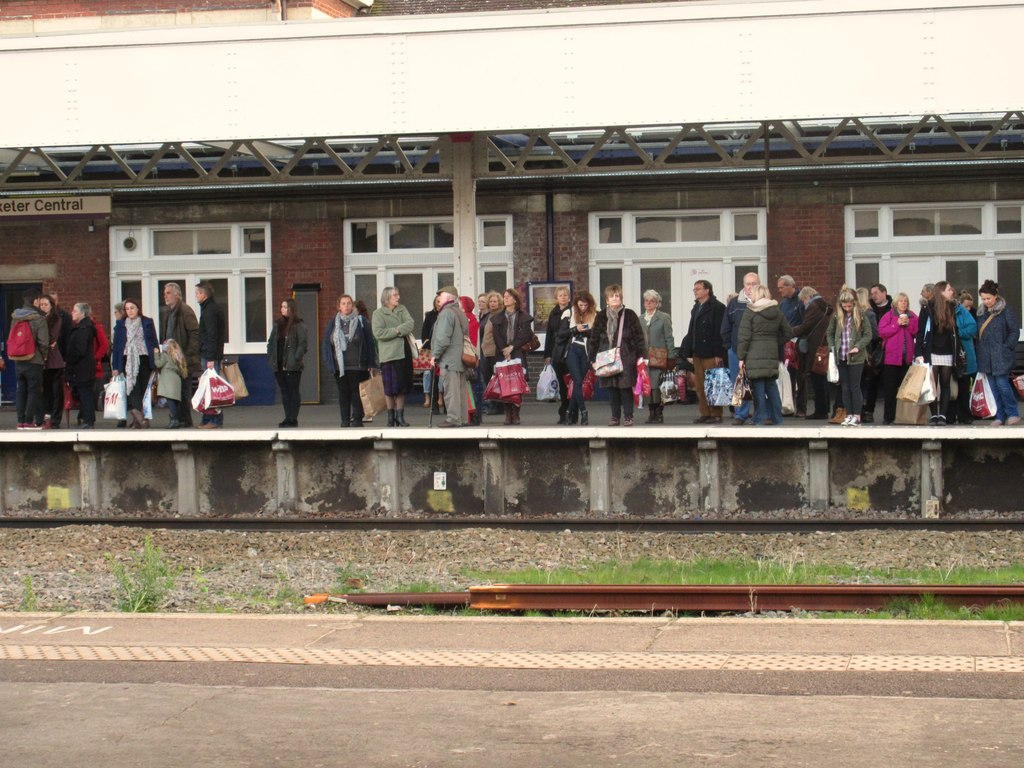
Passengers at Exeter Central

The number of passengers starting or finishing their journeys at Exeter Central each year in the 2000s totalled about 1,000,000 but had reached 2,000,000 by 2014. In the accounting year 2025–2026 they amounted to 2,998,160 with interchanges estimated at 305,846.

Passengers by year
Year (Note: The passenger data covers twelve month periods that start in April.)	Entries and exits	Interchanges
1997–1998	961,378	No data
1998–1999	924,744	No data
1999–2000	1,043,249	12,717
2000–2001	1,031,718	13,211
2001–2002	965,226	12,227
2002–2003	1,077,779	No data
2003–2004	No data	No data
2004–2005	1,045,697	20,142
2005–2006	1,081,171	26,646
2006–2007	1,292,493	26,423
2007–2008	1,385,318	25,897
2008–2009	1,514,418	32,905
2009–2010	1,512,286	37,824
2010–2011	1,661,484	36,280
2011–2012	1,824,444	58,089
2012–2013	1,871,514	167,241
2013–2014	1,943,070	169,949
2014–2015	2,343,636	114,325
2015–2016	2,433,006	123,077
2016–2017	2,566,082	121,498
2017–2018	2,607,502	141,732
2018–2019	2,532,450	139,259
2019–2020	2,536,316	179,174
2020–2021 (Note: Passenger numbers were reduced during 2020 due to the COVID-19 pandemic in the United Kingdom.)	946,172	94,997
2021–2022	2,244,104	176,654
2022–2023 (Note: Through services from the Dartmoor Line started in May 2022.)	2,608,384	314,455
2023–2024	2,783,330	273,621
2024–2025	2,962,450	329,880
2025–2026	2,998,160	305,846

== Services ==
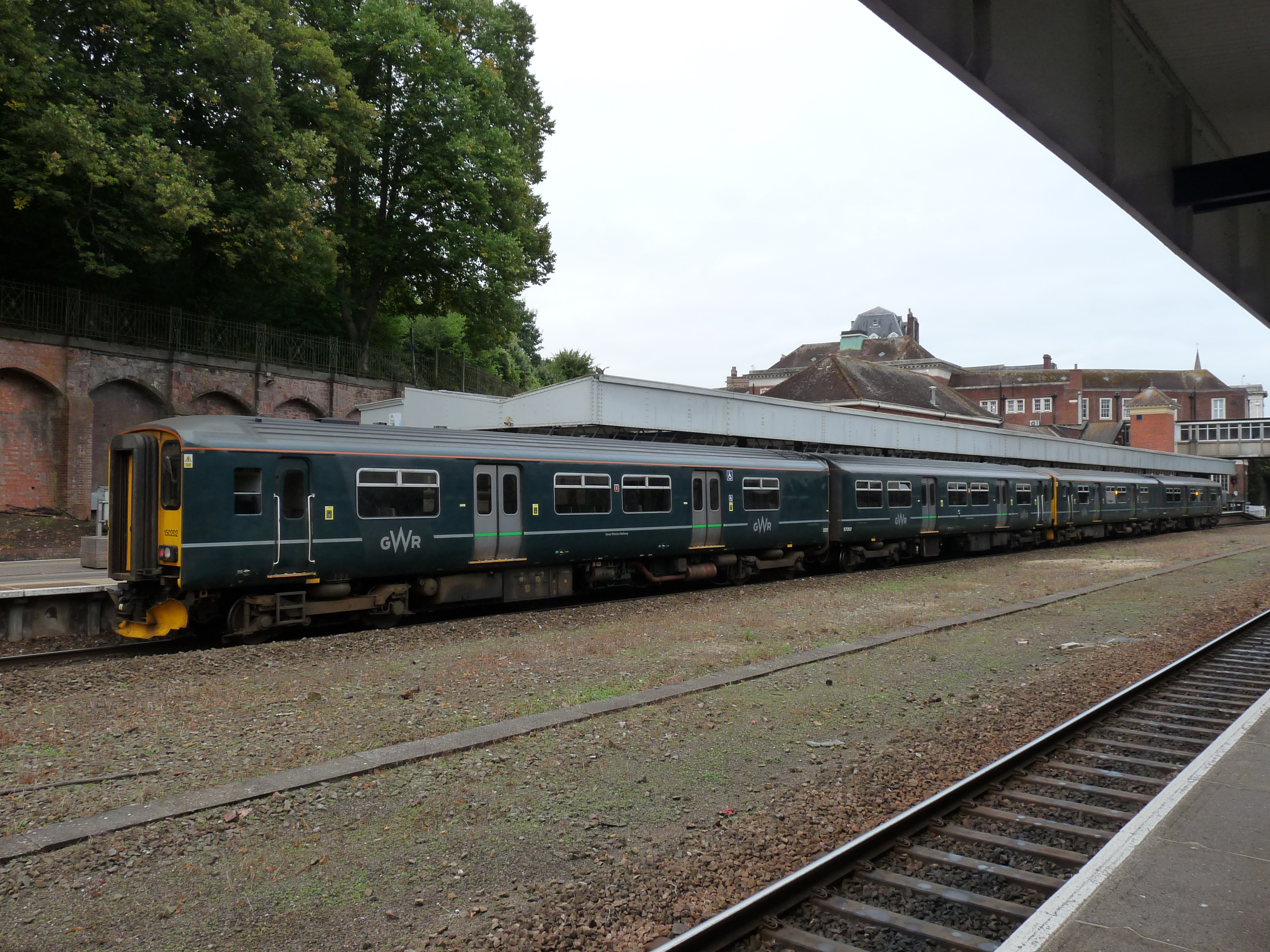
A GWR service at the station

Exeter Central is served by hourly trains on the West of England line operated by South Western Railway (SWR) from London Waterloo station to Exeter St Davids.

Local services are provided by Great Western Railway (GWR) on three routes. They operate twice an hour through most of the week on the Avocet Line from Exmouth to Exeter St Davids (from where they continue to Paignton). Further trains operate, generally once an hour, on both the Tarka Line to Barnstaple and on the Dartmoor Line to Okehampton. The SWR and GWR services combine to give up to five trains per hour each way between Exeter Central and Exeter St Davids.

Preceding station	National Rail	Following station
Pinhoe	South Western Railway (West of England line)	Exeter St Davids
St James Park	Great Western Railway (Avocet Line)	Exeter St Davids
Terminus	Great Western Railway (Tarka Line, Dartmoor Line)	Exeter St Davids

== See also ==
- Southern Railway routes west of Salisbury
