= Coleford, Devon =

Hamlet in Devon, England

Coordinates: 50°47′47″N 3°44′38″W

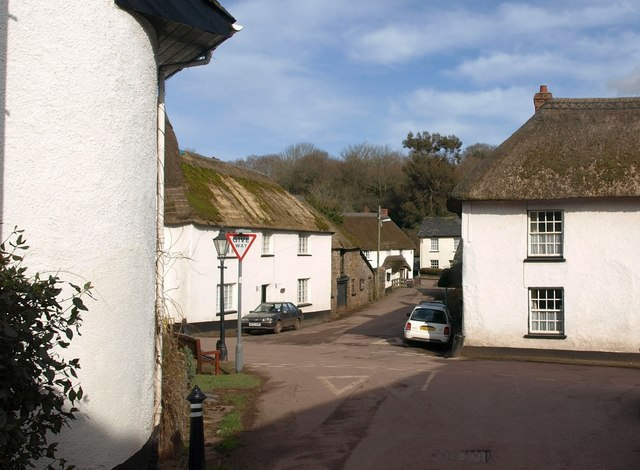
Coleford

Coleford is a small hamlet in Mid-Devon, England. It includes a pub, The New Inn with their resident parrot of over 40 years Captain, and also has a park.

Coleford Junction at nearby Penstone is the place where the Tarka Line from Crediton to Barnstaple splits from the later Dartmoor line to Okehampton.

== History ==
Charles I came through Coleford on 27 July 1644 on his way to Bow, where he spent a night during the English Civil War. At that time Coleford village was on the main highway from Cornwall to Devon. There is a tradition that the King reviewed his horse troop, from the "Porched House", a building which dates from this time.

Henry Kingsley's novel The Recollections of Geoffry Hamlyn is set partly in the village.
