= Eggesford railway station =

Railway station in Devon, England

Eggesford
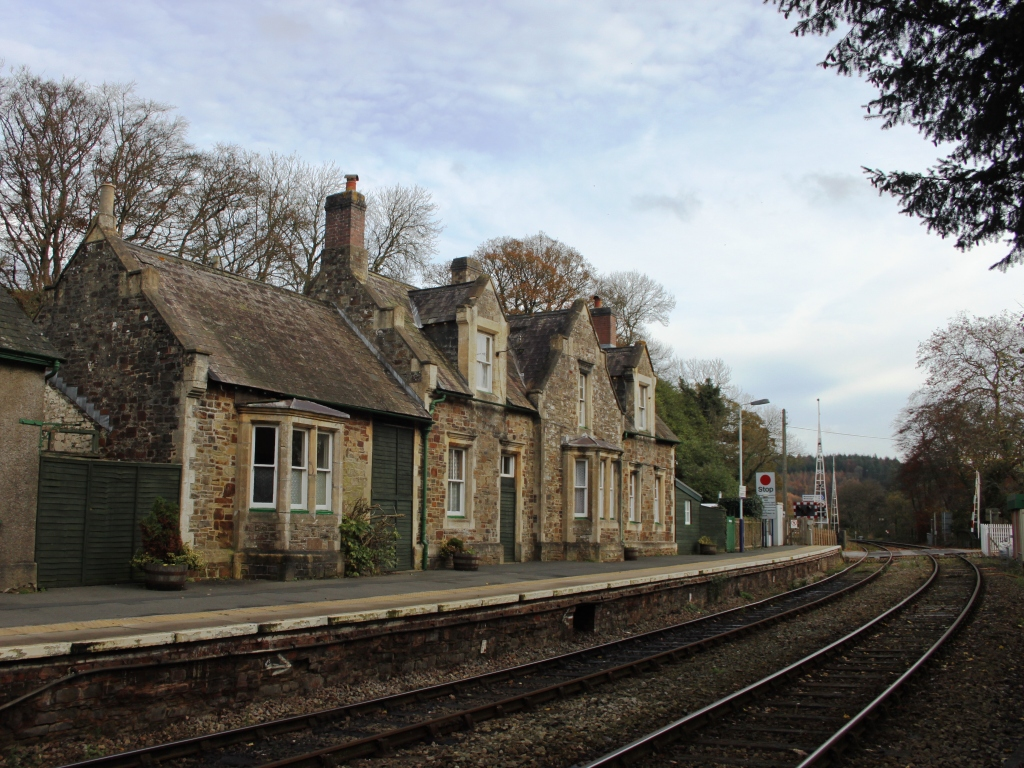
- The station viewed from northbound platform

General information
- Location: Chawleigh, Mid Devon; England
- Coordinates: 50.8878°N 3.87525°W
- Grid reference: SS682114
- Manager: Great Western Railway
- Platforms: 2

Other information
- Station code: EGG
- Classification: DfT category F2

History
- Original company: North Devon Railway
- Pre-grouping: London and South Western Railway
- Post-grouping: Southern Railway

Key dates
- Opened: 1854

Passengers
- 2021/22: ▲33,548
- 2022/23: ▲43,722
- 2023/24: ▲44,600
- 2024/25: ▲52,658
- 2025/26: ▼47,328

Listed Building – Grade II
- Feature: Eggesford Station
- Designated: 19 February 1986
- Reference no.: 1197092
Location
Notes
- Passenger statistics from the Office of Rail and Road

Eggesford railway station is a rural station in Devon, England, serving Eggesford, the town of Chulmleigh and surrounding villages. Despite its name, the station is in the neighbouring civil parish of Chawleigh. It is on the Tarka Line to Barnstaple, 22 miles 27 chains (35.9 km) from Exeter Central at milepost 193.75 from London Waterloo.

== History ==
The station was opened by the North Devon Railway on 1 August 1854, taking its name from Eggesford House, seat of the Earl of Portsmouth who was a supporter of the railway. Although there was a passing loop it only had a single platform on the north side of the line but a second platform was eventually added. A signal box was provided in 1873 on the second platform. The platform was damaged and the signal box subsided when the River Taw flooded on 21 November 1967. The loop was taken out of use until the platform could be repaired and a new signal box opened on 28 September 1969.

A goods yard was provided at the Barnstaple end of the original platform. This was equipped with a crane and there was a small oil storage depot. Cattle markets were held in the yard from time to time.

The line between Copplestone and Umberleigh has always been single so loops such as Eggesford were necessary for trains to pass. In British Railways days the summer Saturday Atlantic Coast Express 11.00 Waterloo to Ilfracombe made its only stop between Exeter and Barnstaple at Eggesford.

The goods yard closed on 4 January 1965 and the signal box was closed on 1 December 1987.

Both platforms were extended by 100 feet (30 m) and new lighting installed in April 2021.

== Description ==
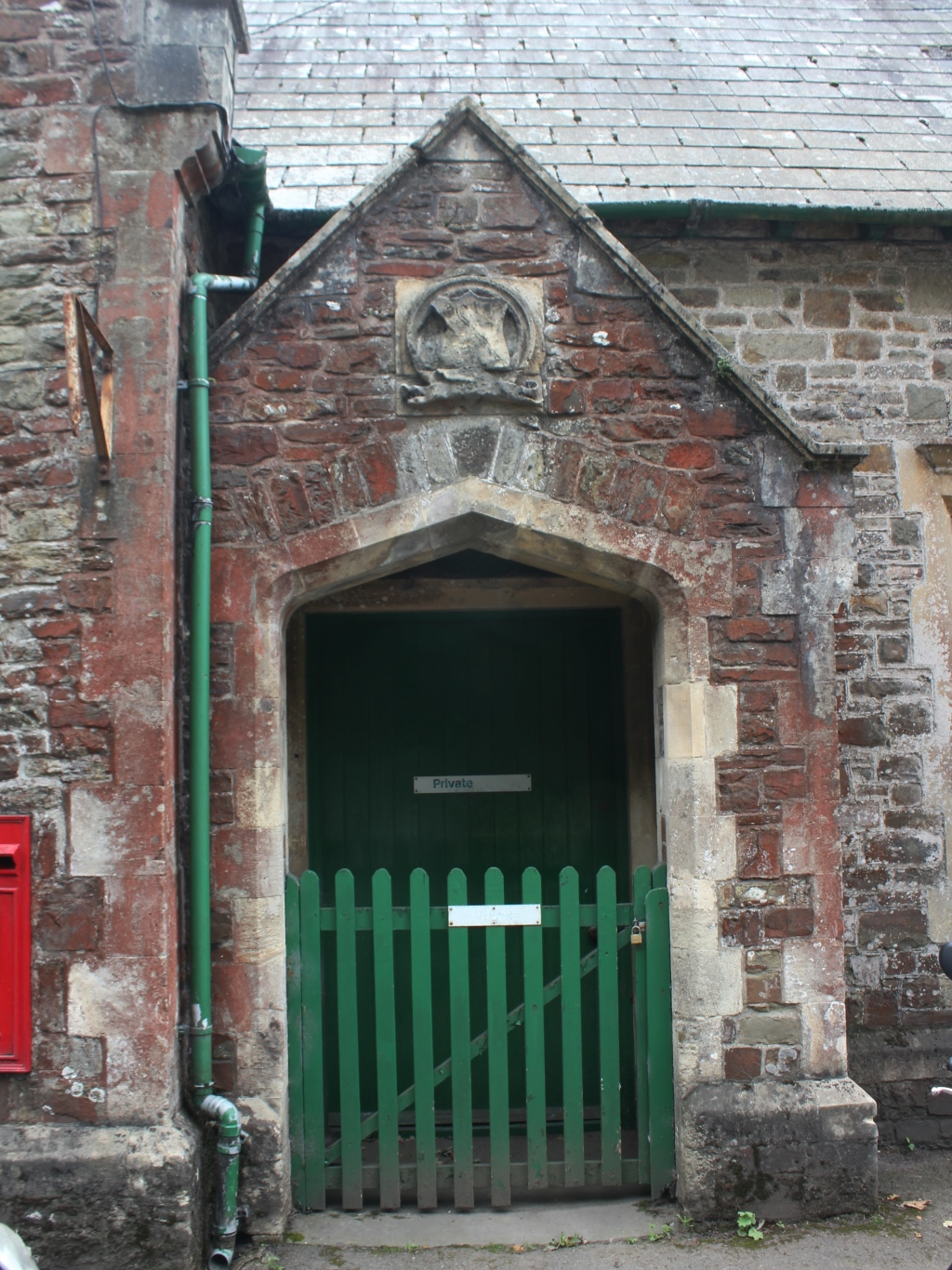
The old entrance

The original building was designed in Gothic style by William Tite and built from mudstone rubble with ashlar detailing. On the Barnstaple side of the ticket office was a waiting room and parcel store. The other side was the station master's house which had an additional room added in about 1890. The main part has two storeys but the wing with the parcels store is just one storey. A passageway through the building between the ticket office and house has a gabled porch on the road side with a heraldic carving in the gable.

The station is situated in a narrow space between the main road and the river. It is on a bend with the line going eastwards to Exeter and northwards to Barnstaple. The original building is behind the Exeter-bound platform but no longer used by passengers. There are waiting shelters on both platforms. Access to the Barnstaple platform is by a short path leading from the level crossing at the east end of the station.

== Signalling ==
The first signal box was opened on 1 October 1873. It was sited on the northbound platform but the rear was supported by two cast iron columns above a leat. When the platform subsided because of a flood in 1967 the signalman had to climb through the window. The second signal box was opened on 28 September 1969 on the same side of the line but close to the level crossing. The level crossing itself was converted to lifting barriers on 30 November 1969.

It is the only place where trains can pass between Crediton and Barnstaple. Since late 1987 the level crossing operated and tokens exchanged by the train crew. A hut at the departure end of each platform contains a No Signalman Key Token (NSKT) instrument.

== Services ==
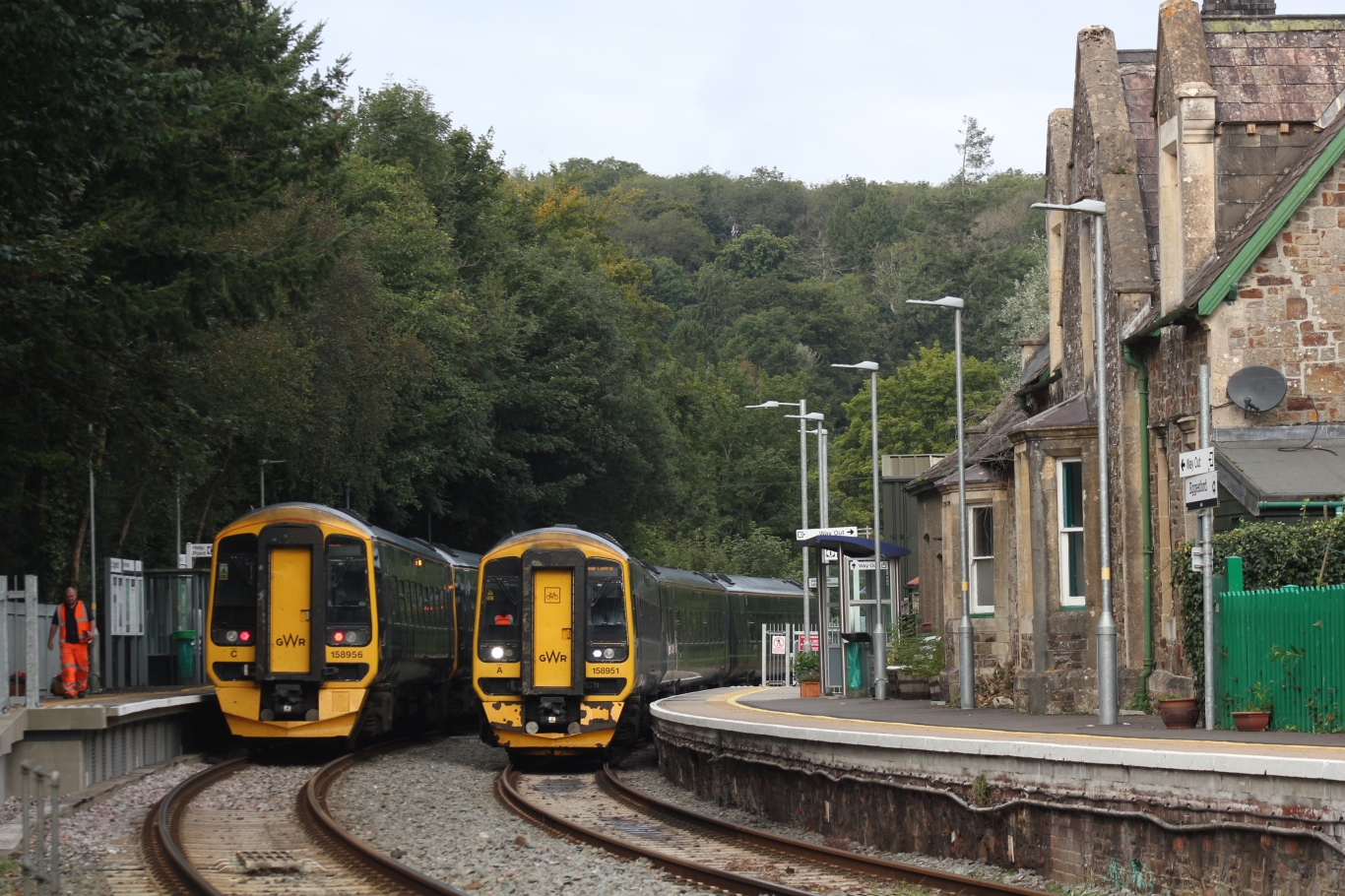
Trains passing at Eggesford

All services at Eggesford are operated by Great Western Railway. There is generally one train per hour in each direction between Barnstaple and Exeter Central but a very small number of services continue to or from other routes in East Devon on weekdays.

Preceding station	National Rail	Following station
Kings Nympton towards Barnstaple	Great Western Railway Tarka Line	Lapford towards Exeter Central

== Community railway ==
The railway between Exeter and Barnstaple is designated as a community railway and is supported by marketing provided by the Devon and Cornwall Rail Partnership. The line is promoted as the Tarka Line.
