= Penstone =

Hamlet in Devon, England

Coordinates: 50.790°N 3.739°W

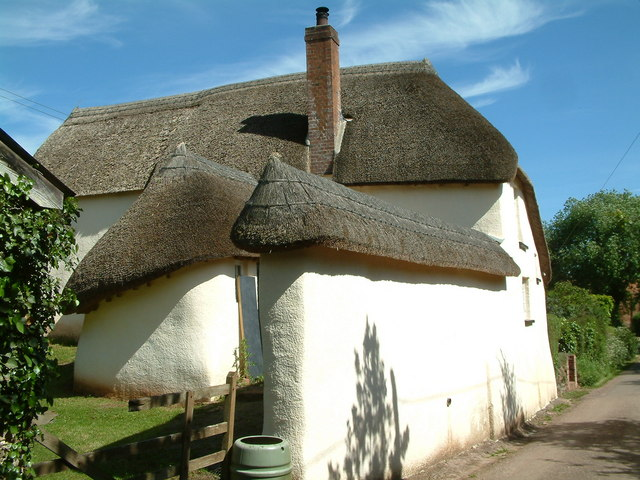
A thatched cottage in Penstone

Location of Penstone in Devon

Penstone is a hamlet of some 21 houses in Devon, England, about 1 mile (2 km) from the villages of Colebrooke and Coleford, close to the point where the Exeter-Barnstaple and former Exeter-Okehampton rail lines diverge; the latter is now a freight line but there has recently been talk of reopening it to passenger traffic and extending it to Plymouth in order to avoid the shoreline track at Dawlish Warren which has recently been washed away several times by winter storms. The nearest stations are Yeoford and Copplestone.

Penstone residents maintain the Penstone Glade, a community space for the hamlet in the angle of the tracks and adjacent to the River Yeo (one of many such in the southwest of England), and organise a variety of events there. Penstone is built on the south-facing slopes of the hills to the north of the river, with views to Colebrooke and Dartmoor in the distance.
