= Newton St Cyres railway station =

Railway station in Devon, England

Newton St Cyres
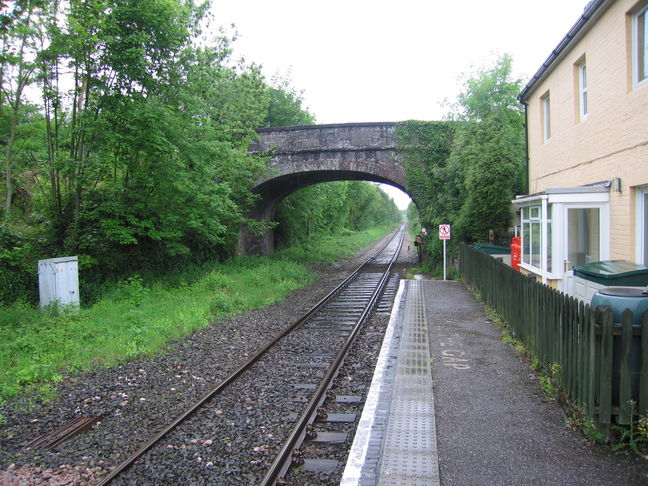
- Looking north towards Crediton

General information
- Location: Newton St Cyres, Mid Devon; England
- Coordinates: 50.77884°N 3.58915°W
- Grid reference: SX880989
- Manager: Great Western Railway
- Platforms: 1

Other information
- Station code: NTC
- Classification: DfT category F2

History
- Original company: Exeter and Crediton Railway
- Pre-grouping: London and South Western Railway
- Post-grouping: Southern Railway

Key dates
- Opened: 1851

Passengers
- 2021/22: ▲2,146
- 2022/23: ▲4,242
- 2023/24: ▲6,776
- 2024/25: ▲7,648
- 2025/26: ▼7,478
Location
Notes
- Passenger statistics from the Office of Rail and Road

Newton St Cyres railway station is a railway station serving the village of Newton St Cyres, Devon, England. It is served by Great Western Railway trains on the Tarka and Dartmoor lines. It is on the Tarka Line to Barnstaple, 4 miles 21 chains (6.9 km) from Exeter Central at milepost 175.75 from London Waterloo.

== History ==
The Exeter and Crediton Railway was opened on 12 May 1851 but this, the only intermediate station, was not opened until October 1851. At the time it was named just 'St Cyres'. Only one track was in use at the time due to a dispute a dispute over the track gauge and this served the platform on the north side of the railway. The ticket office and facilities were in a wooden building which was probably moved from Cowley where the railway had intended to open a temporary terminus in 1848 but were unable to do so.

The line towards Exeter was doubled and a signal box provided from 23 February 1875, then the line towards Crediton was doubled from 2 June 1875. The station was renamed as Newton St Cyres on 1 October 1913.

The signal box was closed on 17 August 1930 when the signalling equipment was transferred into the booking office. The goods yard closed on 12 September 1960 and the signals taken out of use on 31 July 1968. The line became just a single track again on 16 December 1984.

The platform on the south side is still in place but disused. The former station master's house is now in private use. The former Station Hotel is now named "The Beer Engine". It is the oldest micro-brewery in Devon.

== Description ==
The station is located next to a bridge that carries a minor road that leads north from the village of Newton St Cyres. The platform that is in use is on the north side of the line and has a waiting shelter. There is no ticket machine or other facilities and the station is unstaffed.

The platform height is significantly lower than many other railway stations on the UK railway network. To reduce the height difference, a Harrington Hump was installed at the station. Trains will only stop adjacent to the hump, with the train guard operating only their local door to allow passengers to board or alight.

== Services ==
All services at Newton St Cyres are operated by Great Western Railway. Only a limited number of trains (between six and eight each way each day) between Barnstaple or Okehampton and Exeter Central call at Newton St Cyres and this is only on request to the conductor or by signalling the driver as it approaches.

Preceding station	National Rail	Following station
Crediton towards Okehampton	Great Western Railway Dartmoor Line	Exeter St Davids towards Exeter Central
Crediton towards Barnstaple	Great Western Railway Tarka Line	Exeter St Davids towards Exeter Central

== Community railway ==
The railway between Exeter and Barnstaple is promoted as the Tarka Line. It is designated as a community railway and is supported by the Devon and Cornwall Rail Partnership.
