= Down St Mary =

Village in Devon, England

Coordinates: 50.825°N 3.783333°W

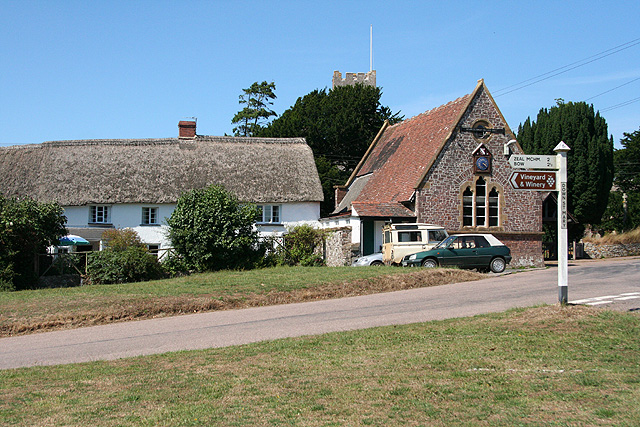
- The Green

- Location within Devon
- Population: 374
- OS grid reference: SX7404
- Civil parish: Down St Mary
- District: Mid Devon
- Shire county: Devon
- Region: South West
- Country: England
- Sovereign state: United Kingdom
- Post town: Crediton
- Postcode district: EX17
- Dialling code: 01363
- Police: Devon and Cornwall
- Fire: Devon and Somerset
- Ambulance: South Western
- UK Parliament: Central Devon

Down St Mary is a small village and civil parish in Mid Devon in the English county of Devon. It also gives its name to a Church of England parish, which encompasses both it and the civil parish of Copplestone.

== History ==
The parish church is dedicated to St Mary, and sits on a hill, for which the Old English word was "dun"; this provides the origin of the village and parish name. The lands of the current civil parish of Down St Mary, in addition to some outlying lands, were given as gift of three hides by King Edgar the Peaceful to a minister named Ælfhere in 974. Much of the borders of this gift, such those defined by the River Yeo and Knighty Brook, and the A3072, remain the borders of the parish. The Domesday Book of 1086 mentions three places within the boundaries of the modern civil parish: the village itself, then owned partially by Buckfast Abbey and partially by the King; Wolfin, an extant farmstead then owned by Walter de Claville; and Chaffcombe, an extant hamlet recorded then as having no inhabitants. Of the 39 recorded households, 11 were those of slaves.

On 21 July 1644, Robert Devereux, 3rd Earl of Essex led a Parliamentarian army along the border of the parish via the A3072, and was pursued by King Charles I on 29 July. The march was recorded by diarist and antiquary Richard Symonds, who traveled with the King and who copied the dates of the Earl's march from a record found on the body of a Parliamentarian soldier killed at the Battle of Lostwithiel.

On 1 August 1854, Morchard Road railway station and Copplestone railway station were opened by the North Devon Railway near the edges of the parish (since 1993, the latter now sits in the civil parish of Copplestone). Ernie Bevin (1881–1951), later a prominent member of the World War 2 coalition government, Foreign Minister in the Attlee Ministry and considered by Baron Adonis to be "one of the greatest and most inspirational leaders of the twentieth century", lived at both locations as a young boy. Having been orphaned, he lived in the household of his half-sister and her husband, a railway worker. He worked briefly in the fields around Chaffcombe owned by Beers Farm, harvesting turnips. It was held in Copplestone, though denied by Bevin, that he had left after threatening the farmer with a billhook. A contemporaneous farmhand, John Perkins, later reported he had remarked that "That boy will never work on a farm, but he'll be in Parliament yet".

== Governance ==
As of 2026, the most recent parish council election (2024) was unopposed and left vacancies, which were then filled by co-option (election by existing councillors). The parish sits in the Upper Yeo and Taw ward for the purposes of Mid Devon district council elections, and has been represented by two Liberal Democrat district councillors since 2024. For Devon County Council elections it sits in the Creedy Taw and Mid Exe ward, which was created for the 2017 election and since 2025 has been represented by a Liberal Democrat councillor. Nationally, the parish has lain since 2010 in the parliamentary constituency of Central Devon, represented by a Conservative MP, Mel Stride.

== Geography ==
The village is approximately 21 km (13 mi) north-west of Exeter, and approximately 266 km (165 mi) south-west of London. It sits on one of several hills in an undulating agricultural landscape. The River Yeo, Knighty Brook and Ash Brook all bound the parish, and a few small unnamed watercourses penetrate it, but none cross it. The valleys associated with the watercourses set a minimum elevation around 90 m; the hilltops vary in elevation from a little over 100 m, to 176 m. Alluvial deposits of silt, clay and gravel are present due to the watercourses. In some areas these deposits are known to be between about 11 and 125 thousand years old; in others they are only known to have been laid down at some point between 2.5 million years ago and the present. The bedrock of the southern parish border is substantially breccia from the Bow breccia formation, created in the Permian, approximately 300 to 250 million years ago; the bedrock throughout the rest of the parish is about 10–20 million years older, from the Carboniferous Bude formation, and comprises mixed strips of mudstone and siltstone, and sandstone. All of the bedrock of the parish was formed underwater. The bedrock imparts a characteristic red colour to the soil; the Bow breccia formation forms part of the Devon Redlands.

As of 2022, land use data is available at the level of lower Layer Super Output Area; Down St Mary parish forms the easternmost part of an area also including the parishes of Wembworthy, Brushford, Eggesford, Coldridge, Nymet Rowland, and Zeal Monachorum. 82% of this area is used for agriculture, 12% is forest, land and open water, and 3% is taken up by transport and utilities infrastructure. Residential use occupies less than 1%.

== Demographics ==
ONS estimated population by age, 2024
Age	Estimate
≥ 85	3
80–84	13
75–79	29
70–74	35
65–69	20
60–64	31
55–59	32
50–54	23
45–49	20
40–44	18
35–39	21
30–34	11
25–29	21
20–24	15
15–19	14
10–14	27
5–9	18
≤ 4	9

At the 2021 census, the parish had 154 households, 72% of which were single-family households. 97% of household accommodation consisted of whole houses or bungalows, and 97% of households had no second address.

The parish remained predominantly Christian: 52% of census respondents identified as Christian and 39% identified with no religion. The parish has undergone significant secularisation since the 2001 census, when 78 % identified as Christian and only 16% identified as having no religion. Other religions and refusals to answer made up the remainder in both cases.

63% of the population was economically active, rising from 51% in 2001. The most common occupations were skilled trades at 16% and the least was sales and customer service occupations at 7%.

97% of the population of the parish identified as White. 87% identified as being in either good or very good health; 84% identified as not having a disability under the Equality Act 2010. 89% were not currently supplying unpaid care.

45% of households were identified as being deprived in one or more of the following categories: education, employment, health and housing.

== Economy ==
As of 2026, in line with land use, the primary economy of the parish is agriculture, including a solar farm of approximately 7 acres. Tourism, leisure and hospitality are represented by a golf course, several holiday accommodations, a fishing lake, and a public house.

== Landmarks ==
The Church of St Mary The Virgin is a Grade I listed building, founded in the 11th century and possibly Anglo-Saxon in origin, and rebuilt in the 15th century. It contains a number of features from that time onwards, and also houses the war memorials for the parish. In the churchyard are two standing crosses, both scheduled monuments, one of which remains in its original position, the other of which was removed, but re-erected some time between 1897–1909 after being found in use as a paving slab in Bow. The old rectory, now a private dwelling, was designed in 1842 by John Hayward in the Tudor Gothic Revival style, and is Grade II* listed. In Chaffcombe, the farmhouse of Chaffcombe Manor is likewise Grade II* listed, made from cob and rubble with features from the early 17th century onwards.
