= Yeoford =

Village in Devon, England

Coordinates: 50.7735°N 3.7281°W

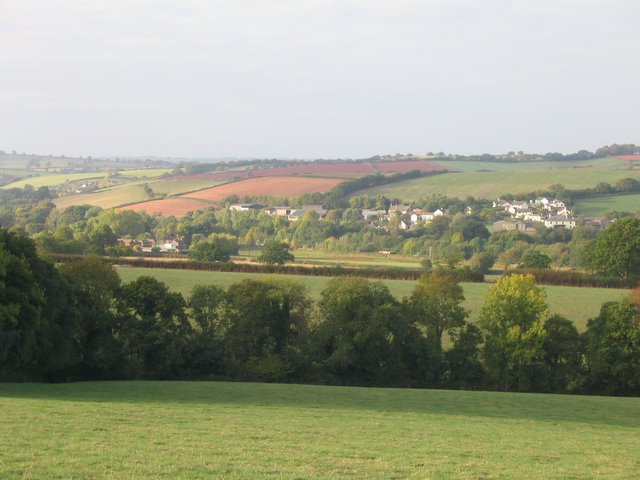
- Yeoford

- Location within Devon
- OS grid reference: SX781985
- Civil parish: Crediton Hamlets
- District: Mid Devon
- Shire county: Devon
- Region: South West
- Country: England
- Sovereign state: United Kingdom
- Post town: CREDITON
- Postcode district: EX17
- Dialling code: 01363
- Police: Devon and Cornwall
- Fire: Devon and Somerset
- Ambulance: South Western
- UK Parliament: Central Devon

Yeoford (/ˈjoʊfərd/) is a village 3 miles (5 km) west of Crediton in Devon, England. It is served by Yeoford railway station on the Tarka Line of the Devon Metro.

== History ==
The name is first recorded in 1242 as Ioweford; the name Yeo derives from Old English and means river on whose banks yew trees grow. The railway station opened on 1 August 1854, initially with a broad gauge railway, but this was changed to standard gauge in 1877.

== Primary school ==
Yeoford Community Primary School was opened in 1878. The school has three mixed-age classes at present. In January 2012 it formed The Woodleigh Federation with Tedburn St Mary and Cheriton Bishop Primary schools. The aim was to ensure the long term viability of these relatively small rural village schools along with improving inter school links for the benefit of all the pupils. It later joined the Link Academy Trust.

== Local authority ==
Yeoford is located within Mid Devon local authority area. Historically, it formed part of Crediton Hundred. It falls within Crediton/Sandford Deanery for ecclesiastical purposes.
