= Copplestone =

Village in Devon, England

Coordinates: 50.8°N 3.75°W

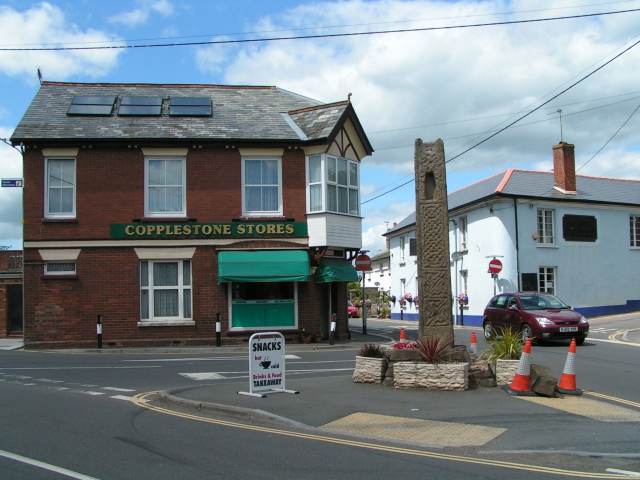
- Copplestone

- Location within Devon
- Population: 1,253 (2011)
- OS grid reference: SS7602
- Civil parish: Copplestone
- District: Mid Devon
- Shire county: Devon
- Region: South West
- Country: England
- Sovereign state: United Kingdom
- Post town: CREDITON
- Postcode district: EX17
- Dialling code: 01363
- Police: Devon and Cornwall
- Fire: Devon and Somerset
- Ambulance: South Western
- UK Parliament: Central Devon

Copplestone (anciently Copelaston, Coplestone etc.) is a village, former manor and civil parish in Mid Devon in the English county of Devon. It is not an ecclesiastical parish as it has no church of its own, which reflects its status as a relatively recent settlement which grew up around the ancient "Copleston Cross" (see below) that stands at the junction of the three ancient ecclesiastical parishes of Colebrooke, Crediton and Down St Mary.

The small parish is surrounded clockwise from the north by the parishes of Sandford, Crediton Hamlets, Colebrooke, Clannaborough, and Down St Mary. According to the 2001 census the parish had a population of 894, increasing to 1,253 in 2011. It is situated right in the middle of Devon halfway between Exeter and Barnstaple on the A377, nestled in a valley. Copplestone is a major part of the Yeo electoral ward whose total ward population was 3,488 at the above census.

The Tarka Line railway goes through the middle of the village and calls at Copplestone railway station. Copplestone is surrounded by hills and is not far from Dartmoor, visible to the east and Exmoor to the north, a little farther away. The surrounding countryside has been used for agriculture from before Roman occupation of the area.

== Copplestone Cross ==
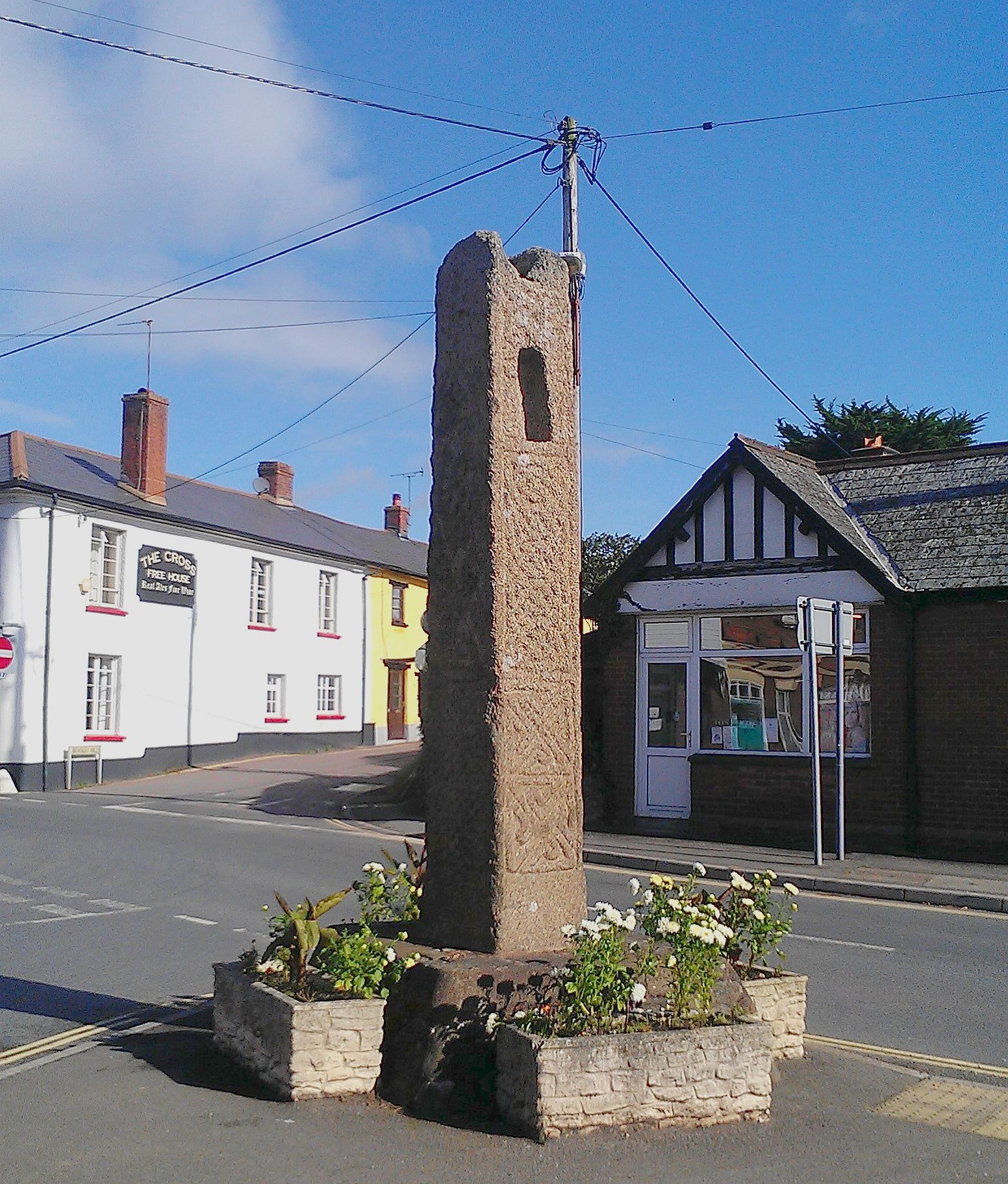
Copplestone Cross

In the centre of the village, standing at the junction of the three parishes of Colebrooke, Crediton and Down St Mary, is the Copplestone Cross, a granite pillar, said to be either a boundary stone or the surviving shaft of a decorated late Saxon cross. It stands 3.2 metres high, and is 0.6 metres square, covered with intricate relief sculpted decoration. Parallels of the intricate interlacing design have been drawn with those designs of crosses found in the Isle of Man. The granite for the cross must have been brought some 9 miles from Dartmoor, which suggests it had some deep cultural significance. It was mentioned as Copelan Stan in a charter dated 974. Putta, the second and last Bishop of Tawton (reigned 906–910), was murdered in 910 whilst travelling from his see at Bishops Tawton, on the River Taw 2 miles south of Barnstaple in North Devon, to visit the Saxon viceroy Uffa, whose residence was at Crediton. It is believed that Copplestone Cross, situated 6 miles north-west of Crediton and 22 miles south-east of Bishops Tawton, was erected in commemoration of his murder at this spot.

== Manor of Coplestone ==
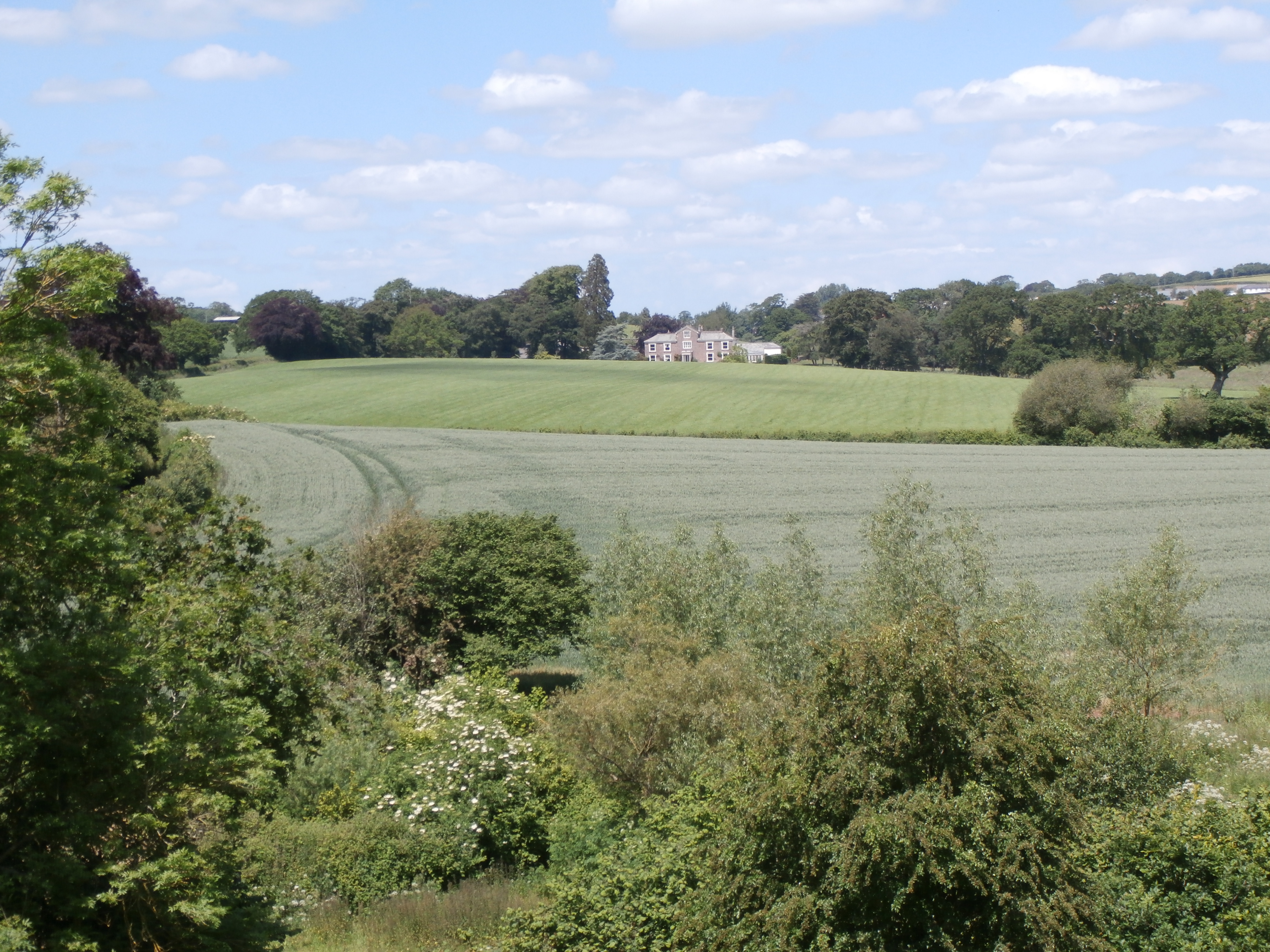
Setting of Coplestone House, viewed from south

The Copleston Cross or Stone gave its name to the estate or manor of Copleston (modern: Coplestone) which was the earliest known home of the Copleston family.

== Copplestone family ==
The Copplestone family married into both the French landowning Umfraville family and the noble Ferrers family, both noble aristocratic English families.

Notable members of the Copplestone Family include Thomas Coplestone, Edward Copleston, Frederick Copleston and more recently Michael Onslow, 7th Earl of Onslow.

More recently, the concentration of Copplestone family members has gradually moved from Devon into Hampshire and West Sussex.
