= Yeoford railway station =

Railway station in Devon, England

Yeoford
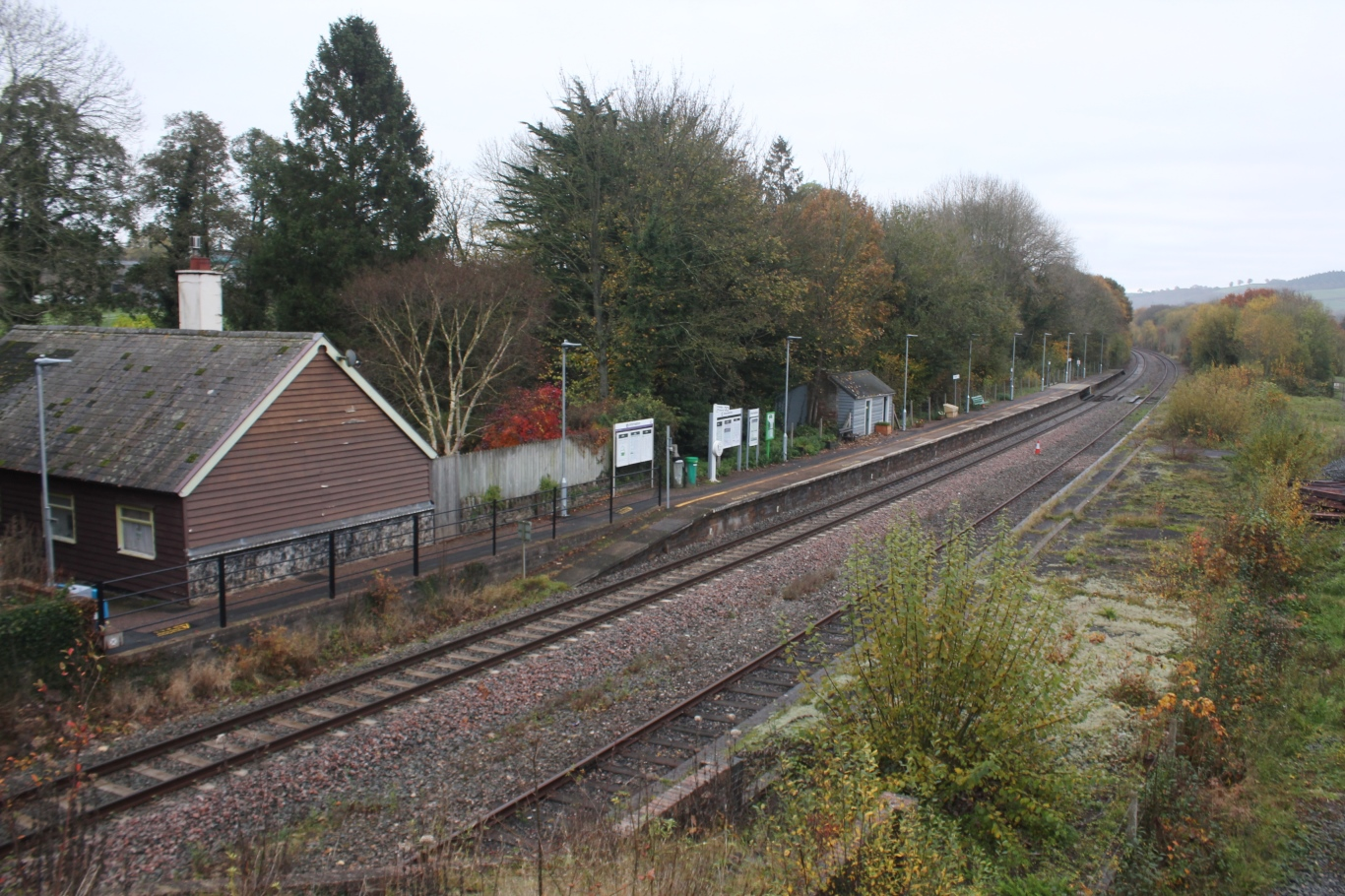

General information
- Location: Yeoford, Mid Devon; England
- Coordinates: 50.777°N 3.726°W
- Grid reference: SX783988
- Manager: Great Western Railway
- Platforms: 1

Other information
- Station code: YEO
- Classification: DfT category F2

History
- Original company: North Devon Railway
- Pre-grouping: London and South Western Railway
- Post-grouping: Southern Railway

Key dates
- Opened: 1857

Passengers
- 2021/22: ▲16,442
- 2022/23: ▲21,902
- 2023/24: ▲23,358
- 2024/25: ▼19,890
- 2025/26: ▼16,324
Location
Notes
- Passenger statistics from the Office of Rail and Road

Yeoford railway station is a rural station serving the village of Yeoford in Devon, England. It is on the Tarka Line to Barnstaple between Copplestone and Crediton, 182 miles 72 chains (294.3 km) from London Waterloo, measured via Andover. The station is on the northern edge of the Yeoford.

== History ==
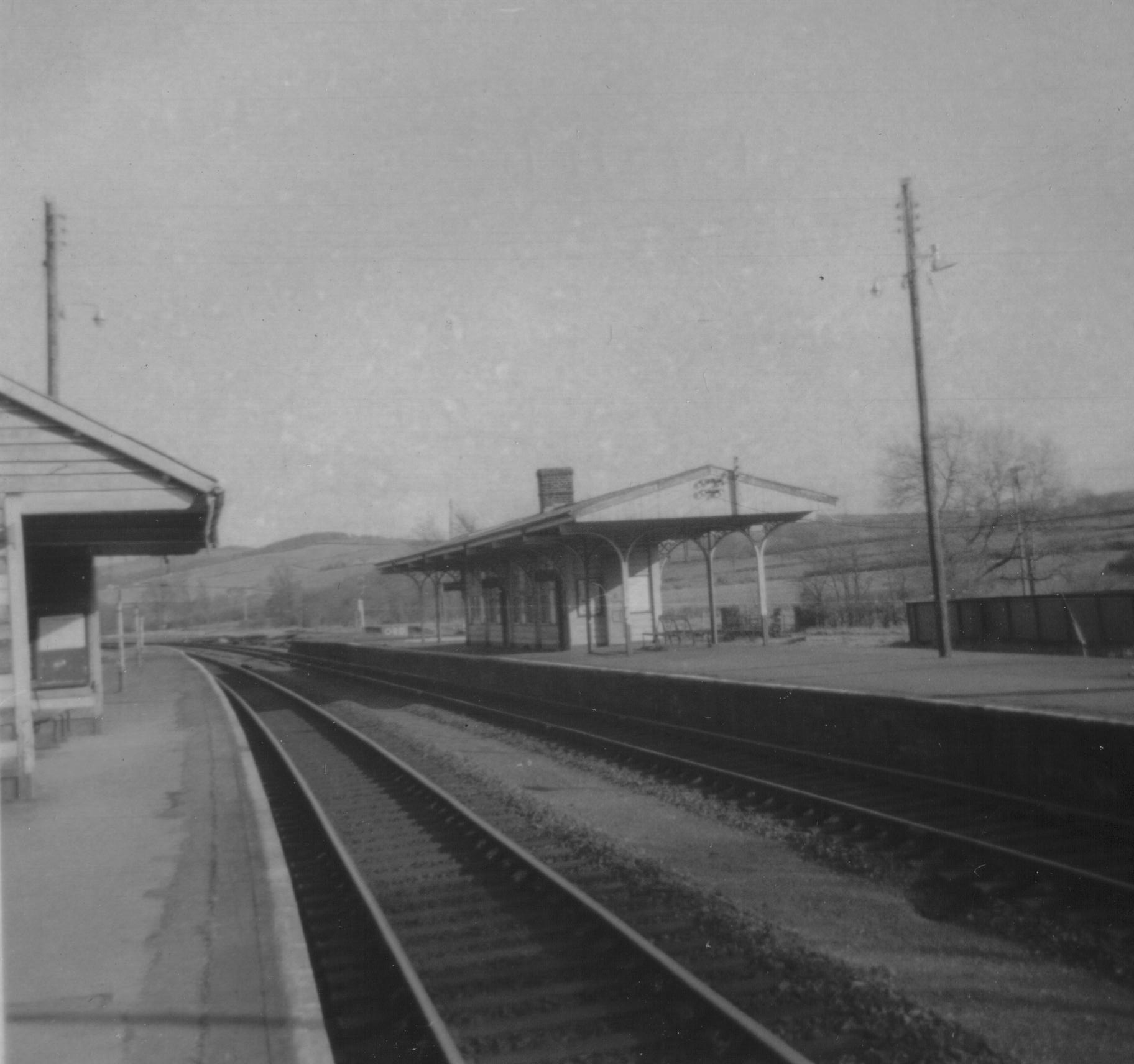
Yeoford station on 14 July 1969

The station was opened by the North Devon Railway in July 1857. On 1 November 1865 the first section of the Okehampton Railway opened from Yeoford (now known as Yeoford Junction) to North Tawton, although the new railway ran alongside the existing North Devon line almost to Coleford. This route was to become the London and South Western Railway main line to Plymouth. To carry this extra traffic the line was doubled from Crediton to Yeoford on 1 June 1876 and onwards to a new Coleford Junction on 16 May 1877. The platform for trains going towards Plymouth and Barnstaple was given an extra track so trains could stand on both sides.

There were sidings on both sides of the station but in 1943 additional long sidings were laid at the Crediton end south of the Plymouth platform so that traffic could be exchanged between the two routes. The goods yard was closed on 10 February 1964 and the signal box closed on 18 August 1968. Through trains beyond Okehampton to Plymouth had been withdrawn in May 1968 and passenger services to Okehampton ceased in 1972.

Coleford Junction was closed on 17 October 1971, since when the two lines at Yeoford have been operated as individual lines from Crediton to Barnstaple and to the quarry at Meldon near Okehampton. The Dartmoor Railway had planned to reopen the disused platform at Yeoford in order to create an interchange with the Tarka Line (and thus the national network). Through running from Yeoford to Okehampton was intended to commence in 2009 but this failed to happen. Daily passenger trains have since been restored between Exeter and Okehampton (now known as the Dartmoor line) but they cannot call at Yeoford as the platform on that line is derelict. The Tarka Line trains use what used to be the southbound platform in both directions.

As of 2014, the shelter at the station contained a small library. The former station master's house is in residential use.

== Signalling ==
The signal box at Yeoford was opened on 1 June 1876. It was situated on the west side of the road bridge alongside the line to Coleford Junction. It had a wooden upper storey on top of an unusually tall stone base which was necessary so that the signaller could see over the bridge to the station and goods yard. It was closed on 18 August 1968.

=== Coleford Junction ===
When the line towards Okehampton opened in 1865 the junction was at Yeoford with the two single tracks running beside each other for 77 chains (1.5 km) as far as Penstone. To create a double-track route in 1877 the Okehampton line became the down line and the Barnstaple line became the up. This required a proper junction at Penstone which was called Coleford Junction. A signal box was opened here on 16 May 1877. It was closed on 17 October 1971 when the physical junction was moved to Crediton.

=== Neopardy ===
Trains shunting at Yeoford blocked the busy line from Crediton so an additional signal box was provided at Neopardy to break the section into smaller parts, that allowed a train to be sent forward from Crediton while another train was blocking the line at Yeoford. It is not known when it opened but it was before 1890. It was generally only in use Mondays to Saturdays during the daytime, although in later years it was only brought into use on busy days such as summer weekends. It was closed completely on 7 April 1916.

== Facilities ==
Common with many other rural stations in the South West, there are only basic facilities, including a waiting shelter and a help point.

== Passenger volume ==
Passenger volume at Yeoford
	2004–05	2005–06	2006–07	2007–08	2008–09	2009–10	2010–11	2011–12	2012–13	2013–14	2014–15	2015–16	2016–17	2017–18	2018–19	2019–20	2020–21	2021–22	2022–23	2023–24	2024–25
Entries and exits	6,883	6,848	7,701	7,445	7,946	10,504	12,948	14,164	13,746	15,588	17,128	16,450	18,580	18,156	17,116	17,236	7,884	16,442	21,902	23,358	19,890

The statistics cover twelve month periods that start in April.

== Services ==
All services at Yeoford are operated by Great Western Railway. There is generally one train per hour in each direction between Barnstaple and Exeter Central and all call at Yeoford on request to the conductor or by signalling the driver as it approaches.

Preceding station	National Rail	Following station
Copplestone towards Barnstaple	Great Western Railway Tarka Line	Crediton towards Exeter Central
Historical railways
Bow	London and South Western Railway (Exeter to Okehampton)	Crediton

== Community railway ==
The railway between Exeter and Barnstaple is designated as a community railway and is supported by marketing provided by the Devon and Cornwall Rail Partnership. The line is promoted as the Tarka Line.
