= Lapford railway station =

Railway station in Devon, England

Lapford
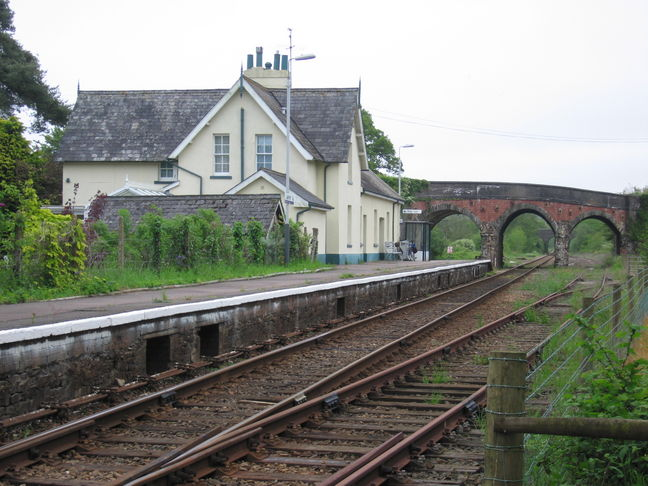
- Lapford in 2006 before the second track was removed

General information
- Location: Lapford, Mid Devon; England
- Coordinates: 50.8575°N 3.8108°W
- Grid reference: SS726079
- Manager: Great Western Railway
- Platforms: 1

Other information
- Station code: LAP
- Classification: DfT category F2

History
- Original company: North Devon Railway
- Pre-grouping: London and South Western Railway
- Post-grouping: Southern Railway

Key dates
- Opened: 1855

Passengers
- 2021/22: ▲4,532
- 2022/23: ▲6,226
- 2023/24: ▲7,660
- 2024/25: ▲8,488
- 2025/26: ▼7,814
Location
Notes
- Passenger statistics from the Office of Rail and Road

Lapford railway station is a rural station on the Tarka Line, serving the village of Lapford in Devon. It is 18 miles 35 chains (29.7 km) from Exeter Central at milepost 189.75 from London Waterloo.

== History ==
Lapford in 1913.

The railway between Crediton and Barnstaple was opened by the North Devon Railway on 1 August 1854 but there was no station at Lapford until 20 September 1855 when a platform was opened on the north side of the single track to the west of the road bridge. This was provided with a stone building containing the offices and a house for the station master,

A passing loop was opened on 1 October 1873 and a wooden signal box with 13 levers built opposite the west end of the platform by the points to the loop. There was no room here for a platform to serve the new second track so it had to be built on the east side of the road bridge. This platform was unusually built in between the two lines but the back of the platform was fenced off so passengers could only board or leave westbound trains (those towards Barnstaple). The new platform was provided with a waiting shelter which incorporated a small booking office where tickets were sold for about eight minutes before trains were due to call.

A slaughterhouse for sheep and pigs used to be situated in the northern arch of the road bridge (some meat hooks can be seen in the wall}. In 1927 a factory was built next to the goods yard for Ambrosia and production of milk products such as tinned cream started in April 1928. In 1928 Lapford had received 9,700 imperial gallons (44,000 L) but by 1932 this had increased to 191,304 imperial gallons (869,690 L). The factory closed in 1970.

The signal box closed on 21 June 1970. Public goods traffic had ceased from 4 December 1967 however the yard remained open to receive fertiliser traffic until 1991. The loop line remained available for use until December 2010.

== Description ==
The station is situated south west of Lapford, with the single platform the west of the A377 road bridge. The former station house is now in private use but a small waiting shelter is situated in the platform.

== Services ==
All services at Lapford are operated by Great Western Railway. Only a limited number of trains (four each way on Saturdays and Sundays but more during the week) between Barnstaple and Exeter Central call at Lapford and this is only on request to the conductor or by signalling the driver as it approaches.

Preceding station	National Rail	Following station
Eggesford towards Barnstaple	Great Western Railway Tarka Line	Morchard Road towards Exeter Central

== Community railway ==
The railway between Exeter and Barnstaple is designated as a community railway and is supported by marketing provided by the Devon and Cornwall Rail Partnership. The line is promoted as the Tarka Line.
