= Cowley, Devon =

Hamlet in Devon, England

Coordinates: 50°45′03″N 3°33′09″W

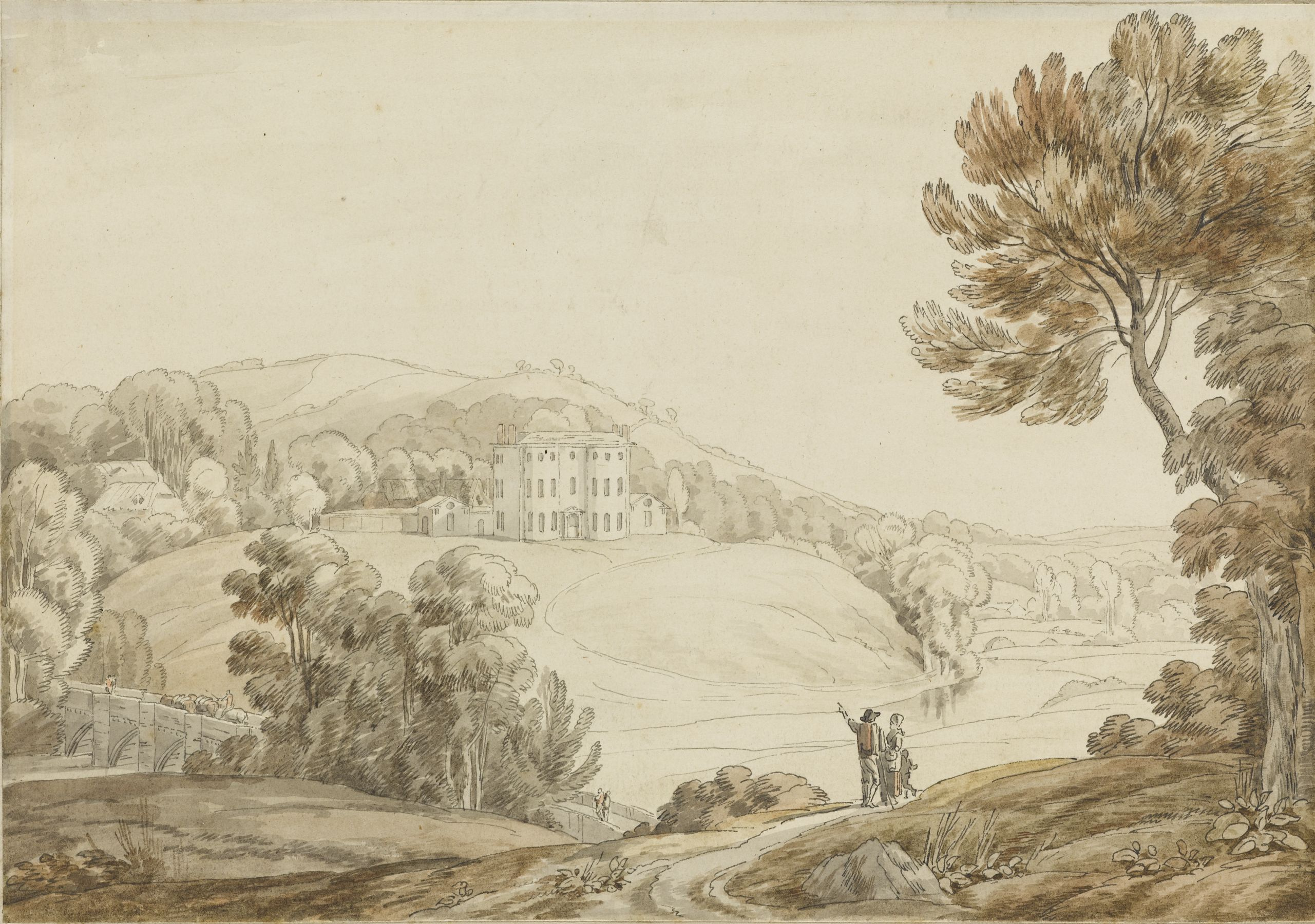
Pen and ink drawing by Francis Towne of Cowley Place and Cowley bridge from The Royal Albert Memorial Museum's collection (31/1935)

Cowley is a hamlet in the parish of Upton Pyne in Devon, England.

Cowley church was built as a chapel of ease to Brampford Speke by Rohde Hawkins in 1867–8.

It is chiefly notable for a fine three-arched bridge of classical design, built over the River Creedy in 1813-14 by James Green, pupil of John Rennie and surveyor to the county of Devon. Although so recent in date, the bridge has been scheduled as an ancient monument.

== Cowley Bridge Junction ==
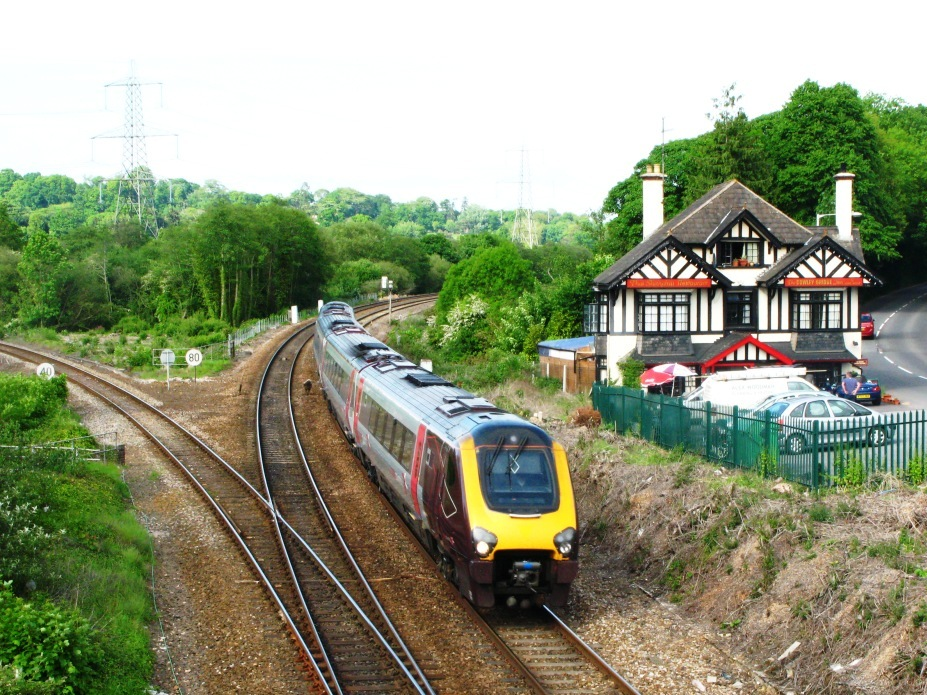
CrossCountry Class 220 Voyager passes Cowley Bridge Junction with a train towards Plymouth. To the left is the Tarka Line towards Barnstaple; to the right is the Cowley Bridge Inn

Cowley Bridge Junction is a railway junction on the former Bristol and Exeter Railway, that allows access to the former North Devon Railway towards Barnstaple, now renamed the Tarka Line. In 1848, the Exeter and Crediton Railway had built a station at Cowley Bridge, but it never opened.
