= Morchard Road railway station =

Railway station in Devon, England

Morchard Road
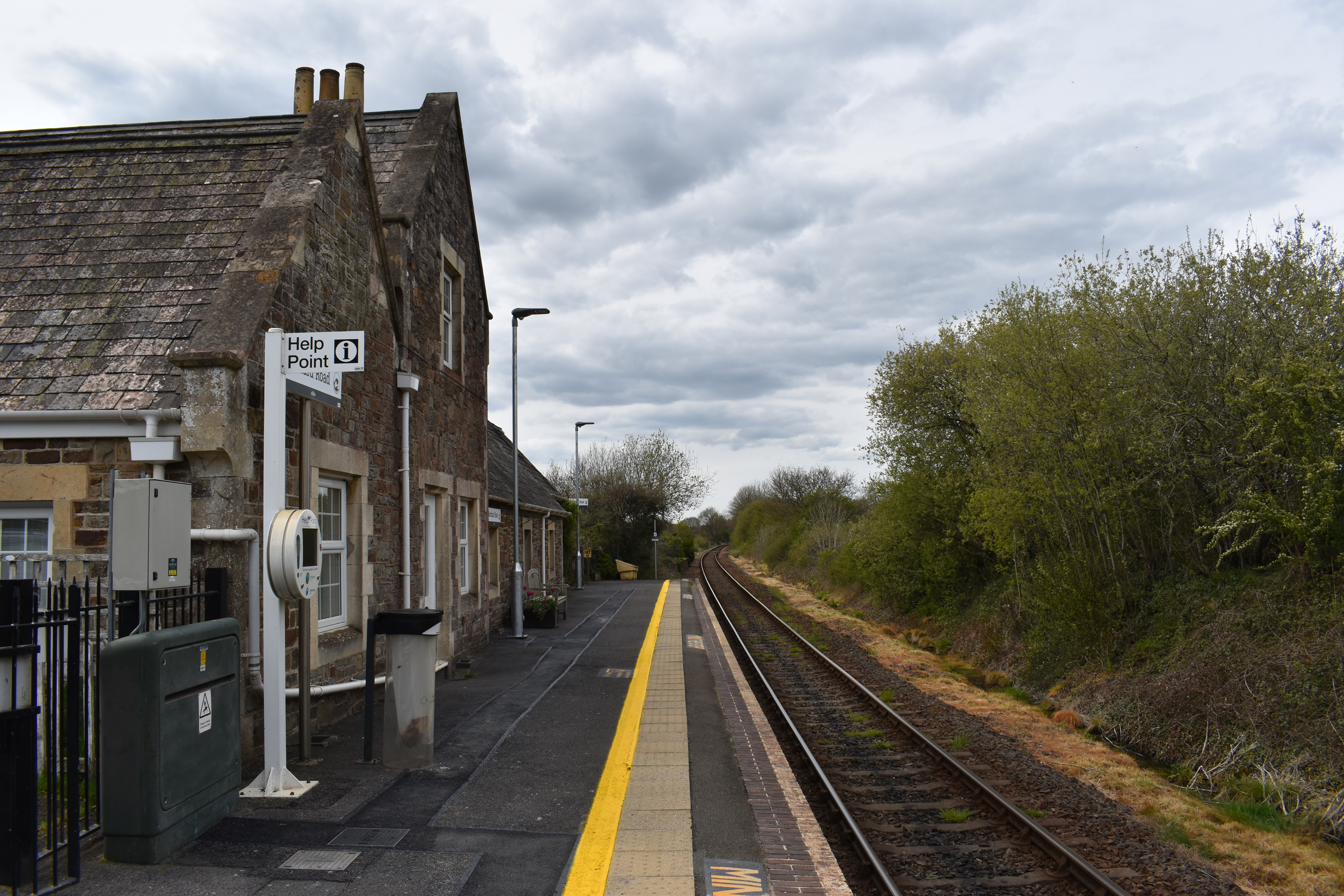

General information
- Location: Down St Mary, Mid Devon; England
- Coordinates: 50.832°N 3.776°W
- Grid reference: SS750051
- Manager: Great Western Railway
- Platforms: 1

Other information
- Station code: MRD
- Classification: DfT category F1

History
- Original company: North Devon Railway
- Pre-grouping: London and South Western Railway
- Post-grouping: Southern Railway

Key dates
- Opened: 1854

Passengers
- 2021/22: ▲16,274
- 2022/23: ▲17,114
- 2023/24: ▲20,016
- 2024/25: ▲21,854
- 2025/26: ▲23,472
Location
Notes
- Passenger statistics from the Office of Rail and Road

Morchard Road railway station is located in the village of Down St Mary in Devon, England. It is named after the village of Morchard Bishop which lies a few miles to the north-east. It is on the Tarka Line to Barnstaple, 16 miles 08 chains (25.9 km) from Exeter Central at milepost 187.5 from London Waterloo. The station and trains are operated by Great Western Railway.

== History ==
The station was opened with the North Devon Railway on 1 August 1854. It had a passing loop but no signal box until 1 October 1873. The main building, including a house for the station master, was on the platform used by trains going north towards Barnstaple while the 12-lever wooden signal box and a stone waiting shelter were provided on the other platform. There were two sidings on the north end of the Barnstaple platform. Another siding at the south end of the platform was used when two long trains needed to pass.

The goods yard was closed on 30 December 1963 and the passing loop removed when the signal box was closed on 6 March 1964. The station has been unstaffed since 12 September 1965.

== Description ==
The former northbound platform is now used by trains in both directions; the old southbound platform has been demolished. There is a waiting shelter for passengers but the stationmaster's house is now in private use.

== Services ==
All services at Morchard Road are operated by Great Western Railway. There is generally one train per hour in each direction between Barnstaple and Exeter Central and all call at Morchard Road on request to the conductor or by signalling the driver as it approaches.

Preceding station	National Rail	Following station
Lapford towards Barnstaple	Great Western Railway Tarka Line	Copplestone towards Exeter Central

== Community railway ==
The railway between Exeter and Barnstaple is designated as a community railway and is supported by marketing provided by the Devon and Cornwall Rail Partnership. The line is promoted as the Tarka Line.
