= Exeter and Crediton Railway =

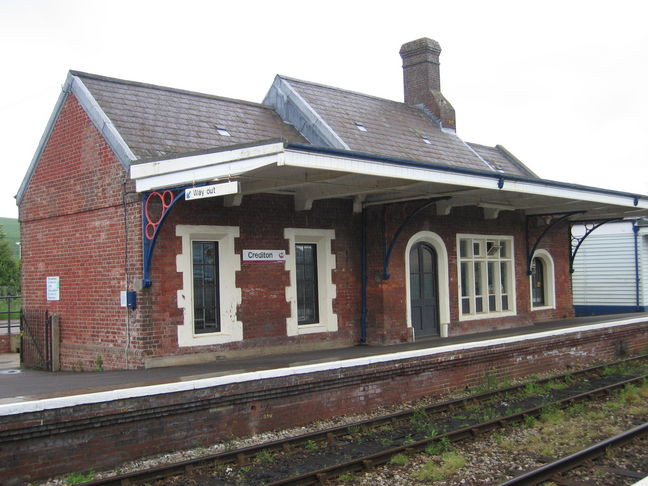
- Crediton railway station

Overview
- Dates of operation: 1851–1923
- Successor: Southern Railway

Technical
- Track gauge: 4 ft 8 1/2 in (1,435 mm) standard gauge
- Previous gauge: 7 ft (2,134 mm) until 1892

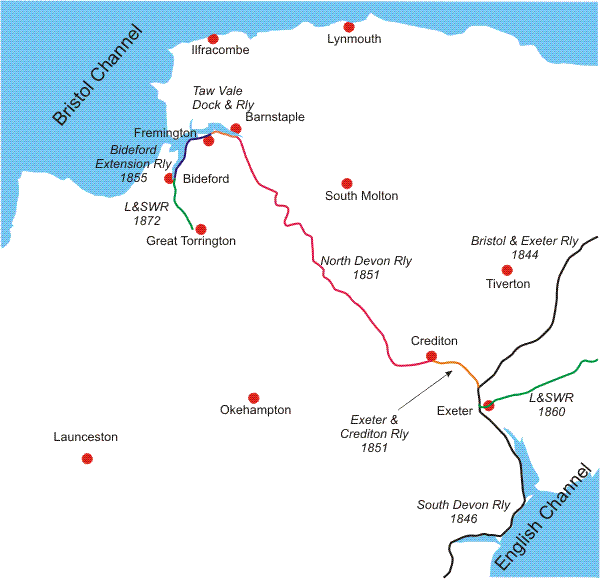
The Exeter and Crediton Railway in context

The Exeter and Crediton Railway was a 7 ft (2,134 mm) broad gauge railway that linked Exeter and Crediton, Devon, England. It was 5¼ miles (8½ km) long.

Although built in 1847, it was not opened until 12 May 1851 due to disagreement about the gauge to be used. It was initially operated by the Bristol and Exeter Railway, but eventually became a part of the London and South Western Railway, thus being one of the few broad gauge railways never to become part of the Great Western Railway.

It remains open as part of the scenic Tarka Line from Exeter to Barnstaple.

== History ==
=== Early proposals ===
Exeter and Crediton Railway Act 1832
- Act of Parliament
- Parliament of the United Kingdom
- Long title: An Act for making and maintaining a Railway from the Basin of the Exeter Canal in the Parish of Saint Thomas the Apostle in the County of Devon to the Four Mills in the Parish of Crediton in the said County.
- Citation: 2 & 3 Will. 4. c. xciii

Dates
- Royal assent: 23 June 1832

Text of statute as originally enacted

Crediton was an important town at the beginning of the nineteenth century, and business interests there considered how transport links could be improved. In 1831 it was proposed to make a railway connection to a dock on the tidal River Exe at Exeter was needed; onward transport would be by coastal shipping. Legal powers were obtained by the Exeter and Crediton Railway Act 1832 (2 & 3 Will. 4. c. xciii) of 23 June 1832. However no construction actually took place and the powers lapsed.

The Great Western Railway (GWR) was opened between London and Bristol in 1841, revolutionising transport in the area it served. This encouraged the promotion of another line, the Bristol and Exeter Railway (B&ER), which was completed on 1 May 1844. This in turn led to the construction of the South Devon Railway (SDR) on from Exeter to Plymouth and Torquay, opened in stages between 30 May 1846 and 2 April 1849. These railways were in a friendly alliance, and were all built on the broad gauge of 7 ft 1/4 in (2,140 mm).

Business interests in Crediton were not slow to realise that the railway at Exeter was a benefit for their town if a railway branch could be made to it, and in 1844 a proposal was formulated to make a line from Crediton to Cowley Bridge on the B&ER; the required capital of £60,000 was soon subscribed and a bill was put forward in the 1845 session of Parliament.

The Railway Mania was at its height at this time: proposals for new railways were produced daily, and many of them had little chance of financial success. Parliament established a committee of members of the Board of Trade, headed by Lord Dalhousie, to evaluate competing schemes for any particular district; it was assumed that only one line would satisfy all local requirements. The issue was complicated by the gauge question: the GWR and its allies operated on the broad gauge, while many other companies used the narrow gauge of 4 ft 8 1/2 in (1,435 mm) (later referred to as standard gauge). If a small independent line were authorised, its track gauge implied its allegiance to the GWR and its allies, or to the GWR's competitors, as the case may be.

=== The line authorised ===
Exeter and Crediton Railway Act 1845
- Act of Parliament
- Parliament of the United Kingdom
- Long title: An Act for making a Railway from Exeter to Crediton in the County of Devon.
- Citation: 8 & 9 Vict. c. lxxxviii

Dates
- Royal assent: 21 July 1845

Dalhousie's committee, widely referred to as the Five Kings, considered alternative proposals to link Barnstaple with the emerging national network, via Crediton or otherwise. However, because it became evident that the gauge question was to be determined by a new Gauge Commission, which was expected to mandate the gauge of all future railways, Dalhousie deferred a decision. In the circumstances it is surprising that the Exeter and Crediton Railway (E&CR) obtained its authorising act of Parliament, the Exeter and Crediton Railway Act 1845 (8 & 9 Vict. c. lxxxviii) on 21 July 1845, with capital of £70,000. The track gauge was to be "such as the Board of Trade shall in its discretion approve".

The new company made provisional arrangements to lease their line to the B&ER.

=== The Taw Vale line ===
Meanwhile, competing proposals were submitted to the 1846 session of Parliament for railways to connect Barnstaple to the network. The B&ER wished to make a line from their (proposed) Tiverton station, but that was rejected in favour of the Taw Vale Railway Extension and Dock Company, from Barnstaple to join the Exeter and Crediton line at Crediton. This scheme was supported by the London and South Western Railway (LSWR), which aspired to expand into Devon. At this time its nearest approach was east of Salisbury, (Note: It had purchased the little Bodmin and Wadebridge Railway in 1845 but had no physical connection to it.) but it was determined to get a main line to Exeter and into north Devon. The new company was usually referred to as the Taw Vale Extension Railway (TVER), or simply the Taw Vale Railway.

The TVER had to be built on the broad gauge, to enable through running on to the Exeter and Crediton line, and the B&ER lost no time in making a provisional lease of the TVER line to the B&ER, matching the lease of the Exeter and Crediton line.

=== Leasing the company ===
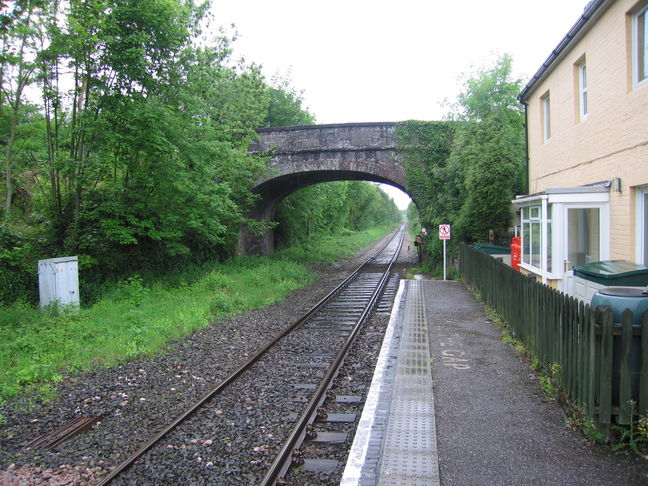
Newton St Cyres railway station

These provisional leases had to be ratified by shareholders, and at a stormy shareholders' meeting on 11 January 1847 the provisional lease was rejected; the issue of allegiance to the B&ER and the broad gauge had been taken for granted by the directors, but the shareholders thought otherwise. Many shareholders had only obtained shares in the previous week, and the vote appeared to have been engineered by the LSWR interest.

Nonetheless, the company did not propose to work the line itself, and accordingly a lease to the TVER was proposed. The TVER too had had a difficult shareholders' meeting, and had opted to join the LSWR camp. The lease of the E&CR to the TVER was ratified by E&CR shareholders on 24 February 1847; the TVER obligations were underwritten by the LSWR and in effect the E&CR was to be leased to the LSWR.

The majority of the directors of the E&CR, and the chairman J. W. Buller, were strongly in favour of the B&ER and were dismayed by this sudden rejection of their intentions. Buller quickly signed a contract to work the line with a George Hennett on 7 April 1847, with the intention of frustrating the alignment to the LSWR bloc. The minority Taw Vale directors called an extraordinary general meeting on 12 April 1847, and proposed removal of Buller and three other B&ER directors, and proposed prohibiting the opening of the line on the broad gauge. Buller as chairman declared the proposition to be illegal but it was carried. Amid angry scenes and a scuffle, Buller and his friends departed the meeting, taking the minute book with them. At subsequent legal hearings, the takeover by the Taw Vale directors was declared to be legal, and a director called Thorne was properly the chairman of the company. Complaints were made to the Railway Commissioners, and they found that the LSWR had improperly funded share purchases by local individuals to gain a majority at the votes, but the B&ER had done a similar thing over the E&CR vote.

=== Construction, but not opening ===
Notwithstanding the difficulties in shareholders' meetings, construction had been continuing and was ready (as a double track broad gauge line) early in 1847, except for the actual connection to the B&ER at Cowley Bridge, and the directors anticipated starting train services. However the LSWR supporters among the shareholding obtained an injunction from the Court of Chancery forbidding them from opening on the broad gauge. This was founded on the resolution of 12 April 1847. This was significant as that, once opened to passengers, a line could not change its gauge without a fresh act of Parliament.

The TVER, which was effectively the LSWR in control of the E&CR infrastructure, applied to the Gauge Commissioners for a decision on the gauge of their own line and made it clear that they expected that to be for the narrow gauge. Moreover, they altered the track of the E&CR line to narrow gauge, and informed the Gauge Commissioners that they proposed to start narrow gauge passenger services on the E&CR on 15 February 1848 from Crediton to Cowley Bridge, (Note: MacDermot refers to this as "in the Cowley Meadows", probably a generic location rather than a proposed station name.) just short of the B&ER. The LSWR still aspired to have an independent line from there to their own Queen Street station at Exeter.

However, on 8 February 1848 the commissioners issued their determination: the TVER (and by implication the E&CR) was to be a broad gauge line.

By now the TVER had run out of money and its sponsor, the LSWR had heavy financial commitments elsewhere that took precedence. So there was now an impasse, and the completed line and the rudimentary station at Cowley Bridge remained unused. It was not until February 1851 that a shareholders' meeting could be informed by William Chaplin, chairman of both the E&CR and the LSWR, that a lease to the B&ER had been agreed and that they would work the line, altering one of the two narrow gauge tracks to broad gauge and installing the junction with their own line at Cowley Bridge. These works would be at the expense of the E&CR. The Cowley Bridge station would not be required. Its wooden building was dismantled and re-erected at Newton St Cyres.

=== Opening at last ===
Captain Mynne of the Board of Trade inspected the line and approved it, and a ceremonial opening took place on 12 May 1851, full public services starting the same day. The E&CR was now a single broad gauge line (with an unused narrow gauge line alongside), and effectively a branch of the B&ER. The only stations were Newton St Cyres and Crediton. Road passenger coach services were instituted connecting Barnstaple and Torrington with Crediton.

The initial services consisted of seven trains per day in each direction, with a journey time of around 15 minutes. The fares were 1st class single 1s. (equivalent to £6.04 in 2025), return 1s 4d. (equivalent to £8.04 in 2025), 2nd class single 9d. (equivalent to £4.53 in 2025), return 1s, 3rd class single 4d. (equivalent to £2.01 in 2025).

=== The North Devon Railway connects ===
The TVER had suffered a reverse over the question of its gauge, and the abandonment by the E&CR of the narrow gauge exacerbated its feelings. It took some time to decide on a way forward, but by the North Devon Railway and Dock Act 1851 (14 & 15 Vict. c. lxxxiii) of 24 July 1851 it renamed itself the North Devon Railway Company (NDR), reduced its capital and its plans, and settled for a single broad gauge line connecting Barnstaple with Crediton. The act authorised NDR trains to run over the E&CR and B&ER to reach Exeter, by agreement.

The NDR opened its line to traffic on 1 August 1854 (although a premature ceremonial "opening" took place on 12 July). The NDR contracted out its operation to Thomas Brassey, and although through trains operated from Exeter to Barnstaple, engines were changed at Crediton.

=== The LSWR reaches Exeter ===
After considerable difficulties, the LSWR reached Exeter on 18 July 1860; (Note: Ceremonial opening; public opening the following day.) their Exeter station, Queen Street, was much more central than the B&ER station. There was no connection at this stage with the B&ER.

The LSWR had long harboured intentions to extend into north and west Devon, and formerly had thought of an independent line connecting to the E&CR. However the topography was challenging, and a cooling of the hostility with the B&ER led to an agreement—concluded on 14 March 1860—to connect the two networks. The London and South Western Railway (Exeter and North Devon) Act 1860 (23 & 24 Vict. c. ciii) of 3 July 1860 authorised the construction of a steeply graded connecting line from Queen Street to St Davids at Exeter, mixing the gauge on the B&ER to Cowley Bridge, and providing mixed gauge track on the E&CR, and also the NDR line.

=== LSWR acquires the E&CR ===
The necessary track was installed and LSWR trains ran to Crediton from 1 February 1862, when a lease of the E&CR line to the LSWR became effective. The lease was renewed for seven years from 1869, and the line was doubled on mixed gauge from 1 June 1875.

The LSWR dominated the E&CR board and shareholding, so independence was illusory, and the line was operated as a part of the LSWR (although a daily broad gauge goods train continued to run). The Bristol and Exeter Railway amalgamated with the Great Western Railway and other companies from 1 February 1876, the combined company using the title Great Western Railway (GWR). Negotiations took place for the LSWR to buy out the GWR shareholding in the E&CR. Not without difficulty, this was agreed and the purchase was valued at £217,687; as a majority shareholder itself, the LSWR paid out only £81,256. The transfer was effective on 26 June 1879.

=== Part of the LSWR ===
The Exeter and Crediton line was now part of the LSWR; it had long been controlled by it, and the neighbouring North Devon Railway had been acquired in 1865, so that the change of ownership simply continued the situation: the Exeter to Barnstaple line was just a branch of the LSWR.

The London and South Western Railway (Exeter and North Devon) Act 1860 obliged the LSWR to maintain broad gauge to Crediton so the B&ER (GWR from 1876 continued to run broad gauge goods trains until the abolition of broad gauge west of Exeter on 20 May 1892. Narrow gauge GWR goods trains continued operating until 1 October 1903.

The Exeter and Crediton section was the stem of the LSWR's continuing expansion in Devon; if the initial traffic in the area was in agricultural and fisheries, the LSWR energetically developed the emerging idea of seaside holidays. Nonetheless, the main line to Plymouth was the most important asset.

The main line to Plymouth was opened progressively from 1862 to 1876, relying at first on running powers over the South Devon Railway; an independent route by-passing the competing South Devon Railway was opened from Lydford to Devonport 1890.

The rocky coast of North Devon was reached in 1874 when the Ilfracombe branch from Barnstaple was opened.

Holsworthy was reached in 1879, after which Cornwall was brought into the LSWR network with the opening of the North Cornwall Railway progressively in the period 1886 to 1892, and the line was extended from Holsworthy to Bude in 1898, completing the Okehampton to Bude Line.

== After the LSWR ==
Under the Railways Act 1921 the main line railways of Great Britain were "grouped" and the LSWR formed part of the new Southern Railway (SR). The SR had a vigorous publicity organisation and developed the Devon and Cornwall holiday traffic, and the famous Atlantic Coast Express passenger train reached the towns served. From 1948 British Railways was established as the nationalised railway entity in Great Britain. With the rise of independent travel by private car, and the widespread transfer of goods transport to road, followed by the rise of cheap holidays overseas, usage of the lines collapsed and closures of many of the North Devon and North Cornwall lines followed.

The Exeter and Crediton line remains open as the stem of what is now the Barnstaple branch line; the passenger service operates under the brand name the Tarka Line.

== Stations ==
- Exeter St Davids; Bristol and Exeter Railway station, a little over a mile south of the E&CR junction; used by E&CR trains;
- Cowley Bridge; constructed in 1848 but never opened;
- St Cyres; renamed Newton St Cyres 1 October 1913;
- Crediton.

== Infrastructure ==
The line climbed gently, typically at 1 in 303, from Cowley Bridge Junction to Crediton.

The line was completed, but not opened, from Cowley Bridge Junction (with the Bristol and Exeter Railway) to Crediton in 1847. It was a broad gauge double track, and a station at Cowley Bridge was built and complete in 1848; it too was not opened. There was a double track wooden viaduct on the curve away from the B&ER line, crossing the River Exe.

The Exeter and Crediton line was opened as a single broad gauge line on 12 May 1851. The TVER line from Crediton on to Barnstaple opened as single line on the broad gauge on 1 August 1854.

The Exe viaduct at Cowley Bridge was replaced by a double track iron bridge in 1858, but as part of the work the curve to the junction was tightened considerably.

Mixed gauge track was commissioned on the E&CR line on 1 February 1862.

A short section of double track at Cowley Bridge, called Cowley loop, was opened 11 November 1874, and the line from the loop to St Cyres was doubled on 23 February 1875, and St Cyres to Crediton was doubled from 2 June 1875.

Broad gauge was abolished 20 May 1892.

The line over Cowley Viaduct was singled on 28 November 1965, and the entire line was singled 16 December 1984.

== See also ==
- Southern Railway routes west of Salisbury
