= Bow railway station (Devon) =

Former railway station in Devon, England

Coordinates: 50.78561°N 3.82205°W

Bow
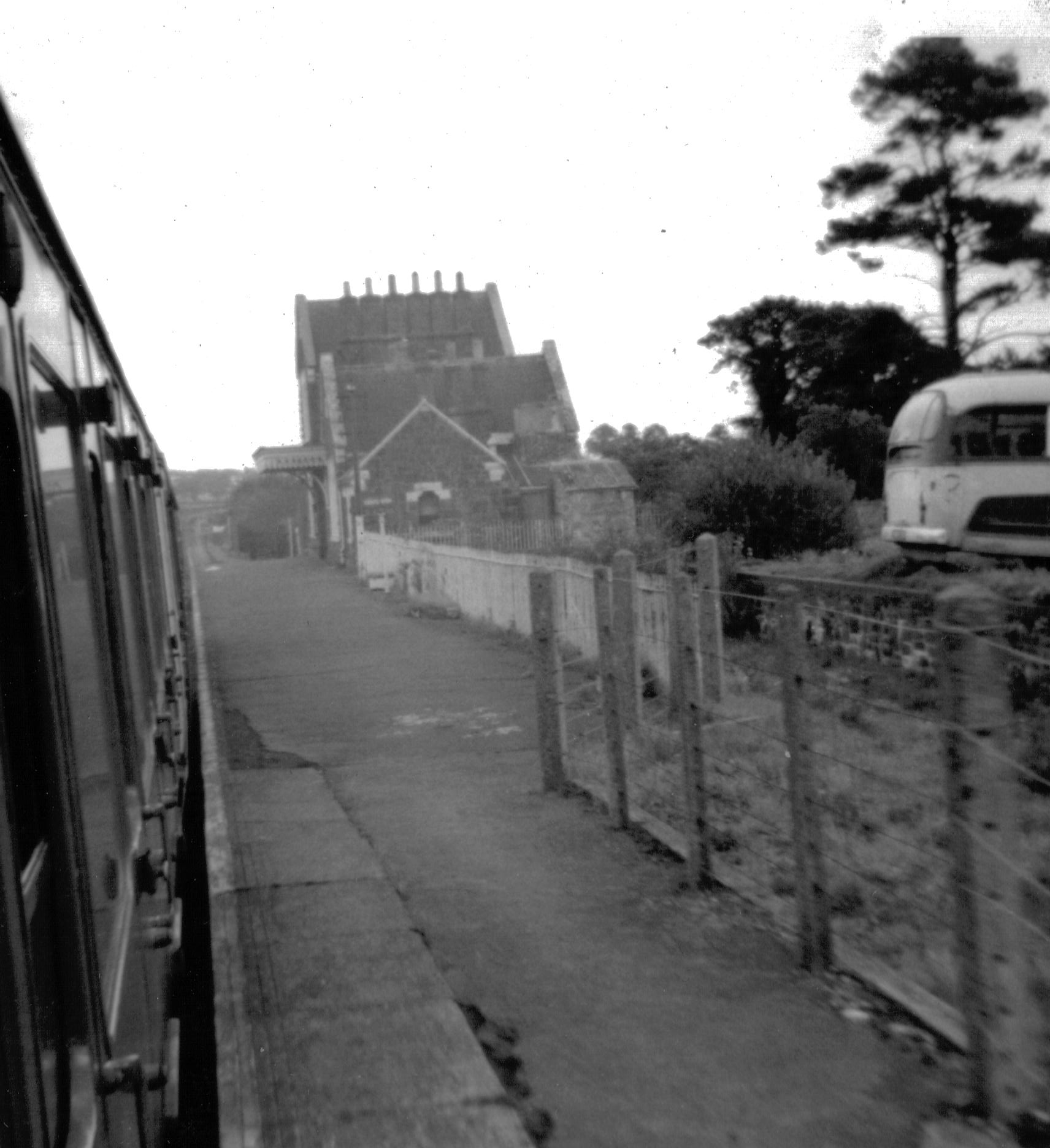
- Bow railway station in 1970

General information
- Location: Bow, Mid Devon; England
- Platforms: 2

Other information
- Status: Disused

History
- Original company: London and South Western Railway
- Pre-grouping: Southern Railway

Key dates
- 1865: Opened
- 5 June 1972: Closed to passengers
Location

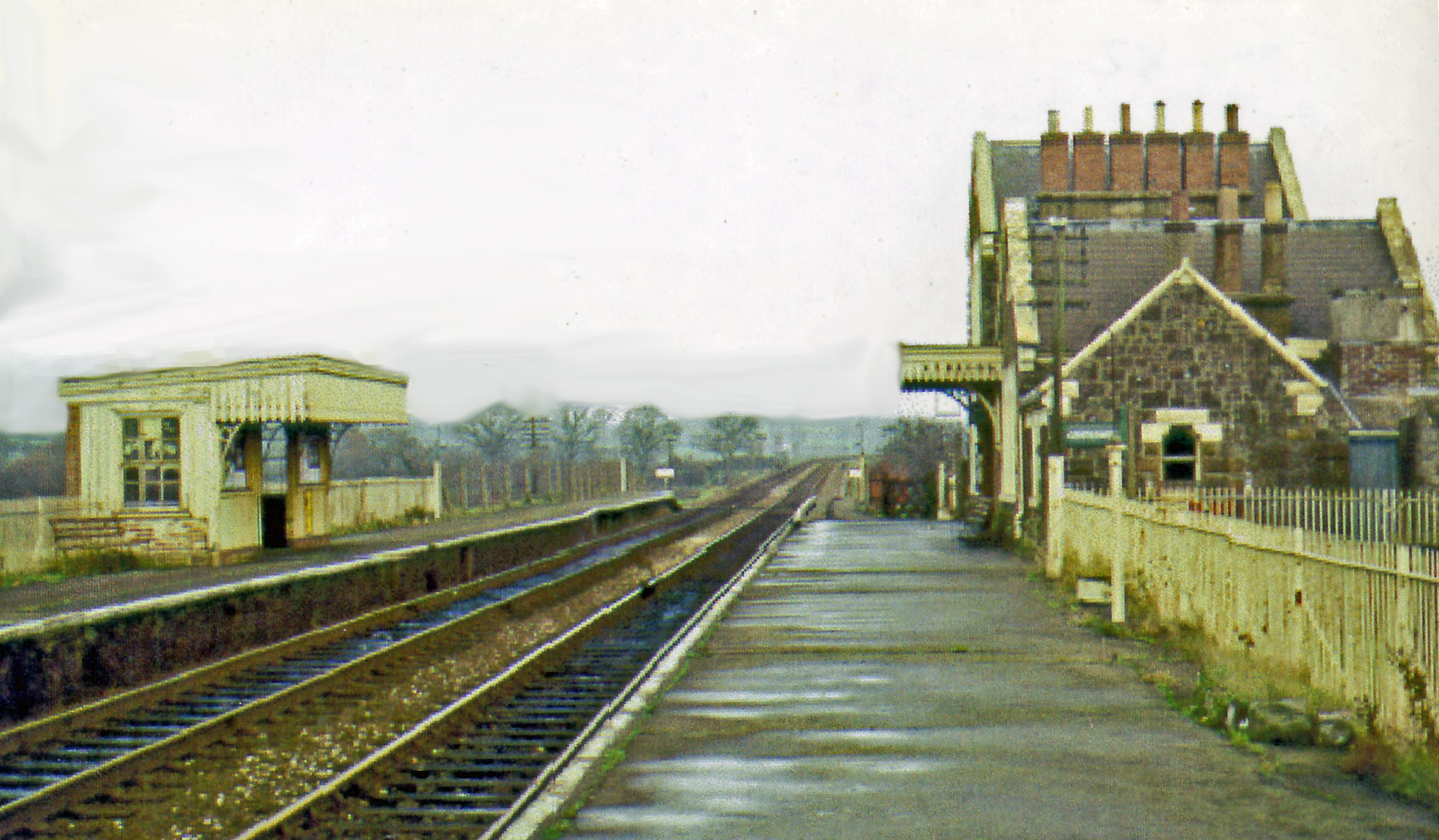
Bow (Devon) station, 1968

Bow railway station was a railway station serving the village of Bow and the hamlet of Nymet Tracy in Devon. Bow lies about 8 miles west of Crediton.

== History ==
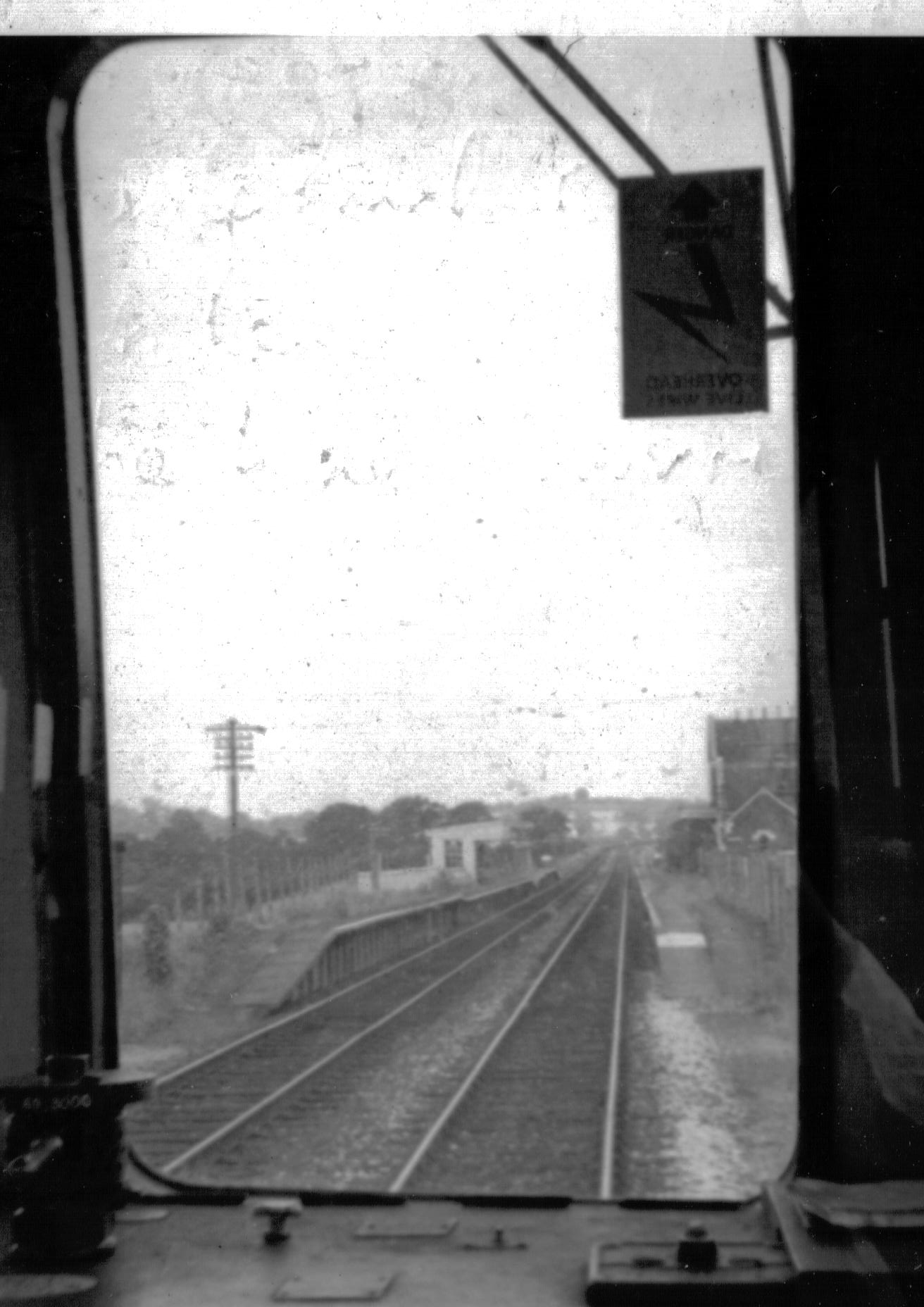
Bow station from the train in 1970.

The station was originally opened by the London and South Western Railway (LSWR) in 1865. The station building is a two-storey construction of Dartmoor granite with ashlar dressings and round headed windows. The platform canopy has cast iron brackets with a creeper design. There is also a single-storey waiting room and offices.

Services on the line were extended further west to Lydford railway station with the inauguration of Meldon Viaduct in 1874. Constructed to rival the South Devon Railway route to Plymouth, the completion of the LSWR's own route to Plymouth saw this line become an important route with lines to Padstow and Bude as well as Plymouth. Boat trains carrying passengers from ocean liners calling at Stonehouse Pool, Plymouth and prestige services such as the Atlantic Coast Express and Devon Belle all used the route.

Following publication of the Beeching Report in 1963, the Exeter to Plymouth Line was cut back to Okehampton in 1968. The line was singled on 17 October 1971.

Bow, North Tawton, Sampford Courtenay and Okehampton lost their regular passenger services from 1972. The line survived, however, for the purposes of freight thanks to the activities of the British Rail ballast quarry at Meldon, three miles from Okehampton, which had an output of 300,000 tons per year. The quarry survived until the 2000s, operated by Aggregate Industries. British American Railway Services, a new company created by Iowa Pacific Holdings of Chicago, became the new owner of the Dartmoor line on 4 September 2008. The company sought to develop freight, passenger and tourist services on the railway. Subsequently, infrastructure ownership transferred to Network Rail and on 20 November 2021 regular passenger services between Exeter and Okehampton resumed, operated by Great Western Railway. Crediton and Newton St Cyres (limited service) were the only intermediate stops on that service until Okehampton Interchange Station opened.

Preceding station		Following station
North Tawton	British Rail Western Region Exeter to Plymouth Line	Yeoford

== Future options ==
The Dartmoor Railway formerly proposed to restore the interchange at Yeoford, running passenger trains past Bow, where its line meets Great Western Railway's Tarka Line.
