= Bow, Devon =

Village in Devon, England

Coordinates: 50°48′00″N 3°48′54″W

Bow
- Location within Devon
- Population: 1,120
- OS grid reference: SX8156
- District: Mid Devon
- Shire county: Devon
- Region: South West
- Country: England
- Sovereign state: United Kingdom
- Post town: Crediton
- Postcode district: EX17
- Police: Devon and Cornwall
- Fire: Devon and Somerset
- Ambulance: South Western
- UK Parliament: Central Devon

Bow (/boʊ/) is a village and civil parish in the Mid Devon district of Devon, England, about 8 miles (13 km) west of Crediton. According to the 2021 census, it had a population of 1,120, which was slightly more than the 1,095 recorded at the 2011 Census. There is an adjoining hamlet of Nymet Tracey which shares a church with Bow and much common history. Bow is a major part of Upper Yeo electoral ward. The total ward population at the 2011 census was 1,708.

== History ==
There is a 3rd millennium BC woodhenge west of the village. Its 19 post holes were discovered by aerial photography in 1984. It is believed to have been a centre of pagan worship for a large area of surrounding countryside. The name Nymet means "Sacred Grove" in Celtic and is associated in Roman terms with the Druids. The word Nymet is preserved in many surrounding place names (e.g. Nymet Barton, Nymet Rowland, Broad Nymet). The River Yeo, which used to be called the Nymet, flows through the "arched bridge" at the bottom of the village.

The main settlement was originally at Nymet Tracey, one mile (1.6 km) south of Bow's present location. Nymet Tracey had parliamentary representation in late Anglo-Saxon times, from 940 onwards and is mentioned in the Domesday Book of 1086.

The name Tracey comes from the 'de Tracey' family – from Tracy-sur-Mer near Bayeux – which settled in the area after the Norman Conquest of 1066. The face of a de Tracey knight is carved over the south entrance to the church at Nymet Tracey. The knight may be a representation of William de Tracy, who is said to have who founded the church in penance for the murder of Thomas Becket, although there is no independent evidence for this beyond local tradition. The church is dedicated to St Bartholomew, and has been since at least 1742. It may have previously been dedicated to St Mary, or St Martin.

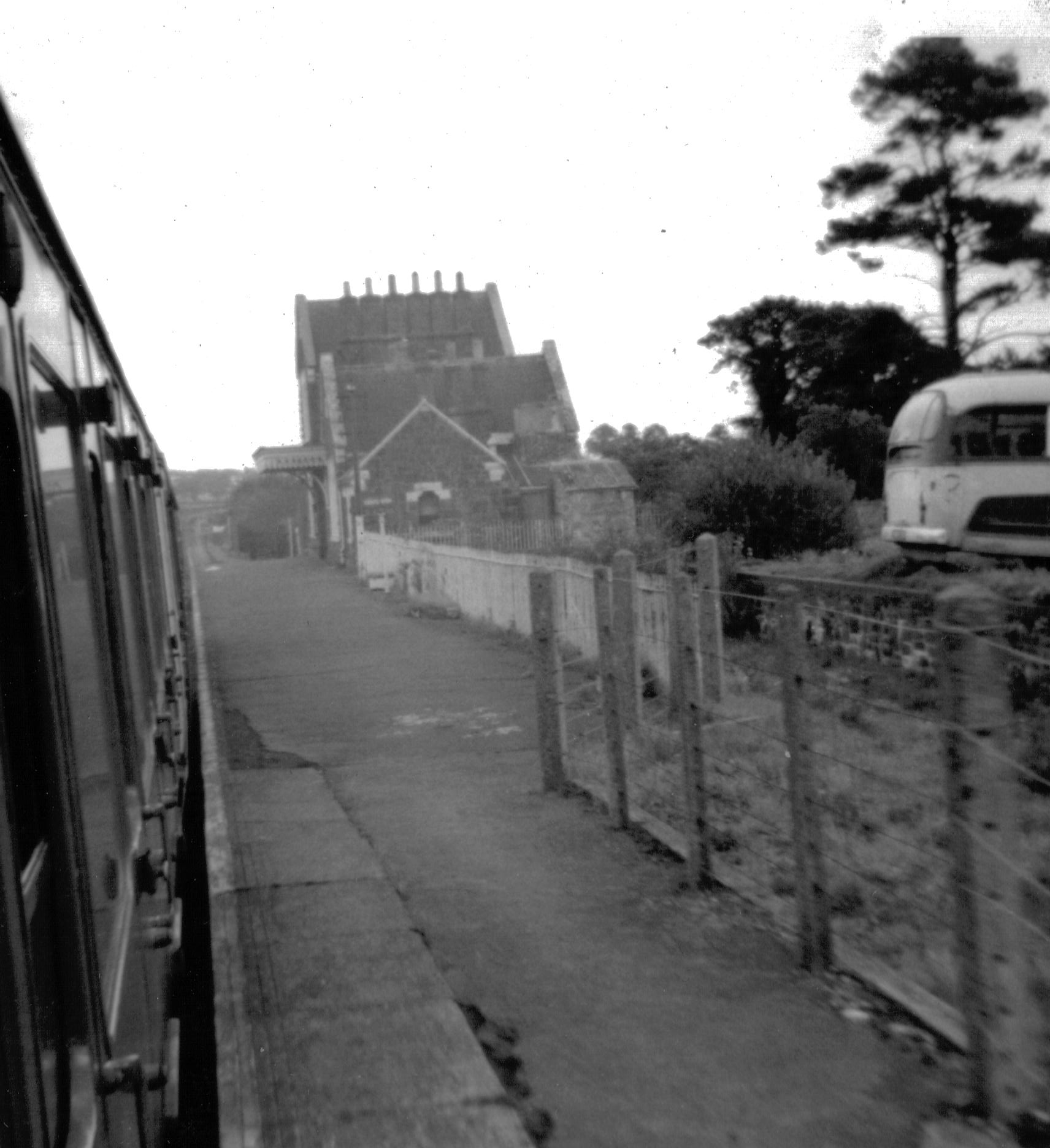
Bow railway station in 1970

In 1258-59 Henry de Tracey was granted charters for a weekly market and a three-day annual fair starting on St Martin's Day. The market was held on the main Crediton to Okehampton road (now the A3072), and so Bow was born. The A3072 road is almost certainly a Roman road, although not the first in the area. The first was south of the village, and runs from the Roman fort at North Tawton to Isca (Exeter).

Charles I stayed one night in Bow during the Civil War when he was chasing the Earl of Essex into Cornwall.

Bow, due to its location, failed to attract enough trade to justify its status as a town and remained a street village or one of Devon's many "failed towns". The market ceased in 1792. Nymet Tracey was effectively absorbed into Bow following two fires which destroyed Nymet Tracey (then about 60-80 cottages) in 1833 and 1835, after which the bulk of the populace of Nymet Tracey moved to Bow. Nymet Tracey's church, St Martin's at the time, continued to serve Bow. The influx of people did not halt its decline and by 1850 Bow/Nymet Tracey was described as a "small, decayed market town"; the St Martin's Day fair, first recorded in 1259, ceased c.1900.

In the late 19th and early 20th centuries Bow was spiritually divided between the Church of England, the Congregationalists and the Plymouth Brethren.

== Today ==
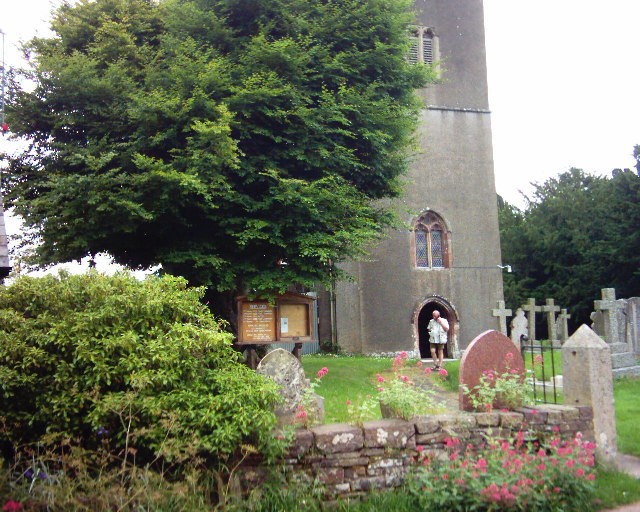
St Bartholomew's, 2005

In addition to St Bartholomew's (Church of England), Bow has both a Congregational Church and a Gospel Hall (Open Brethren). Its railway station, like so many others, fell victim to the Beeching Axe in the early 1970s.

In recent years Bow has expanded considerably to the south. Bow has Mid Devon Caravans, a general store (Co-Op), and garden centre (Bow Garden & Aquatic Centre, with a Waterside Cafe), a concrete company (Edworthy’s Concrete), a doctor's surgery and one public house. It has a community policeman. There is a local school, Bow Community Primary School.
