= Umberleigh railway station =

Railway station in Devon, England

Umberleigh
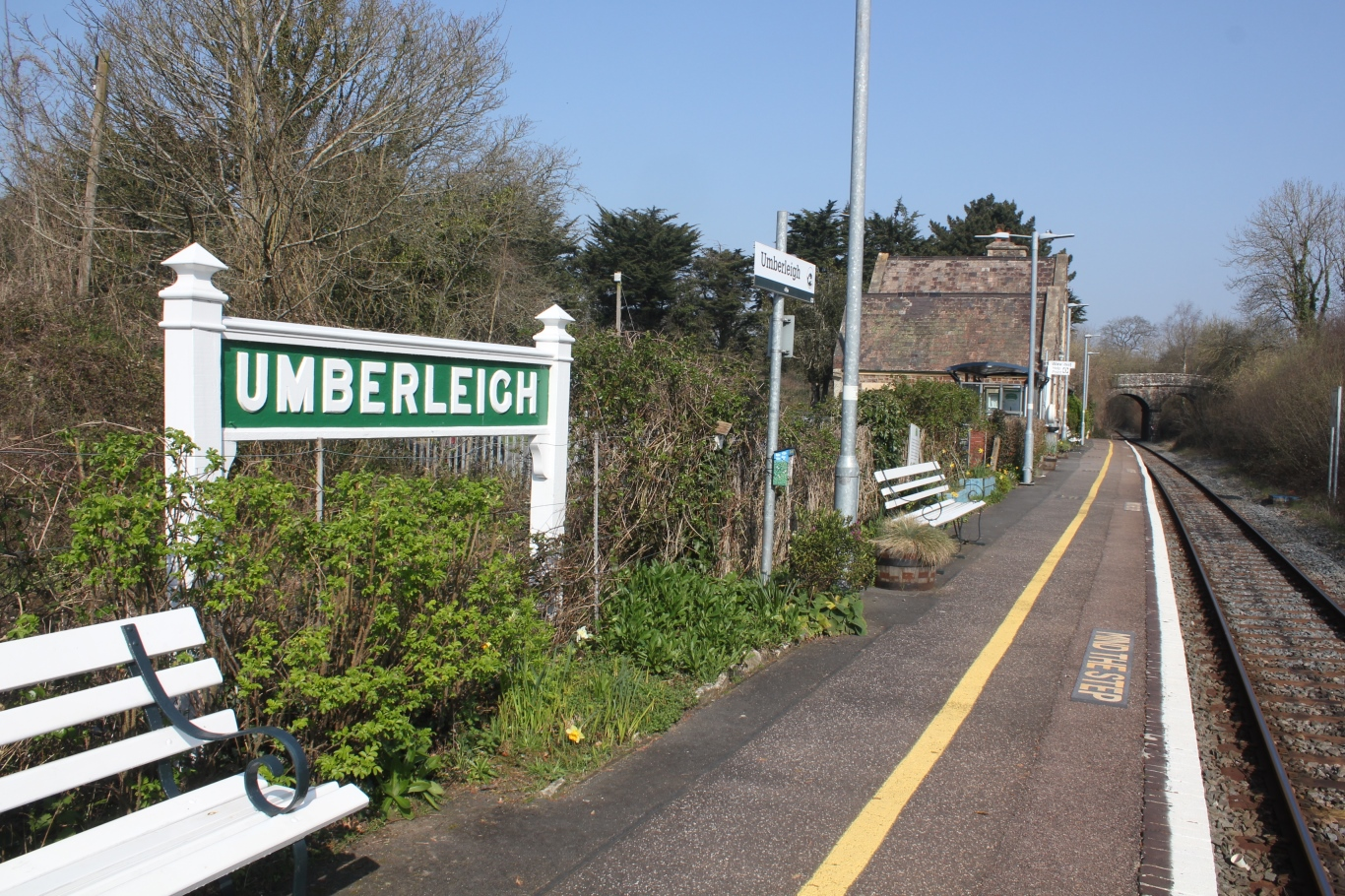
- Looking north towards Barnstaple

General information
- Location: Umberleigh, North Devon; England
- Coordinates: 50.99620°N 3.98306°W
- Grid reference: SS609238
- Manager: Great Western Railway
- Platforms: 1

Other information
- Station code: UMB
- Classification: DfT category F2

History
- Original company: North Devon Railway
- Pre-grouping: London and South Western Railway
- Post-grouping: Southern Railway

Key dates
- Opened: 1 August 1854

Passengers
- 2021/22: ▲32,796
- 2022/23: ▲45,908
- 2023/24: ▲49,642
- 2024/25: ▲54,078
- 2025/26: ▼44,604
Location
Notes
- Passenger statistics from the Office of Rail and Road

Umberleigh railway station serves the village of Umberleigh in Devon, England. It is on the Tarka Line to Barnstaple, 33 miles 22 chains (53.6 km) from Exeter Central at milepost 205.75 from London Waterloo.

== History ==
The station was opened by the North Devon Railway on 1 August 1854. The railway was single track. Although there was a passing loop at Umberleigh there was only a platform on the western track during the first few years. The main goods yard and cattle pens were on this side of the line at the south end of the station. A goods shed with a 2 ton crane was situated on a short siding at the other end of the platform. There was another short siding beyond the road bridge which also had a crane which could lift 5 tons.

A signal box was opened on 1 October 1873 but this was replaced on 19 October 1890 when the line towards Barnstaple was given a second track. The goods yard closed on 4 January 1965. The line was singled and the signal box closed on 21 May 1971.

A camping coach was available for hire in the main goods yard from 1935 to 1939 and again from 1962 to 1964.

== Description ==
Umberleigh station is situated next to a bridge that carries the B3277 road from South Molton near its junction with the A377 Exeter to Barnstaple road. There is a small car park.

The single platform, which is long enough for a 7 coach train, is on the west side of the track. There is a waiting shelter for passengers but the former station master's house is in private use. The disused platform on the opposite side of the track can still be seen.

== Services ==
All services at Umberleigh are operated by Great Western Railway. There is generally one train per hour in each direction between Barnstaple and Exeter Central but a very small number of services continue to or from other routes in East Devon on weekdays. All call at Umberleigh but only on request to the conductor or by signalling the driver as it approaches.

Preceding station	National Rail	Following station
Chapelton towards Barnstaple	Great Western Railway Tarka Line	Portsmouth Arms towards Exeter Central

== Community railway ==
The railway between Exeter and Barnstaple is designated as a community railway and is supported by marketing provided by the Devon and Cornwall Rail Partnership. The line is promoted as the Tarka Line.
