= Copplestone railway station =

Railway station in Devon, England

Copplestone
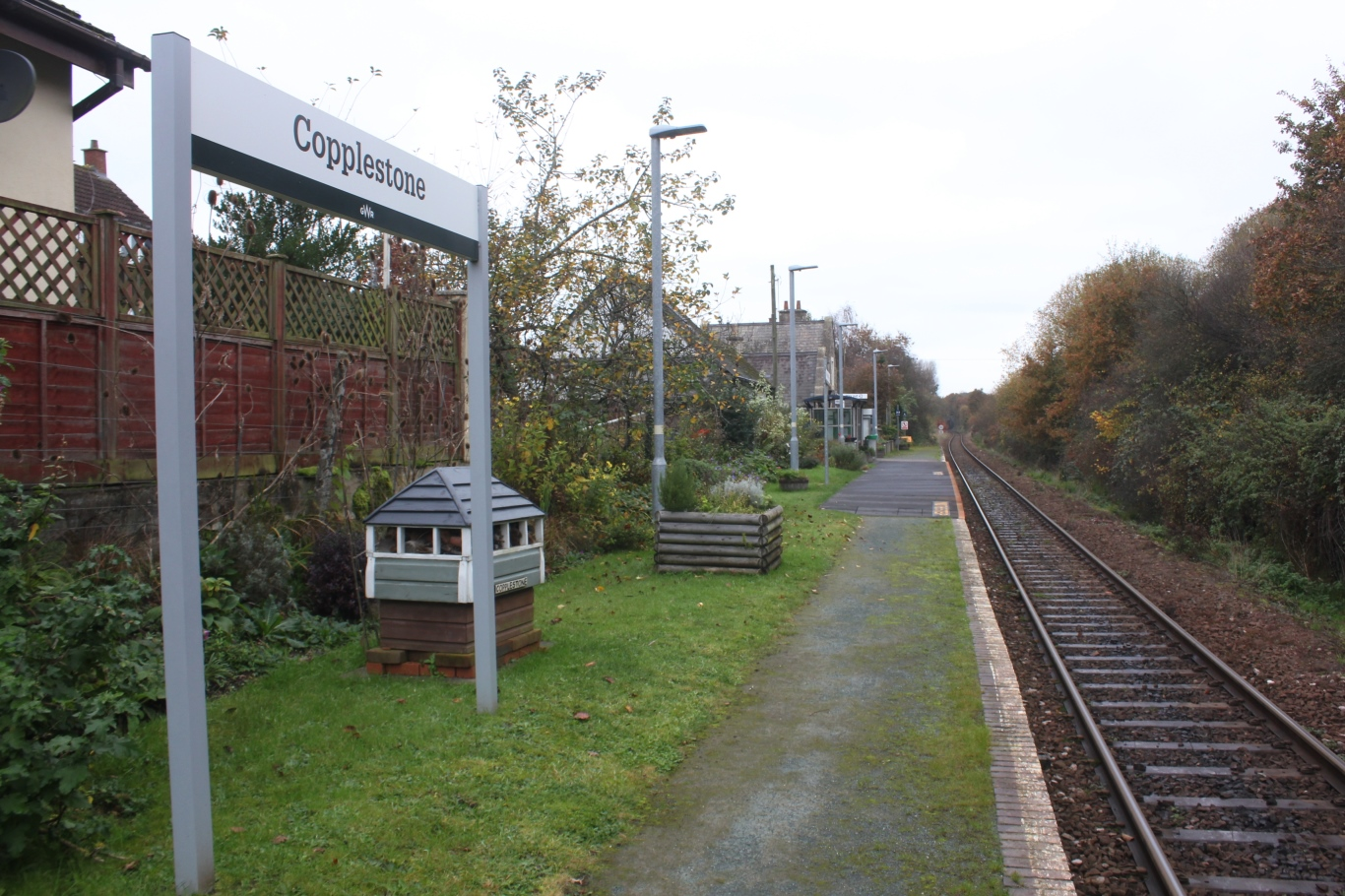
- Looking towards Barnstaple in 2021

General information
- Location: Copplestone, Mid Devon; England
- Coordinates: 50.814°N 3.752°W
- Grid reference: SS767031
- Manager: Great Western Railway
- Platforms: 1

Other information
- Station code: COP
- Classification: DfT category F2

History
- Original company: North Devon Railway
- Pre-grouping: London and South Western Railway
- Post-grouping: Southern Railway

Key dates
- Opened: 1854

Passengers
- 2021/22: ▲23,068
- 2022/23: ▲30,380
- 2023/24: ▲35,014
- 2024/25: ▲41,732
- 2025/26: ▼39,452
Location
Notes
- Passenger statistics from the Office of Rail and Road

Copplestone railway station is on the Tarka Line serving the village of Copplestone in Devon, England. It is on the Tarka Line to Barnstaple between Yeoford and Morchard Road, 185 miles 75 chains (299.2 km) from London Waterloo, measured via Andover. The station and trains are operated by Great Western Railway. The station is on the northern edge of Copplestone.

== History ==
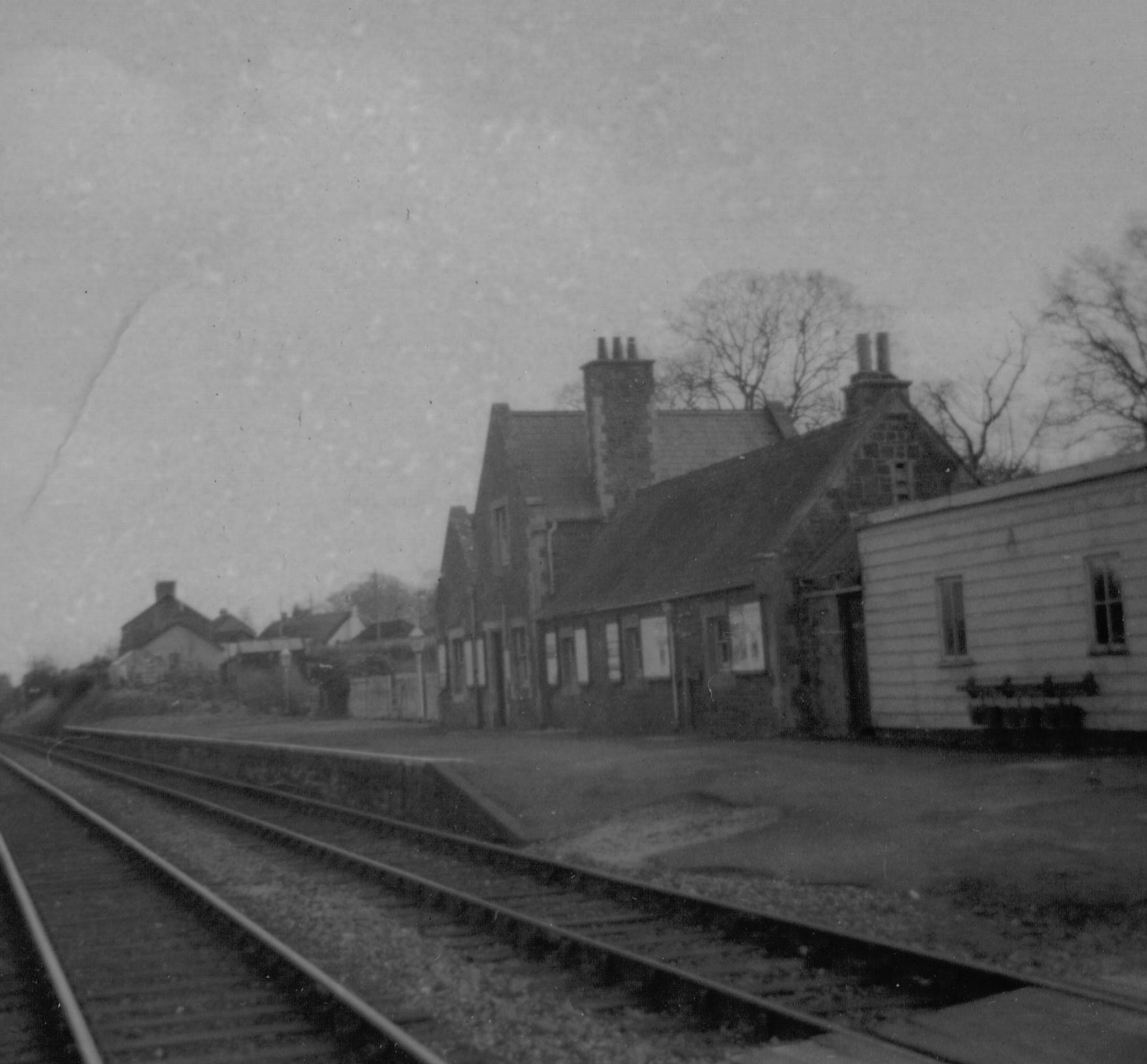
Copplestone station in 1969

The station was opened by the North Devon Railway on 1 August 1854. The railway was single track. A passing loop was provided at Copplestone but there was initially only one platform. A second platform was added and in 1873 a ten-lever signal box was built at the northern end of the new platform where there was a view of the goods yard on the other side of the line. Ten years later the line from Copplestone to Yeoford was doubled, the second track being ready for use on 4 November 1883.

The goods yard closed on 6 September 1965. The double track was taken out of use on 17 October 1971 and the signal box closed. The remains of the second platform can still be seen but there is no track on that side of the station.

Rail campaign group Railfuture propose that Copplestone should have improved parking and public transport facilities, to provide connections to other local communities in the area, including Bow.

=== 1861 accident ===
On 16 July 1861 the 06:30 train from Bideford was waiting at the platform when the 07:45 train from Exeter St Davids was routed onto the same line. Thirteen passengers and a guard on the second train were injured in the collision. The signalman was imprisoned for a month after admitting causing the accident during a lapse of concentration. The points and signals were not interlocked at that time, but a second platform was added and in 1873 a ten-lever signal box was built at the northern end of the new platform where there was a view of the goods yard on the other side of the line. Ten years later the line from Copplestone to Yeoford was doubled, the second track being ready for use on 4 November 1883.

== Facilities ==
The station has a small car park and cycle storage, a shelter and a help point. As there are no facilities to purchase tickets, passengers must buy one in advance, or from the guard on the train.

== Services ==
All services at Copplestone are operated by Great Western Railway. There is generally one train per hour in each direction between Barnstaple and Exeter Central but a very small number of services continue to or from other routes in East Devon on weekdays.

Preceding station	National Rail	Following station
Morchard Road towards Barnstaple	Great Western Railway Tarka Line	Yeoford towards Exeter Central

== Community railway ==
The railway between Exeter and Barnstaple is designated as a community railway and is supported by marketing provided by the Devon and Cornwall Rail Partnership. The line is promoted as the Tarka Line.

== Passenger volume ==
Passenger volume at Copplestone
	2004–05	2005–06	2006–07	2007–08	2008–09	2009–10	2010–11	2011–12	2012–13	2013–14	2014–15	2015–16	2016–17	2017–18	2018–19	2019–20	2020–21	2021–22	2022–23	2023–24	2024–25
Entries and exits	356	1,090	2,283	4,563	7,422	8,164	10,024	12,682	10,990	14,058	13,476	12,304	13,522	15,262	17,868	19,438	8,662	23,068	30,380	35,014	41,732

The statistics cover twelve month periods that start in April.

== Bibliography ==
- Wills, Dixe (2014). Tiny Stations (Paperback, 1st reprint ed.). Basingstoke: AA Publishing. ISBN 978-0-7495-7732-2.
