= Tarka Line =

Railway line in Devon, England

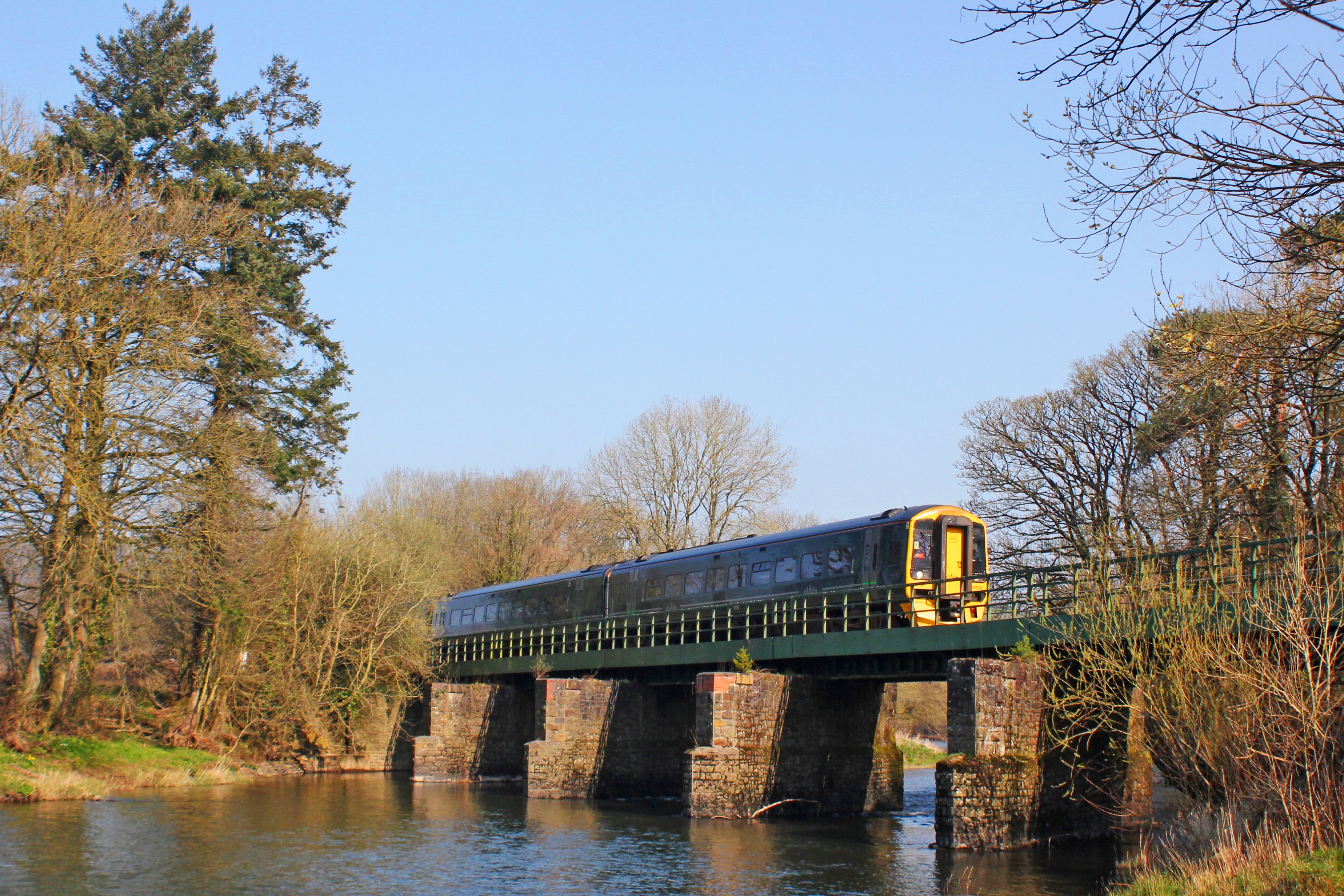
- Crossing the River Taw at Umberleigh

Overview
- Status: Open
- Owner: Network Rail
- Locale: Devon, England
- Termini: Exeter St Davids, (Note: Location: 50.7291°N 3.5438°W); Barnstaple (Note: Location: 51.0740°N 4.0635°W)
- Stations: 13

Service
- Type: Community rail
- System: National Rail
- Operator: Great Western Railway
- Depot: Exeter TMD
- Ridership: 0.758 million (2023)

History
- Opened: 1851–1854

Technical
- Line length: 39 mi (62.76 km)
- Track gauge: 1,435 mm (4 ft 8 1/2 in) standard gauge
- Old gauge: 7 ft 1/4 in (2,140 mm) Brunel gauge
Route map
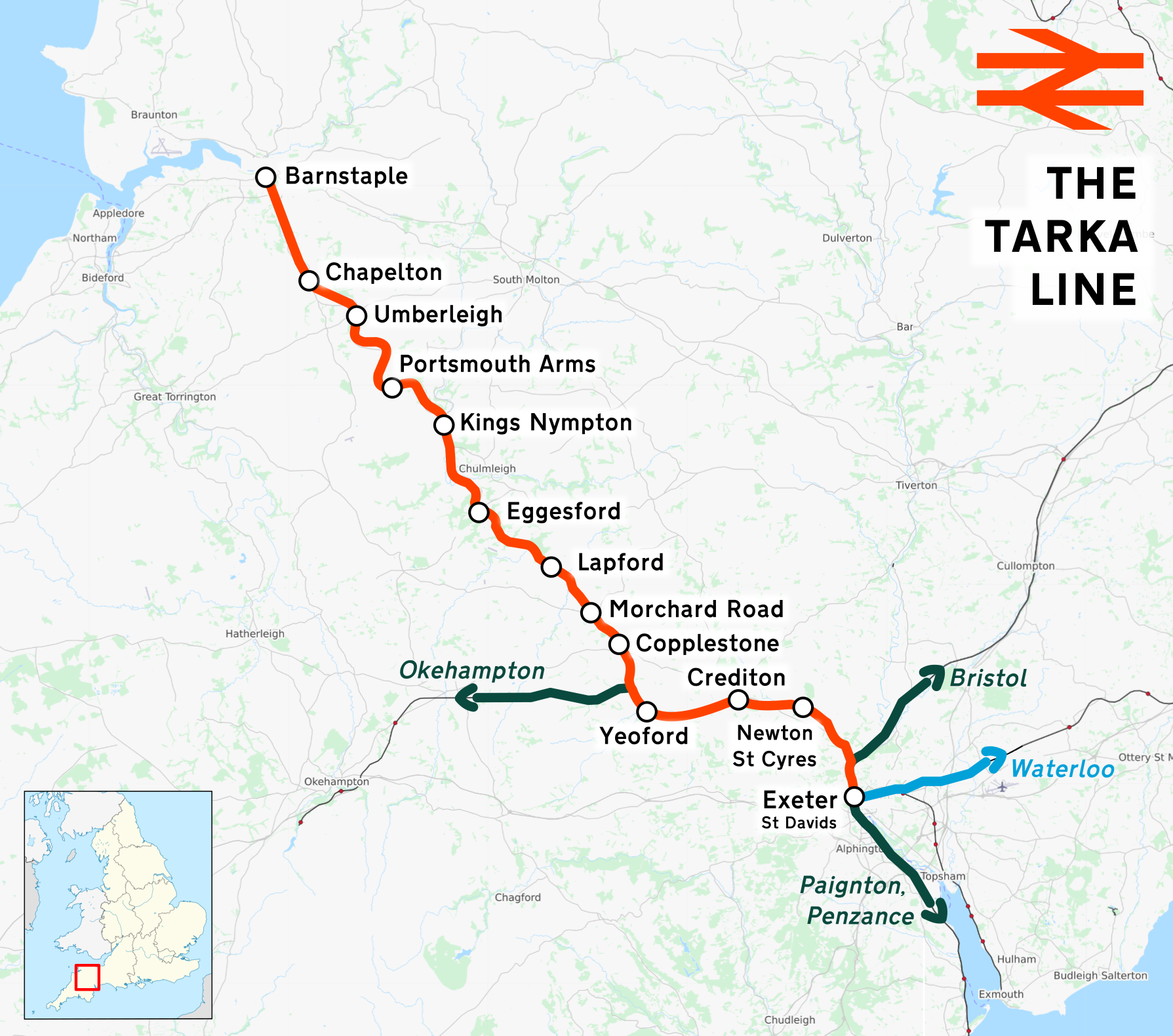
(Click to expand)

The Tarka Line, also known as the North Devon Line, is a local railway line in Devon, England. It links the city of Exeter with the town of Barnstaple and is operated by Great Western Railway. The line opened between Exeter and Crediton in 1851; it was completed through to Barnstaple in 1854. The line was taken over by the London and South Western Railway (LSWR) in 1865; it later became part of the Southern Railway and then British Rail. In 2001, following privatisation, Wessex Trains introduced the name Tarka Line, after the eponymous character in Henry Williamson's book Tarka the Otter. The line was transferred to First Great Western in 2006.

It is one of the railway lines supported by the Devon and Cornwall Rail Partnership and passenger numbers on the line have more than tripled since 2001.

== History ==
=== Background and construction ===
The first proposals relating to what would become the Tarka Line originated in the 1820s, when it was proposed that a railway line might be built from Crediton to Exeter Quay. Authority was obtained to build this line by the Exeter and Crediton Railway Act 1832 (2 & 3 Will. 4. c. xciii), but construction never started and the powers lapsed. However, business interests in Crediton became interested in a railway again after allies of the Great Western Railway (GWR), the Bristol and Exeter Railway (B&ER), reached Exeter in 1844, and the GWR-allied South Devon Railway started extending that line to Plymouth. In 1844, the Exeter and Crediton Railway (E&CR) was formed and a proposal was put forward for a new line to connect Crediton to the B&ER. This proposal was accepted and authority was granted by the Exeter and Crediton Railway Act 1845 (8 & 9 Vict. c. lxxxviii). The new company had capital of £70,000 (around £8.5 million in today's money) and made arrangements with the B&ER for the latter's trains to run to Crediton along the former's tracks.

Meanwhile, a proposal from business interests in Barnstaple was put forward in 1845 to build a new line connecting their town to the B&ER at Exeter. However, these proposals were rejected by the Railway Commission under Lord Dalhousie, the so-called "Five Kings", who wished to defer the decision on linking Barnstaple to the national railway network in order to appraise an alternative proposal by the B&ER to construct a line that would run between Barnstaple and their station at Tiverton.

By January 1846, construction had started on the E&CR and on an unrelated line connecting Barnstaple with Fremington Quay, five miles to the west, and this created a new sense of urgency in connecting Barnstaple to the national network. Two proposals to reach Barnstaple were put forwards: an east-west route from Tiverton to Bideford, via mid-Devon and Barnstaple; and a north-south route from Barnstaple to Crediton (with access to Exeter along the E&CR). The Tiverton option had Isambard Kingdom Brunel as its engineer, was favoured by the GWR, and had backing from the Five Kings and the Lord Lieutenant of Devonshire, Hugh Fortescue, 2nd Earl Fortescue. Meanwhile, the LSWR had long-term ambitions to challenge the GWR's dominance in the south-west and they backed the rival Crediton option, installing John Locke as its engineer.

GWR failed to submit their plans in line with the standing orders and so Parliament rejected them, authorising the Crediton route despite the recommendations of Dalhousie's commission and the preference of the Lord Lieutenant. The Taw Vale Railway and Dock Act 1846 (9 & 10 Vict. c. ccclv) created the LSWR-allied Taw Vale Extension Railway (TVER). In 1847, the GWR party tried and failed to agree a lease of the TVER's line to the B&ER. In the same year, the LSWR party purchased a majority stake in the E&CR and then leased the E&CR line to the TVER. The E&CR board, led by a J.W. Buller, remained aligned to the B&ER until Buller was removed that year (amid a procedural controversy that resulted in an unsuccessful appeal to the Five Kings). At the same time, construction continued on the E&CR, and by the end of 1847, the line was complete except for a connection to the B&ER. Given the departure of Buller, the E&CR directors conceded that an agreement with the B&ER would be impossible and ordered that the line be converted to the LSWR's narrow gauge and a station be constructed at Cowley Bridge.

As for the TVER, the end of Railway Mania had left it without funding and the Taw Vale Railway and Dock Act 1846 had left the decision on its gauge to the Railway Commission, who in 1848 announced it would be in broad gauge. Four days later, the conversion of the E&CR was complete. Thus, in 1848, construction had not yet started on the Crediton to Barnstaple line, there was no capital available, and it would have to be constructed in a gauge that would make through trains to Exeter impossible. Meanwhile, the commission also told the LSWR that they would not be permitted to construct a line linking the Cowley Bridge to Exeter, leaving the E&CR completely isolated.

=== Nineteenth century ===
The deadlock was broken in 1851 by William Chapman, chairman of the LSWR and the E&CR. He agreed to convert one of the two tracks on the Crediton line to broad gauge and lease the line to B&ER; in exchange, the B&ER agreed to construct a junction allowing trains to run from Crediton to Exeter St Davids, and Cowley Bridge station was never opened.

A service commenced of seven trains a day in each direction, the first trains to run on the future Tarka Line, and new stations opened to passengers at Newton St Cyres and Crediton. In the same year, new company the North Devon Railway (NDR) was formed to replace the financially failed TVER and construction started on the Crediton–Barnstaple section. The NDR opened in 1854 with stations at Yeoford, Copplestone, Morchard Road, Lapford, Eggesford, South Molton Road, Portsmouth Arms, Umberleigh and Barnstaple, with a siding at Chappletown. However, the track south of Crediton continued to be owned by the E&CR. The NDR was taken over by the LSWR in 1865 and, while the E&CR remained nominally independent, the majority of its shares were owned by the LSWR and the B&ER. The section south of Crediton became part of the LSWR in 1876.

=== Twentieth century ===
Following the passage of the Railways Act 1921, the LSWR was merged into the Southern Railway and, in 1948, this became the Southern Region of British Rail. Along with the LSWR line to Plymouth, the route was part of the "withered arm" of Southern routes in predominantly Great Western Railway (and subsequently Western Region) territory.

=== Privatisation ===
From 13 October 1996, services on the Tarka Line were operated by Wales & West (owned by Prism Rail) as part of their franchise. National Express purchased Wales & West from Prism Rail in July 2000 and, on 14 October 2001, it rebranded Wales & West as Wessex Trains after the Strategic Rail Authority transferred the company's Welsh services to Wales and Borders.

The line was transferred to First Great Western in 2006, which rebranded as Great Western Railway in 2015; it introduced the line's current fleet and service pattern in December 2019.

== Stations ==
There are 12 stations along the line, although trains also serve Exeter St Davids and Exeter Central. Crediton and Newton St Cyres are also served by Dartmoor line services to Okehampton.

Crediton and Eggesford stations are both Listed grade II, as is an old railway warehouse outside Barnstaple station.

| Image | Station | Distance (Note: Distances in miles and chains from Exeter Central taken from Jacobs (2005)) | Opened | Daily trains (Note: Trains to Exeter, Monday to Friday from the GWR timetable in May 2022) | Usage 2009–10 (Note: The passenger usage is based on sales of tickets in stated financial years from Office of Rail and Road estimates of station usage. The statistics are for passengers arriving and departing from each station and cover a twelve-month period that starts in April.) | Usage 2019–20 | Usage 2023–24 |
|---|---|---|---|---|---|---|---|
| | Newton St Cyres (Note: Newton St Cyres was known as only Newton until 1913.) | 4m 21ch | 1851 | 12 | 1,784 | 2,684 | 6,776 |
| | Crediton | 7m 76ch | 1851 | 32 | 36,784 | 66,606 | 162,178 |
| | Yeoford | 11m 42ch | 1857 | 17 | 10,504 | 17,236 | 23,358 |
| | Copplestone | 14m 37ch | 1854 | 17 | 8,164 | 19,438 | 35,014 |
| | Morchard Road | 16m 08ch | 1854 | 16 | 6,482 | 14,642 | 20,016 |
| | Lapford | 18m 35ch | 1855 | 8 | 1,878 | 2,078 | 7,660 |
| | Eggesford | 22m 27ch | 1854 | 17 | 22,858 | 32,228 | 44,600 |
| | Kings Nympton (Note: Kings Nympton was named South Molton Road until 1951.) | 26m 21ch | 1854 | 6 | 1,984 | 6,098 | 4,114 |
| | Portsmouth Arms | 29m 08ch | 1855 | 3 | 676 | 502 | 802 |
| | Umberleigh | 33m 22ch | 1854 | 17 | 17,718 | 32,302 | 49,642 |
| | Chapelton (Note: A wooden platform was in use at Chapleton from 1857 until 1860. The permanent station opened in 1875.) | 35m 52ch | 1875 | 2 | 162 | 192 | 186 |
| | Barnstaple (Note: Barnstaple was named Barnstaple Junction from 1874 until 1970.) | 39m 75ch | 1854 | 17 | 302,998 | 424,822 | 549,860 |

== Operation ==
The line is single tracked with passing loops at Crediton and Eggesford. The only signal box is at Crediton. Its semaphore signals and mechanical lever frame were replaced by electric signals and an electric signalling panel on 16 December 1984. Trains between Crediton and Barnstaple are controlled by tokens which ensure there is just one train on the line at any time. Train drivers exchange their token in the No Signalman Token Remote (NSTR) equipment at Eggesford.

== Community rail ==
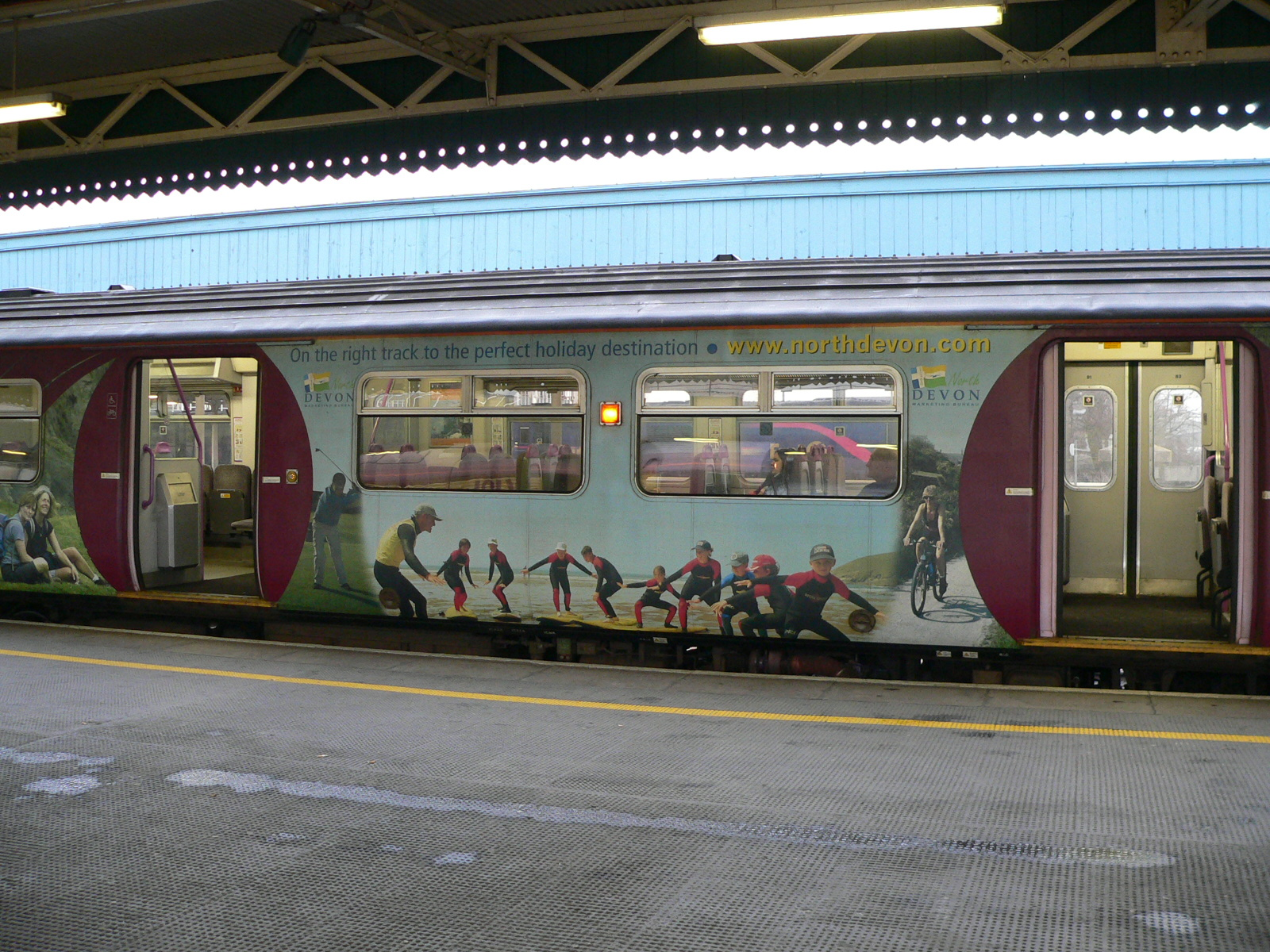
The Tarka Belle at Bristol Temple Meads, March 2006

The Tarka Line is named after the otter in Henry Williamson's book Tarka the Otter which is set in the area. It is one of the railway lines supported by the Devon and Cornwall Rail Partnership, an organisation formed in 1991 to promote railway services in the area. The line is promoted by many means such as regular timetable and scenic line guides, as well as leaflets highlighting leisure opportunities such as walking or visiting country pubs.

The Tarka Line rail ale trail was launched in 2002, the first of several such schemes which encourages rail travellers to visit pubs near the line. The trail originally covered 16 pubs and 11 in 2020; the number has risen and fallen over the years. There are three pubs in Exeter and five in Barnstaple, with one each at Lapford, Portsmouth Arms and Umberleigh. Ten stamps, collected in the Rail Ale Trail leaflet, entitle the participant to claim special Tarka Line Rail Trail souvenir tour shirt.

Sponsored by the North Devon tourist board, Wessex Trains named unit 150241 The Tarka Belle in 2003, and changed its livery to advertising for tourist destinations on the line.

The line was designated by the Department for Transport as a community rail line in September 2006. This aims to increase revenue and reduce costs. Among possible options are increasing the car parking at stations, looking at ways to increase the train frequency and facilities at stations.

== Services ==
Great Western Railway operates services on the line, most with Class 158 diesel multiple units. They operate approximately hourly in each direction; the journey between Exeter Central and Barnstaple takes around 75 minutes.

Off-peak services generally stop at Exeter St. Davids, Crediton, Yeoford (request), Copplestone, Morchard Road (request), Eggesford and Umberleigh (request); only two services each way on weekdays call at all stops on this line. A single service is extended beyond Exeter to Axminster on Monday to Friday evenings, and another operates to and from Exmouth.

== Proposed improvements ==
Network Rail aim to raise the Cowley Bridge during their Control Period 7 (2024-2029). This would reduce the likelihood of the railway being closed or damaged by floods.

The Barnstaple to Bideford route was mentioned in the Association of Train Operating Companies' 2009 Connecting Communities: Expanding Access to the Rail Network report, which recommended some closed lines that could be rebuilt to restore railway services to large communities. Following the reopening of the Dartmoor line to Okehampton in 2021, a local 'Atlantic Coast to Exeter' campaign resumed interest in reopening the line from Barnstaple to Bideford.

== See also ==
- Tarka Trail
- West of England Main Line
