= Tarka Valley Railway =

Heritage railway in Devon, England

Coordinates: 51°01′10″N 04°13′35″W

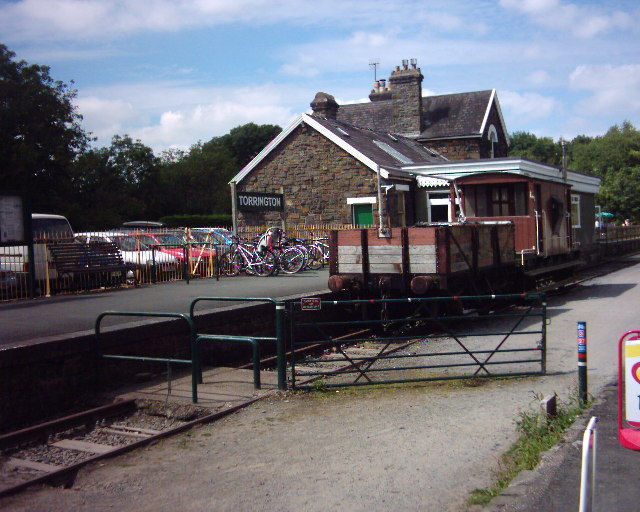
- Torrington Railway Station
- Terminus: Torrington

Commercial operations
- Built by: North Devon Railway
- Original gauge: 1,435 mm (4 ft 8 1/2 in) standard gauge

Preserved operations
- Stations: 1
- Length: 300 yards (274 m)
- Preserved gauge: 1,435 mm (4 ft 8 1/2 in) standard gauge

Commercial history
- Opened: 1872
- Closed: 25 January 1983

Preservation history
- 2008: Railway society formed
- 2013: Planning approved for 300 yards (274 metres) of track
- 2023: Phase 1 complete, Phase 2 at the planning stage
- Headquarters: Torrington

Website
- www.tarkavalleyrailway.org

The Tarka Valley Railway in Devon, England, is a heritage railway that plans to rebuild the Torrington to Bideford section of the Barnstaple to Halwill Junction railway line. So far a short demonstration line of 300 yd (274 metres) of track in the direction of Bideford plus a siding alongside the old coal dock have been re-laid. The railway has been fenced off from the Tarka Trail ensuring the safety of all involved. Restoration of various items of rolling stock is currently under way.

== History of the line ==
Built by the North Devon Railway, it opened on 18 July 1872, operated by the London and South Western Railway. Torrington railway station operated services to Bideford and Barnstaple, as well as to Exeter St Davids. From 1880 the line connected with the narrow gauge freight only Torrington and Marland Railway. On grouping in 1923 the Torrington to Barnstaple line became part of the Southern Railway (SR). In 1925 the Torrington and Marland Railway was rebuilt as a standard gauge line and opened through to Halwill Junction as the North Devon and Cornwall Junction Light Railway. A passenger service operated until 1965, when the line again reverted to carrying goods only, until the line through Torrington was closed completely.

=== Milk trains ===
The SR and later the Southern Region of British Railways ran two regular milk trains up from Torrington every day, which served both the United Dairies creamery and bottling plant at Vauxhall and the Express Dairies creamery at Morden (both in London). Filled by road tankers from the Torridge Vale Dairies, the first train (of eight wagons) left Torrington at 14:47, the second (of six) at 16:37, split due to the weight of the full milk tank wagons. The first train arrived at Clapham Junction in the evening, and reduced its length by half so that it did not block Vauxhall station while unloading. It would then proceed to Vauxhall, and pull into the "down" side platform, where a discharge pipe was provided to the creamery on the other side of the road. There was also pedestrian access from below the station, under the road to the depot, in the tunnel where the pipeline ran. Unloaded trains would then proceed to Waterloo, where they would reverse and return to Clapham Junction to pick up the other half of the train. The procedure was then repeated, so that the entire first milk train was unloaded between the end of evening peak traffic and the start of the following morning. The second train from Torrington would also split at Clapham Junction, but only half of its milk tanks would be hauled to Vauxhall, while the other half were dispatched to the Express Dairies depot at Morden. In the late morning, both trains with empty milk tanks would be combined into one express train, and returned to Torrington. Milk trains from Torrington stopped in 1978, the last milk train on the former SR.

== Closure ==
Torrington railway station was closed for regular passenger services in 1965 under the Beeching Axe. Due to both the china clay and the milk train traffic, freight trains and the occasional passenger special used the line until 1982.

After full closure, the station building was converted to a public house, which it still is.

== Preservation ==
During the 1990s the track was lifted and the station became a public house. The former track bed was not to be built on, in case British Rail decided it wanted to rebuild the line. The ownership of the line was transferred to Devon County Council, who turned it into a cycle trail. The owner of the public house 'The Puffing Billy' started to acquire rolling stock and a small diesel locomotive, and in 2008 the Tarka Valley Railway Group was formed. In 2013 the railway gained planning approval to relay 300 yards (270 m) of track in the direction of Bideford. After the completion of the Phase 1 of the project, the railway is now in the planning stage for Phase 2 which would see the line extend to the first bridge over the River Torridge with the provision of a halt.

In August 2023, the preservation society ran their first train along the 300-yard (270 m) section of track.

=== Rolling stock ===
Locomotives
Name & Number	Image	Notes
4000001 "Progress"		Built 1945 by John Fowler manufacturers number 4000001. 60 hp (45 kW) 6-cylinder Leyland diesel engine installed in 1977. Hydrostatic drive and braking with Westinghouse air brakes as a secondary system. Progress is currently operational.
544998 "Torrington Cavalier"		Ruston Hornsby last one built in 1969. Ran on diesel-electric power for the first time in April 2021.

Diesel Multiple Units
Name & Number	Image	Notes
British Rail Class 143 143617 Rod Garner		Arrived at the railway on 16 November 2022. Currently painted in GWR green

Wagons And Coaches
Number	Image	Notes
BR Mk1 TSO 3924		Used as a crew mess room with plans to turn into a museum, painted in BR Green.
PO 653 4 wheel oil tank		Restored in Bideford Gas and Coke Co. livery
BR 743169 China clay wagon		
BR 954681 Toadfit brake van		Under restoration. going to be used for brake van rides
London Passenger Transport Board HW 402 Steel Hoppper "Dogfish"		Arrived July 2022 from the Swanage Railway
BR 774178 4 wheel ventilated goods van		Body only. used as a workshop.

=== Future ===
Now that Phase 1 which was to lay 300 yards (270 m) of track with an adjacent siding and to expand the railways presence in the station area with the erection of a new Shop and Visitor Centre has been completed, Phase 2 is now in the planning stage. This will see the line extended by approximately another 300 yards (270 m) to the first bridge over the River Torridge, here a halt will be constructed to enable passengers to explore the remains of the former Rolle Canal. They are also working towards plans to convert the BR Mk1 TSO into a static museum and education space.

== See also ==
- Other local railway attractions:
  - Lynton and Barnstaple Railway
  - Lynton and Lynmouth Cliff Railway
  - Dartmoor Railway
  - Bideford Railway Heritage Centre
