= Instow railway station =

Disused railway station in Devon, England

Instow
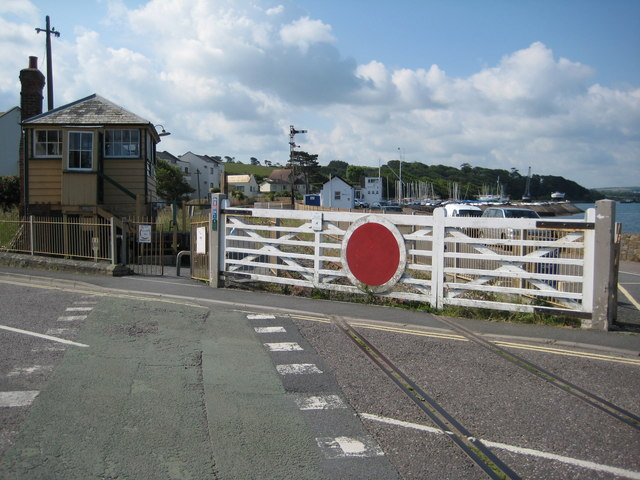
- Level crossing at Instow

General information
- Location: Devon; England
- Coordinates: 51.049°N 4.179°W
- Grid reference: SS474301
- Elevation: 21 feet (6.4 m)
- Platforms: 2
- Tracks: 2

Other information
- Status: Closed

History
- Opened: 2 November 1855
- Closed: 4 October 1965
- Original company: North Devon Railway (1855)
- Pre-grouping: London and South Western Railway (1865)
- Post-grouping: Southern railway (1923)
Location

Instow railway station was a railway station in the village of Instow, North Devon, England, on the Bideford Extension of the North Devon Railway. Opened in November 1855, the station closed to passengers in 1965, but the line remained open for freight until 1982. The signal box has been preserved as a working attraction. The Atlantic Coast Express used to go through the station on its way to Torrington, but it did not call at Instow.

== History ==
The North Devon Bideford Extension Railway was opened on 29 October 1855, however Instow was not opened until 2 November 1855. The station was located right on the water's edge of the Torridge Estuary, in the village of Instow. Engineering at the site included a substantial sea wall, and an 83-yard (76 m) tunnel just north of the station, which was built using a cut and cover method. The station had two platforms as a passing loop on a single track railway, and a small siding on the south-western side, which handled mainly coal inwards, and sugar beet and timber outwards.

The station fronted onto the place where the Taw and Torridge rivers combined into one estuary, and the quay just to the west of the station, allowed travellers to catch ferries to Appledore (on the other side of the estuary) and Lundy Island. Originally laid with a broad gauge, by 1863, a third rail was laid in each direction to provide for what was termed as narrow gauge trains. The company was amalgamated into the London and South Western Railway on 1 January 1865. The station was 6 miles 33 chains (10.3 km) south-west of Barnstaple, 2 miles 10 chains (3.4 km) north of Bideford, and 7 miles 53 chains (12.3 km) north of Torrington, where most passenger trains terminated. In January 1859, a steam train travelling south along the line derailed north of Instow station. The leading wheelset on the steam engine was defective, and caused the accident. Although the train had 30 passengers, no injuries were recorded. Most services on the line ran between Torrington and Barnstaple, or Exeter Central. In some years, longer trains extended to Eastleigh and Yeovil. The station regularly saw express traffic, such as the Atlantic Coast Express, a portion of which went to Torrington, but it did not stop at Instow.

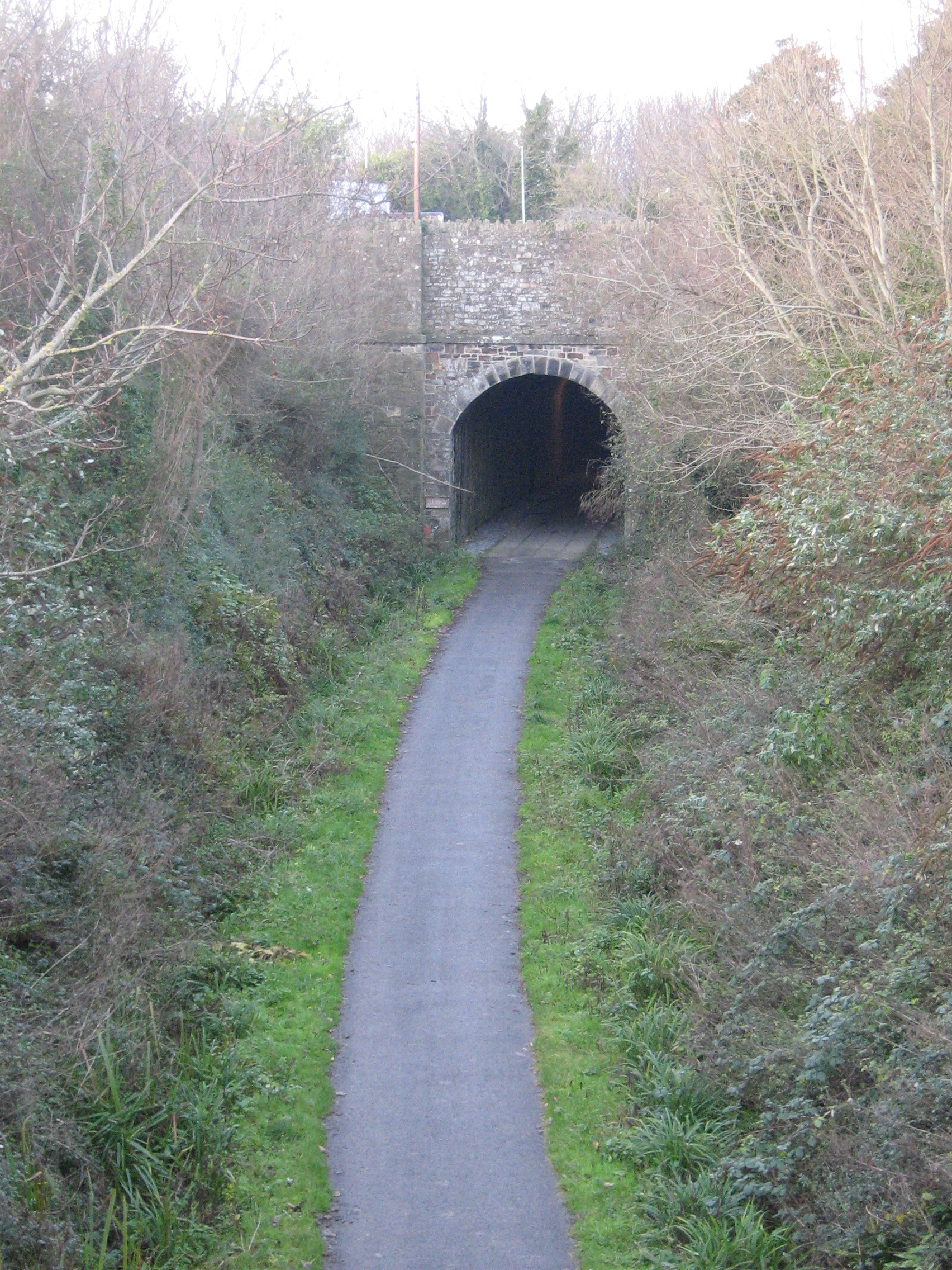
Tarka Trail Tunnel Instow

Passenger trains south of Torrington were stopped in March 1965, and the line through Instow was closed to all passengers on 4 October 1965, though the last trains had run on the Saturday before (2 October); the station had stopped being staffed from the previous January. After closure to passenger traffic, the line remained open for ball clay traffic from Meeth, which continued until 1982.

The signal box, which was built in 1861, has been preserved as a grade II listed building, the first to be so listed by the Department for the Environment. The signal box was closed in 1979, though after closure of the line to passengers, the loop through the station was removed and it only controlled the crossing gates and immediate signals. The crossing was replaced with automatic barriers in 1979. A railway strike in 1982, unexpectedly benefited the preservationists. They had wanted to carry out repairs to the box, but British Rail would have needed to charge £52 per day (equivalent to £185 in 2025) for a flagman to wave the two daily trains a day through the level crossing and past the signal box. The strike stopped traffic, and allowed the repairs to be carried out without incurring a penalty. The signal box was opened to the public in 1990, with just over 12,000 people visiting in the first eleven years. The trackbed through the station has been converted into the Tarka Trail. A proposal to reinstate the line between Bideford and Barnstaple, would see the return of trains through Instow. The Atlantic Coast–Exeter Railway Project aims to deliver an outline business case for the reinstatement by March 2023.

== Services ==
Due to the mixture of gauges in the 1860s, the timetable listed the services separately according to the gauge and whether or not it was passenger only, mixed traffic, or goods only. A service of eight trains were shown as calling at Instow in 1863, with only one (labelled as a narrow goods), not being able to take passengers. Between 1874 and 1887, services consisted of nine services towards Torrington between Monday and Saturday, with three on Sundays. Some of those originated at Exeter and split portions went on to Ilfracombe and Torrington. All trains were advertised as having first, second and third class carriages "without exception". The timetable for 1891 shows nine trains heading south through Instow, but only eight going north. Most were services between Exeter Central and Torrington. Sunday working consisted of two services only, both in the late afternoon/early evening.

In 1906, the timetable records all booked train movements, 19 in all, 16 of which carried passengers, some of which carried mail. One late morning train, which travelled northwards through the station, was shown as being an express passenger train to connect patrons to London Waterloo. By 1910, the through weekly services accounted for ten each way, however, Sunday services had been curtailed to one a day only. The 1922 timetable shows that services remained static at ten through the week, but no Sunday service. In 1924, (after the grouping, when services came under the Southern Railway), passenger services were eleven each way, four of which went to Waterloo, and one to Eastleigh. During the war years, trains remained at the static number of ten per day each way, with a combination of short local trains between Barnstaple and Torrington, and some longer distance services which started and terminated in Yeovil Town. Under British Rail, and the 1951 summer season, the station had twelve stopping trains, with other expresses passing through non-stop.

Preceding station	Disused railways	Following station
Fremington; Line and station closed	North British Railway; Bideford Extension Railway	Bideford; Line and station closed
