= Fremington railway station =

Disused railway station in Fremington, Devon

Fremington
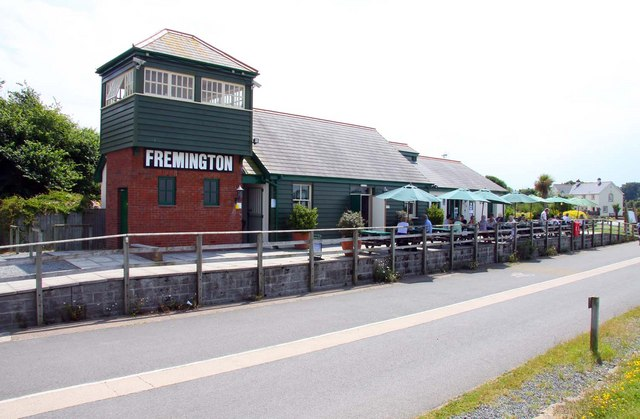
- The site of the station in 2009

General information
- Location: Fremington, Devon; England
- Coordinates: 51.0791°N 4.1205°W
- Grid reference: SS515332

Other information
- Status: Disused

History
- Original company: London and South Western Railway
- Pre-grouping: London and South Western Railway
- Post-grouping: Southern Railway

Key dates
- 2 November 1855: Opened
- 4 October 1965: Closed
Location

Fremington railway station served the village of Fremington, Devon, England, from 1855 to 1965 on the Bideford Extension Railway. Located at Fremington Quay, about 1 mile (1.6 km) from the centre of the village.

== History ==
The station was opened on 2 November 1855 by the London and South Western Railway. It closed on 4 October 1965.

Preceding station	Disused railways	Following station
Barnstaple; Line closed, station open	Bideford Extension Railway	Instow; Line and station closed
