= Kings Nympton railway station =

Railway station in Devon, England

Kings Nympton
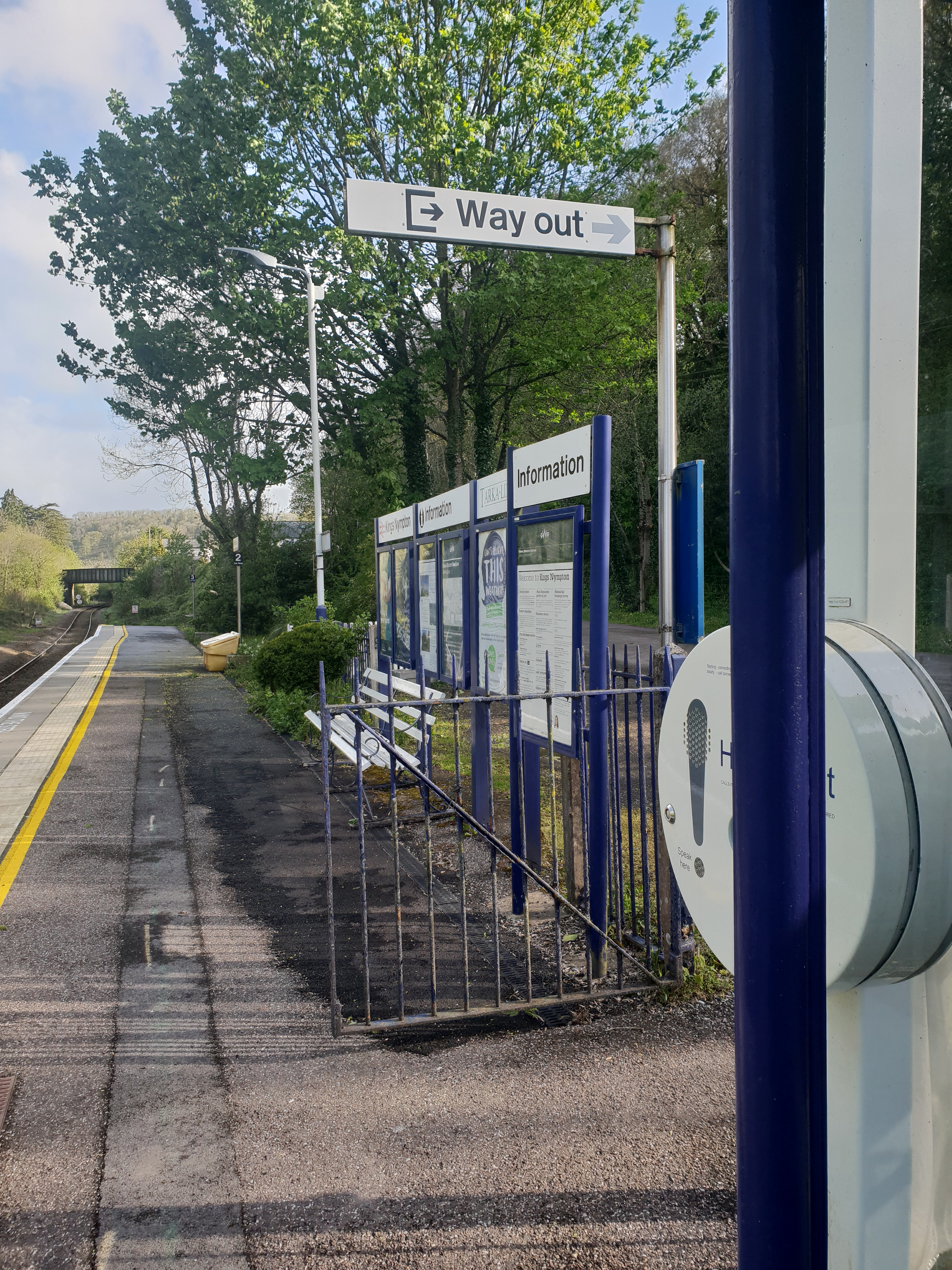

General information
- Location: Chulmleigh, North Devon; England
- Coordinates: 50.93600°N 3.90535°W
- Grid reference: SS662169
- Manager: Great Western Railway
- Platforms: 1

Other information
- Station code: KGN
- Classification: DfT category F2

History
- Original company: North Devon Railway
- Pre-grouping: London and South Western Railway
- Post-grouping: Southern Railway

Key dates
- Opened: 1854

Passengers
- 2021/22: ▲3,118
- 2022/23: ▲3,908
- 2023/24: ▲4,114
- 2024/25: ▲6,498
- 2025/26: ▼5,640
Location
Notes
- Passenger statistics from the Office of Rail and Road

Kings Nympton railway station, also spelt King's Nympton, is a request stop on the Tarka Line in North Devon, serving the civil parishes of Chulmleigh, Burrington and King's Nympton. The station is located at Fortescue Cross, a road junction on the A377, around 2 1/2 miles (4 km) from its namesake village. It is 26 miles 21 chains (42.3 km) from Exeter Central at milepost 197.75 from London Waterloo. The station and all trains are operated by Great Western Railway (GWR).

== History ==
=== Nineteenth century ===
The station was opened as South Molton Road on 11 August 1854, one of the five stations on the new North Devon Railway (NDR) line between Barnstaple and Crediton (from whence NDR trains continued on the Exeter and Crediton Railway to Exeter St Davids). The station's 'road' name showed that it was situated at a distance down the road from the town of South Molton, which is around 8 miles (13 km)) away.

The NDR initially had a service of four trains a day in each direction from Monday to Saturday and two trains a day on Sundays. From 2 November 1855 they were extended beyond Barnstaple to Bideford The London and South Western Railway (LSWR) took over the line and from 2 March 1863 could offer through services to their more central station in Exeter (Exeter Queen Street) and London Waterloo station. By 1906 they were operating 10 trains on weekdays but only one down and three up trains called on Sundays.

The LSWR opened a 16-lever signal box on 1 October 1873 to control the passing loop and the station's three sidings. The passing loop was short, only long enough for a 15-wagon goods train, but longer trains could reverse into sidings at either end of the station when necessary. The goods yard was on the north side of the line at the Exeter end of the station. It had a short siding serving cattle pens that were busy during the monthly a livestock auctions that were held adjacent to the station. The other siding was much longer and served a goods shed and coal merchant.

=== Twentieth century ===
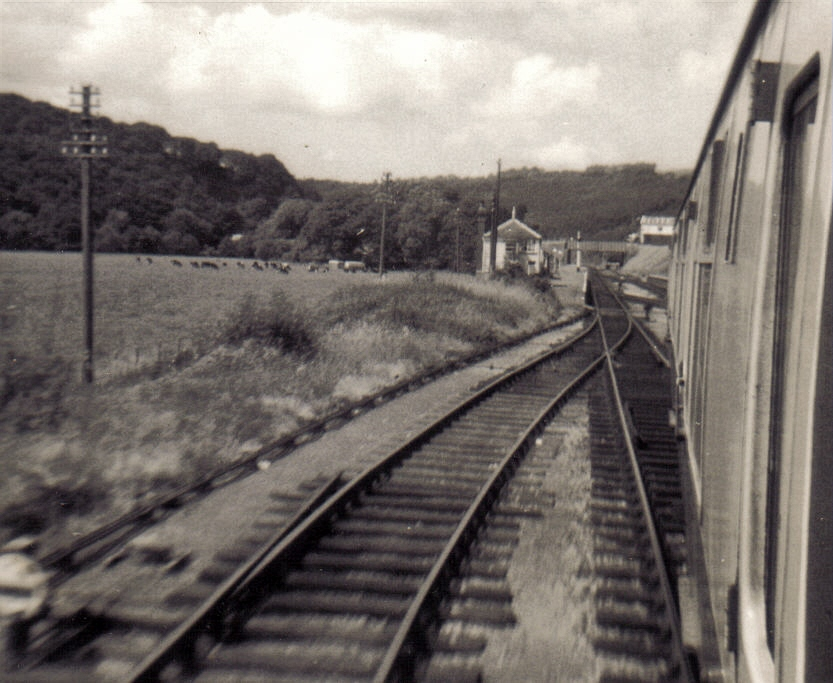
Kings Nympton in 1969, the year before the LSWR signal box was demolished, seen from a Mark I carriage at the rear of a northbound train.

The Railways Act 1921 merged the LSWR with other railways to create the new Southern Railway. In 1938 South Molton Road was served by eight trains a day in each direction.

The Southern Railway was nationalised in 1948 and South Molton Road became part of the Southern Region of British Railways. British Railways renamed the station from 'South Molton Road' to 'Kings Nympton' on 1 March 1951 to avoid confusion with South Molton railway station on the Barnstaple–Taunton line and to better reflect its location.

British Railways transferred the Southern Region lines west of Exeter to the Western Region in 1950, the Western Region being responsible for the stations while the Southern Region continued to operate the trains. BR transferred the lines back to the Southern Region in 1958. The BRB's 1963 The Reshaping of British Railways report included Kings Nympton on the list of stations proposed to be closed. In 1963 the line was transferred back to the Western Region along with all the Southern region lines west of Salisbury, both the stations and the trains.

In 1965 there were 9 down and 10 up trains calling at Kings Nympton on weekdays but the Western Region downgraded lines and cut services along the former Southern lines. The goods yard at Kings Nympton was closed to public traffic on 4 December 1967 although a siding was retained until 1981. The signal box closed on 26 July 1970 and since then all trains then have used the former up platform. By 1980 there were just 4 down trains each day and 5 weekday and 3 Sunday up services.

=== Tarka Line and privatisation ===
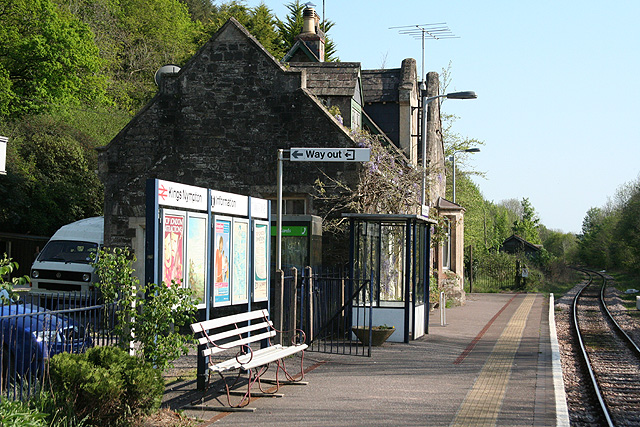
Kings Nympton in 2007.

British Rail introduced modern lightweight Class 142 'Skipper' trains in May 1986 but they did not prove successful so older, more conventional trains returned. In 1990 the line was promoted as the 'Tarka Line'.

British Rail was privatised in 1996. The infrastructure was transferred to Railtrack, which later became Network Rail, but the station was operated by whichever Train Operating Company held the franchise. Wales & West won the initial franchise that included the Barnstaple branch. Wales & West franchise was reorganised as Wessex Trains in 2001. The franchise was merged into First Great Western in 2006 which rebranded itself as the Great Western Railway in 2015.

In February 2012, the North Devon Public Transport Users' Group proposed that Kings Nympton—along with every other Tarka Line station except for Barnstaple, Crediton and Exeter St Davids—be closed, to improve journey times between Exeter and Barnstaple. The suggestion was opposed by the Tarka Rail Association, who said that the group 'cannot ignore the importance of those communities' served by Tarka Line halts like Kings Nympton, and Network Rail took no action on the basis of it.

In September 2013, the Tarka Rail Association published their Strategy for the Exeter–Barnstaple Line, laying out their aspirations for improvements to the Tarka Line. These included work to prevent flooding at Kings Nympton, and a recommendation that the track be moved back and the platform widened.

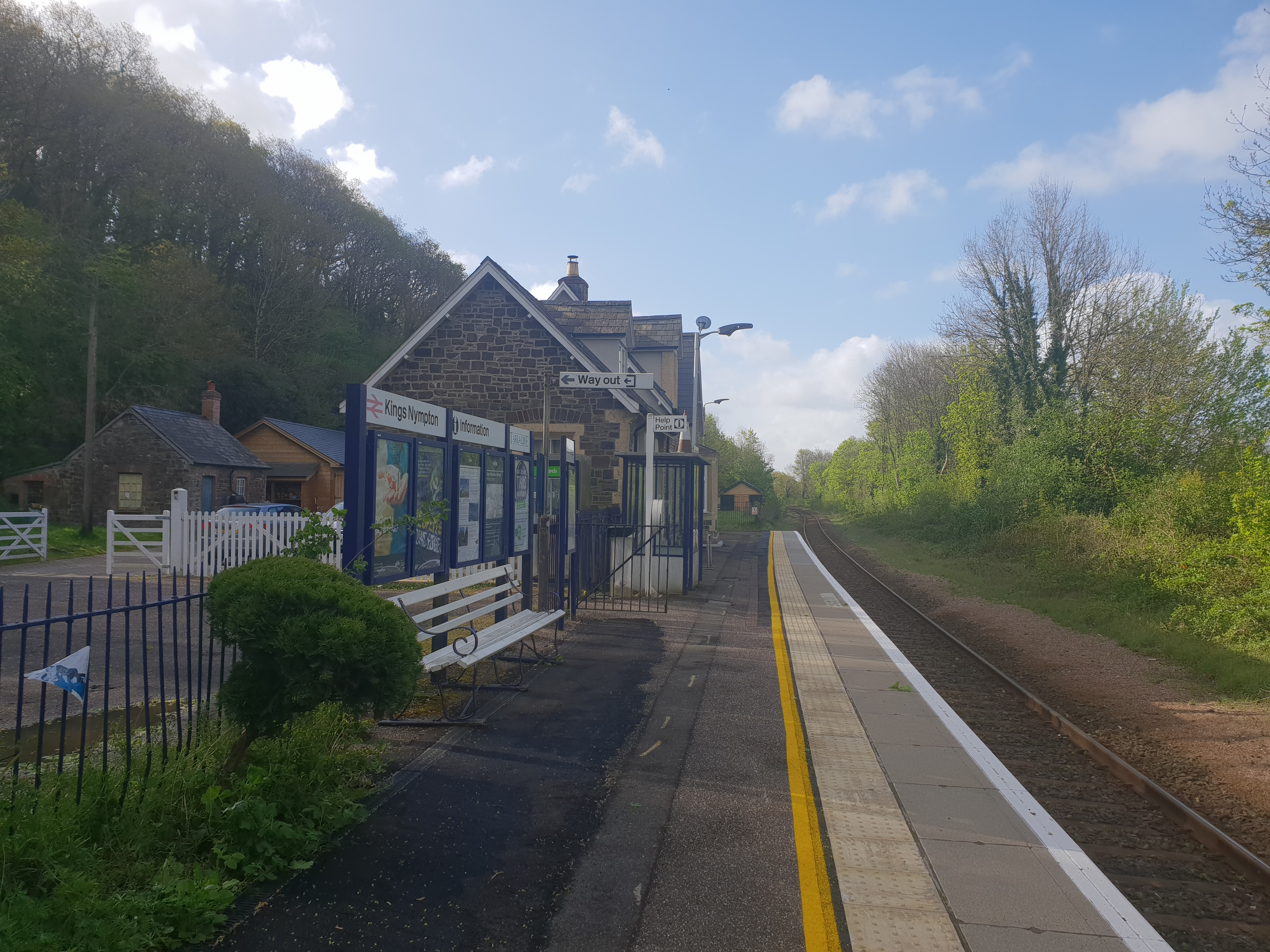
Kings Nympton in April 2019.

FGW rebranded as GWR in 2015. The temporary signage at the station—timetable posters, etc.—were updated to reflect the new branding, but as of 2020, the permanent signage continues to use the FGW logo BR-style design. GWR also painted new yellow lines on the platform and installed a customer help point.

The station was closed for two weeks between 26 October and 8 November 2019 whilst works were carried out elsewhere on the Tarka Line, in preparation for the extensive December 2019 timetable changes. These changes arrived on 31 December. The Class 143s and 153s were withdrawn and replaced with Class 158 Express Sprinters; at the request of the Tarka Rail Association, an additional northbound train from Kings Nympton was provided on Fridays; and direct services to Exmouth were withdrawn, with all southbound trains now terminating at St James Park.

It was closed again between 30 March and 4 April 2020 so that Network Rail could lay new ballast and improve track drainage in the general area of the station, implementing the suggestions made in the Tarka Rail Association's 2013 report.

=== Accidents and incidents ===
In October 2012, a car driver crashed into an embankment close to Kings Nympton, causing a train to have to stop. The driver was critically injured and was airlifted out by the Devon Air Ambulance; three other casualties were treated at the scene. Trains were initially suspended and were subsequently only allowed to pass Kings Nympton at 5 mph.

In September 2020, northbound trains were suspended through Kings Nympton, terminating one stop to the south at Eggesford, after a person was spotted "in the water"—presumably the River Taw, which runs close to the station.

== Description ==
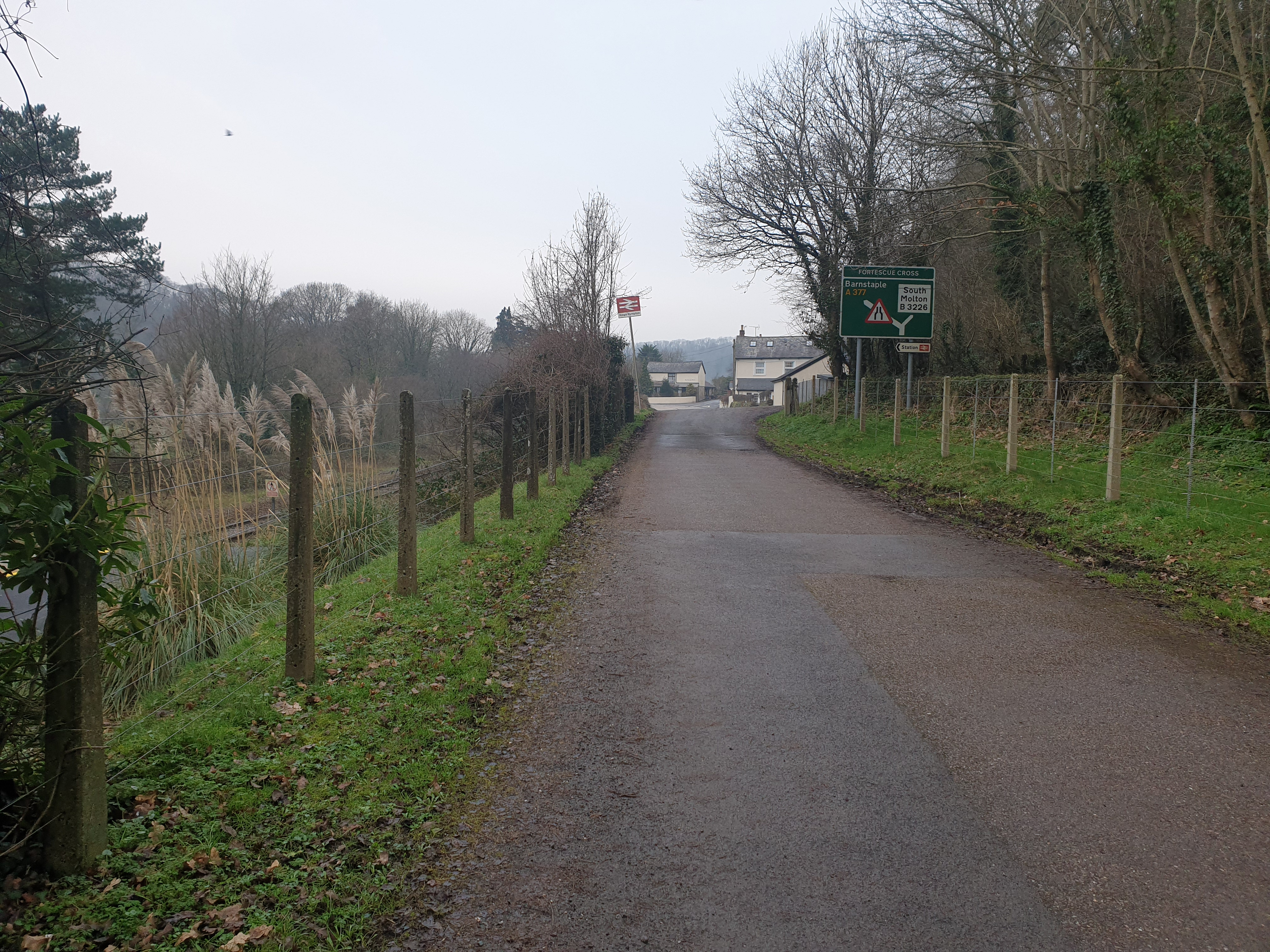
The access road, seen from the car park looking towards the merger into the A377.

Kings Nympton is located in the civil parish of Chulmleigh at Fortescue Cross, a small cluster of houses and the junction between the A377 and the B3226 roads. The station is more than a mile away from any named settlement; the closest hamlets being Head Bridge and Colleton Mills, around 1 mile (1.6 km) to the north and south respectively along the A377.

Kings Nympton has a single platform on the east side of the line. It is long enough for a four-coach train. with step-free access to the platform. There is car parking, bike rack and waiting shelter. At the south end of the platform is the former station master's house which is now a private home. The old northbound platform is derelict.

== Passenger volume ==
Kings Nympton is a fairly quiet station; in 2018–19, it was ranked 2,405th in the UK for entries and exits out of 2,566 stations, making it the 162nd least-used station. Of the thirteen Tarka Line stations, it is the fifth-least used, busier than Newton St Cyres, Lapford, Portsmouth Arms and Chapelton. Passenger numbers declined from around 7,000 entries and exits per annum in the late 1990s to a low of around 1,000 in 2006–07 and 2007–08, before rising again to a new high-water mark of around 8,000 in 2016–17 and subsequently entering a slower decline through the late 2010s, falling to around 5,000 entries and exits in 2018–19.

ORR estimates of station usage 1997–2019
	1997-98	1998-99	1999-2000	2000-01	2001-02	2002-03	2004-05	2005-06	2006-07	2007-08	2008-09	2009-10	2010-11	2011-12	2012-13	2013-14	2014-15	2015-16	2016-17	2017-18	2018-19
Entries												771	992	1,289	1,503	2,241	1,874	2,879	—	—	—
Exits												771	992	1,289	1,503	2,241	1,874	2,879	—	—	—
Total	6,875	7,131	4,669	4,476	4,220	4,013	2,400	1,781	1,009	1,033	1,542	1,984	2,578	3,006	4,482	3,748	3,422	5,758	8,030	6,640	5,000
The empty spaces show data that has been published by the ORR but has not yet been retrieved for this article.

The Department for Transport considers Kings Nympton a "small unstaffed" station as it has fewer than 100,000 journeys per annum, category F2.

== Services ==
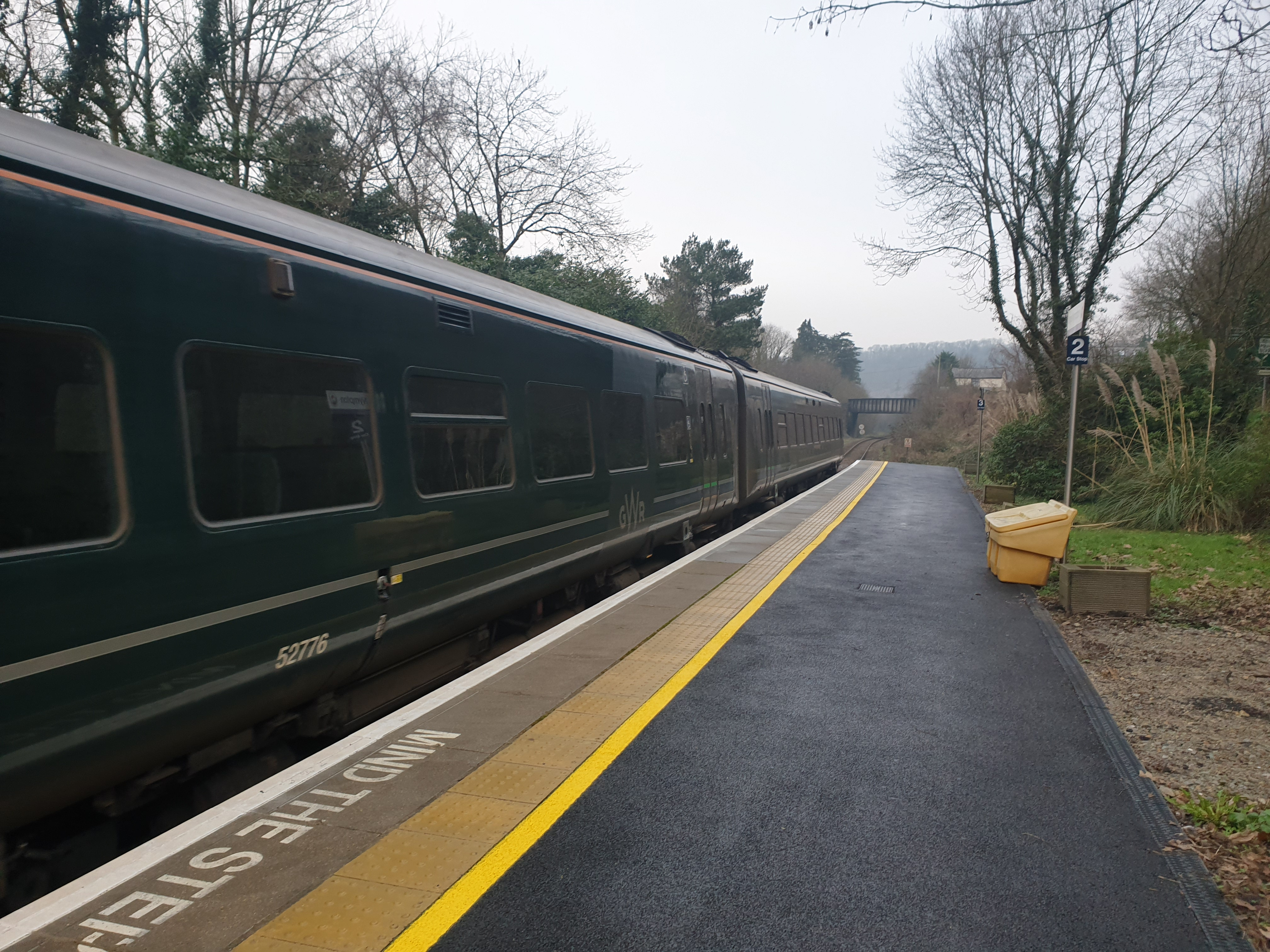
A Class 158 at Kings Nympton

All services at Kings Nympton are operated by Great Western Railway. Only a limited number of trains (four each way on Sundays but more on other days) between Barnstaple and Exeter Central call at Kings Nympton and this is only on request to the conductor or by signalling the driver as it approaches.

Preceding station	National Rail	Following station
Portsmouth Arms towards Barnstaple	Great Western Railway Tarka Line	Eggesford towards Exeter Central

The 'Railway Station' bus stop is at Fortescue Cross, around two minutes' walk from the platform. It is served by the 325 bus from Lapford to Barnstaple and the 663 bus from Chulmleigh to South Molton. One bus in each direction is provided each day.

== Variations on the name ==
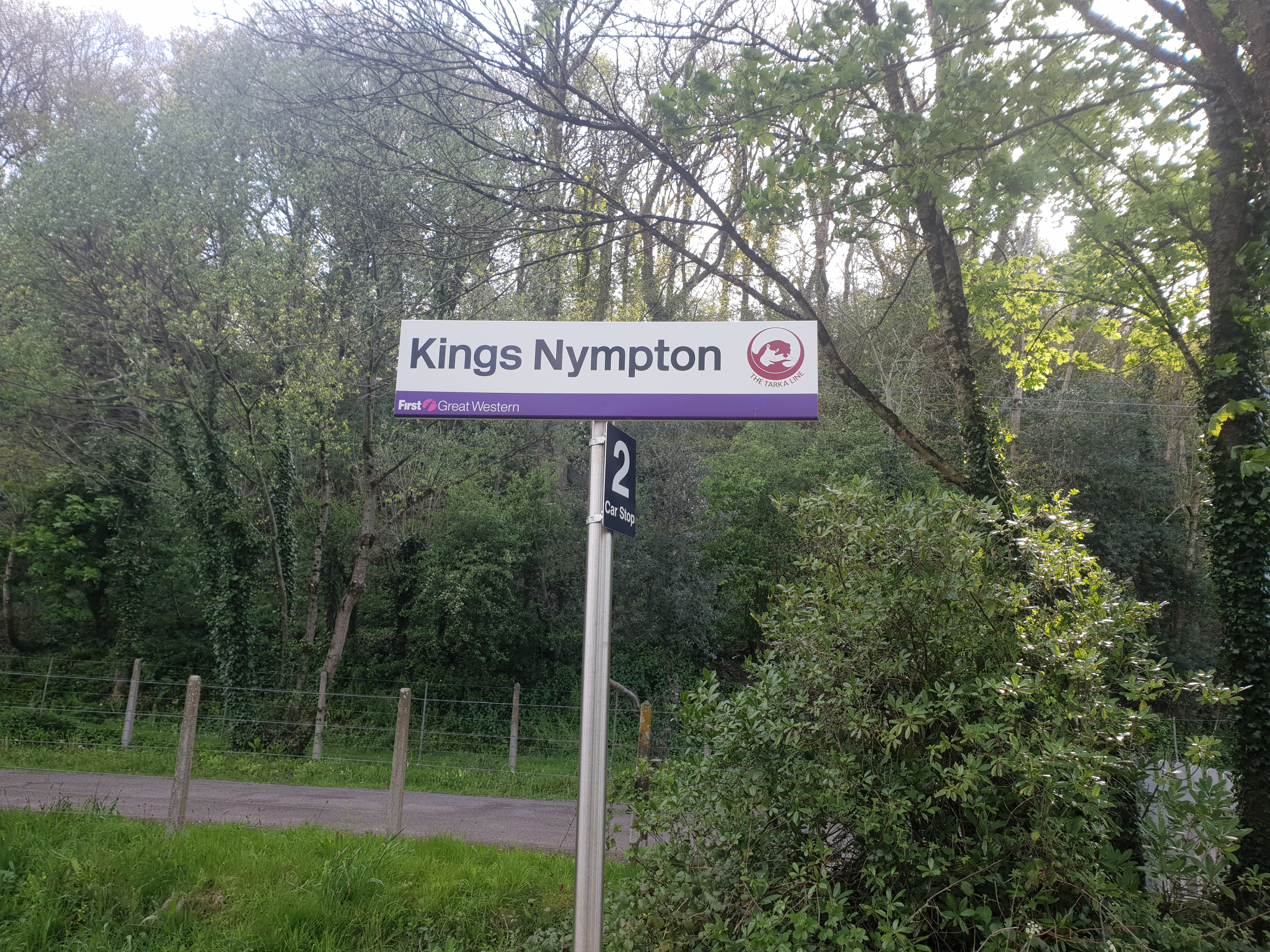
The current station signage uses the non-apostrophe spelling.

During the 1870s South Molton Road was sometimes referred to as 'Southmolton Road'.

While the current name is usually given as 'Kings Nympton' it is often given an apostrophe, 'King's Nympton', the same as the village from which it takes its name.

The Rail Delivery Group (RDG) spells the name without an apostrophe, and so this spelling is used in journey planners and station databases which use RDG data, including those of National Rail, the train operating companies (TOCs), and Trainline. The TOC that operates the station, GWR, uses the non-apostrophe variant, including on station signage and in timetables. Google Maps also omits the apostrophe. On the other hand, the 1963 British Railways Board report The Reshaping of British Railways—the Beeching report—uses the spelling King's Nympton in the list of stations to be closed. Ordnance Survey currently uses the apostrophe, as does The Guardian. BBC News use both spellings inconsistently, as do the Tarka Rail Association.

== Cultural references ==
In 1983, American author Paul Theroux described the station name Kings Nympton—along with those of Eggesford and Yeoford—as a "Bertie Wooster touch" that contributed to the Tarka Line's "comic feel". More broadly, he described the branch line as a whole as "motionless and silent", characterised by "long low hills and withered villages", and stated that the interest of railway enthusiasts therein was "worse than indecent and their joy-riding a mild form of necrophilia."

After complimenting other Tarka Line stations, Britain from the Rails: A Window Gazer's Guide says "whereas Kings Nympton is, frankly, in the middle of nowhere." It also refers to its name as "the ultimate cheek in station misnaming", and notes that "South Molton Road" was even more misleading, characterising it as "a hopeless attempt to trick people heading for that village, nine miles away on a rival line!"

== See also ==
- Rural transport problem
