= Two Moors Way =

Long-distance trail in Devon, England

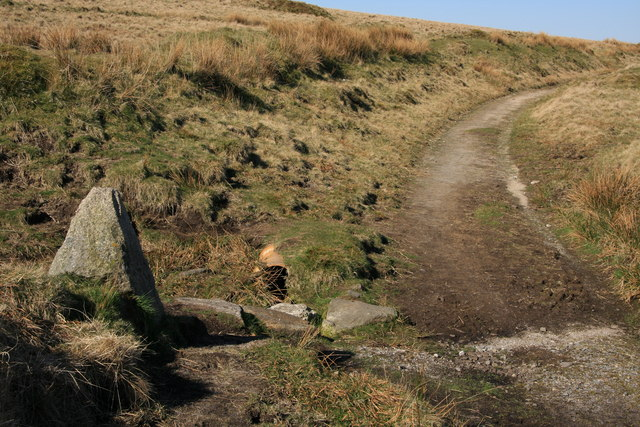
- The Two Moors Way at the point at which the path leaves, or joins, the Redlake Tramway track
- Length: 117 mi (188 km)
- Location: Devon & Somerset, England
- Trailheads: Wembury to Lynmouth
- Use: Hiking
- Sights: Dartmoor and Exmoor

The Two Moors Way is a long-distance trail mostly in Devon, UK, first established in 1976. It links Dartmoor and Exmoor and has been extended to become a Devon Coast-to-Coast trail.

== History ==
The Two Moors Way was the brainchild of Joe Turner of the Two Moors Way Association and was officially opened on 29 May 1976. The original Two Moors Way route spans 102 miles from Ivybridge on the southern boundary of Dartmoor National Park to Lynmouth on the North Devon Coast in Exmoor National Park. In 2005 the Two Moors Way was linked with the Erme–Plym Trail joining Wembury on the south Devon coast to Ivybridge to create a cross-county coast-to-coast route of just over 116 miles.

Joe Turner died suddenly in March 2002. In 2003 Devon County Council commissioned the Dartmoor sculptor Peter Randall-Page to create a testament to his work: two halves of an inscribed granite boulder now sit on the edge of Dartmoor and Exmoor, facing each other across 30 miles of rolling Mid Devon countryside.

In 2016, to mark the 40th anniversary of the original route, the Two Moors Way Association was reinvigorated to help promote the route, working in close partnership with the two National Parks and with Devon County Council who are responsible for maintaining and managing the path.

In 2017 a sculpture known as 'The Walker' was unveiled by TV presenter John Craven at the end point in Lynmouth, marking the intersection of several long distant walking routes across Exmoor National Park and beyond.

== Route ==
The route, which is waymarked in most places, passes through (from south to north): Wembury (optional) - Ivybridge - Holne - Hameldown - Chagford - Drewsteignton - Morchard Bishop - Witheridge - Knowstone - Hawkridge - Withypool - Simonsbath - Lynmouth. There are diversions and alternative routes for accessing accommodation, for avoiding the highest ground in bad weather, and because of concern over over-use: most of these were worked out originally in 1996 between the officers of the two national park authorities, Steve Church (Countryside & Access Officer for Devon County Council) and John Macadam (author of the Aurum Press / Ordnance Survey Recreational Path Guide The Two Moors Way, published in 1997). The route does not go over the northern part of Dartmoor as this is the Dartmoor Training Area though many walkers competent at navigating with map and compass make their own route here when there is no live firing (which is publicised 6 weeks in advance, and occurs on about 120 days a year) and rejoin the Two Moors Way in mid-Devon.

== Intersecting trails ==
The Two Moors Way intersects several other walking trails running through the moorlands:

- Coincides with the Tarka Trail for part of the way through Exmoor
- Coincudes with the Plym Erme Trail in S Devon
- Intersects with:
  - South West Coast Path
  - Macmillan Way West
  - Little Dart Ridge and Valley Walk
  - Taw-Teign Link
  - Dartmoor Way
  - Erme Valley Trail
  - Abbot's Way
