= Torrington railway station =

Former railway station in Devon, England

Coordinates: 50°57′26″N 4°9′56″W

Torrington
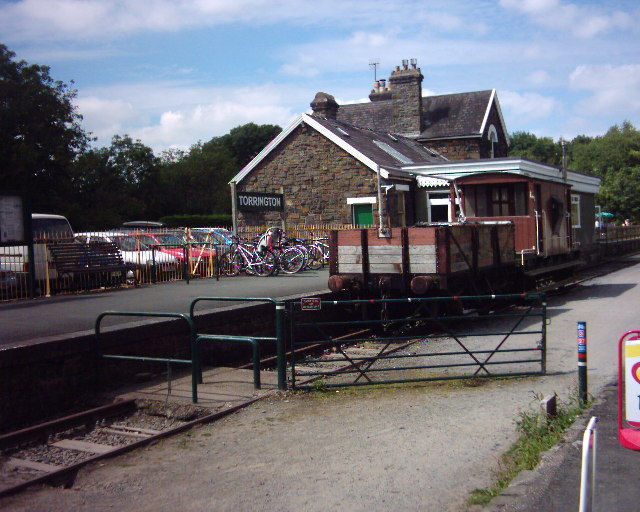
- The old station at Torrington in August 2005

General information
- Location: Great Torrington, Torridge; England
- Grid reference: SS479198
- Platforms: Two

Other information
- Status: Disused

History
- Original company: London and South Western Railway
- Pre-grouping: London and South Western Railway
- Post-grouping: Southern Railway

Key dates
- 18 July 1872: Opened
- 4 October 1965: Closed for regular passenger services
- 1982: Closed entirely
Location

Torrington railway station was a railway station located in Great Torrington, Devon. It was closed by British Railways in 1965 as part of the Beeching cuts.

== History ==
Built by the North Devon Railway, it opened on 18 July 1872, operated by the London and South Western Railway. The station dispatched trains to Bideford and Barnstaple, as well as to Exeter St Davids. From 1880 it connected with the narrow gauge freight only Torrington and Marland Railway. On grouping in 1923 the Torrington to Barnstaple line became part of the Southern Railway. In 1925 the narrow gauge Torrington and Marland Railway was rebuilt as a standard gauge line and opened through to Halwill Junction as the North Devon and Cornwall Junction Light Railway. A passenger service operated until 1965 when the line again reverted to carrying goods only until the line through Torrington was closed completely.

=== Milk trains ===
The SR and later the Southern Region of British Railways ran two regular milk trains up from Torrington every day, which served both the United Dairies creamery and bottling plant at Vauxhall, and the Express Dairies creamery at Morden. Filled by road tankers from the Torridge Vale Dairies, the first train of eight wagons left Torrington at 14:47, the second of six at 16:37, split due to the weight of the full milk tank wagons. The first train arrived at Clapham Junction in the evening, and reduced its length by half so that it did not block Vauxhall station while unloading. It would then proceed to Vauxhall, and pull into the "down" side platform, where a discharge pipe was provided to the creamery on the other side of the road. There was also pedestrian access from below the station, under the road to the depot, in the tunnel where the pipeline ran. Unloaded train would then proceed to Waterloo, where it would reverse and return to Clapham Junction to pick up the other half of the train. The procedure was then repeated, so that the entire first milk train was unloaded between the end of evening peak traffic and the start of the following morning. The second train from Torrington would also split at Clapham Junction, but only half of its Milk Tanks would be hauled to Vauxhall, while the other half were dispatched to the Express Dairies depot at Morden. In the late morning, both trains now empty Milk Tanks would be combined into one express train, and returned to Torrington. Milk trains from Torrington stopped in 1978, the last milk train on the former SR.

== Closure ==
The station was closed for regular passenger services in 1965 under the Beeching Axe. But due to both the China Clay and the milk train traffic, freight trains and the occasional passenger special used the line until 1982.

After full closure, the station building was converted to a public house, and then to a restaurant/ licensed café. The lines north and south now form part of the Tarka Trail cycle/walking network. The path south goes as far as Meeth and the path north goes all the way to Bideford, Barnstaple and Braunton

== Tarka Valley Railway ==
In July 2008, a railway preservation society called the Tarka Valley Railway was formed to create a heritage railway. The society has laid a short section of track adjacent to the platforms, displaying some rolling stock. In August 2023, the preservation society ran their first train along the 300-yard (270 m) section of track.

Longer-term objectives see the development of a tourist railway, extending as far as Bideford.

Preceding station	Disused railways	Following station
Terminus	Southern Railway; North Devon and Cornwall Junction Light Railway	Watergate Halt; Line and station closed
Bideford; Line to station only is open	London and South Western Railway	Terminus

== Gallery ==
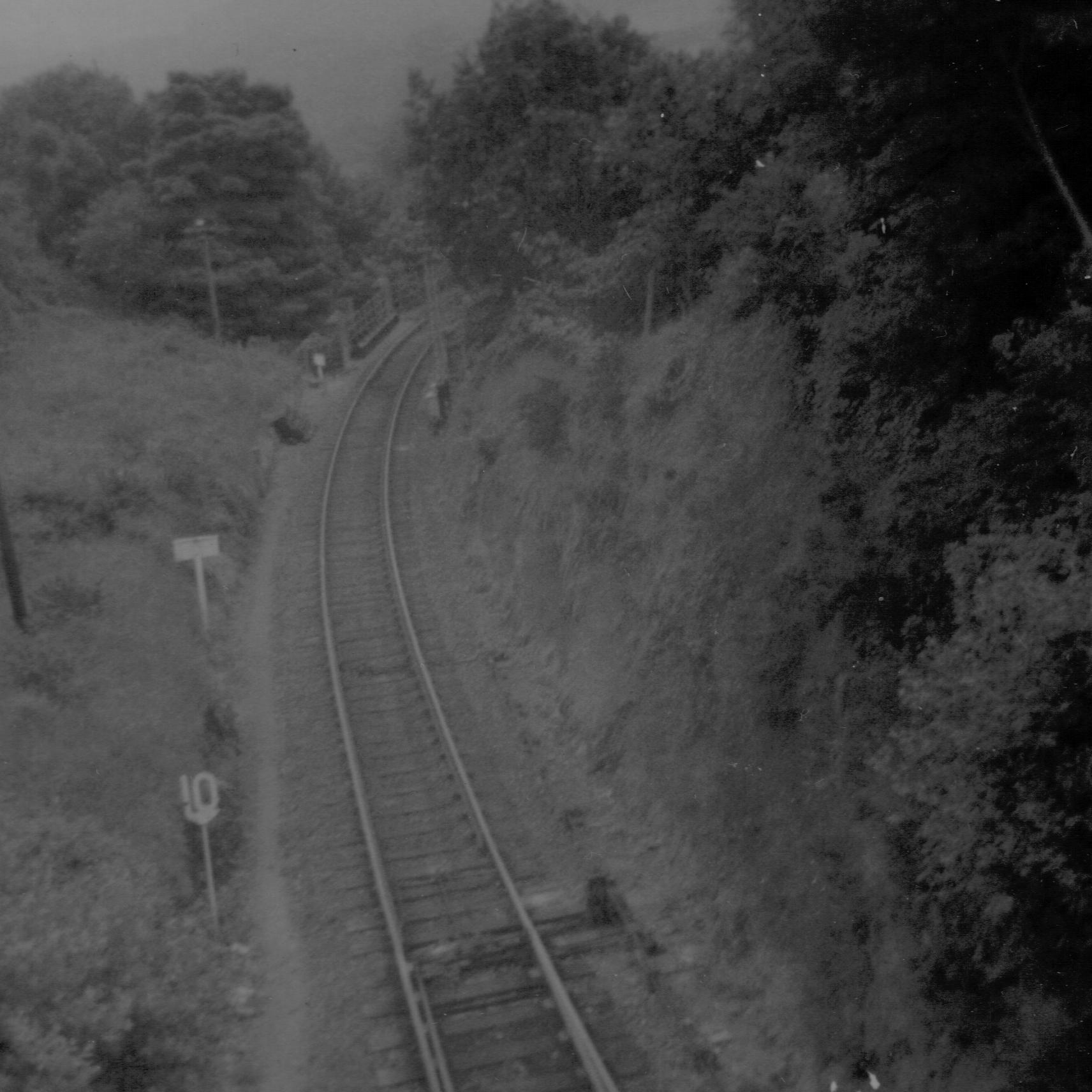
The approach to Torrington from Watergate Halt and the site of the old wooden viaduct in June 1969.

The narrow gauge wooden viaduct over the Torridge in 1905.

Torrington station on 15 June 1969 looking towards Bideford.

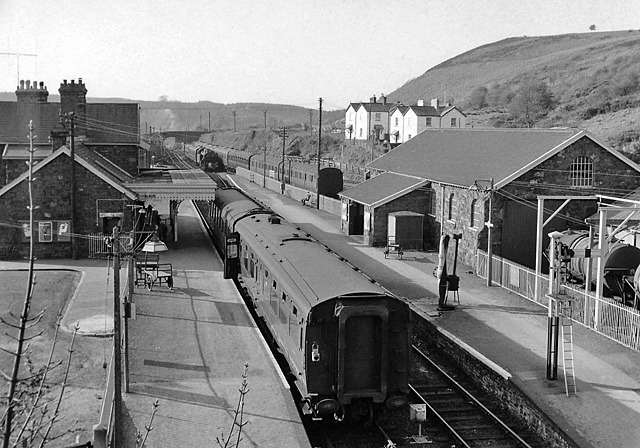
The station in April 1960

== See also ==
- List of closed railway stations in Britain
