= West Devon Way =

36-mile footpath in Devon, England

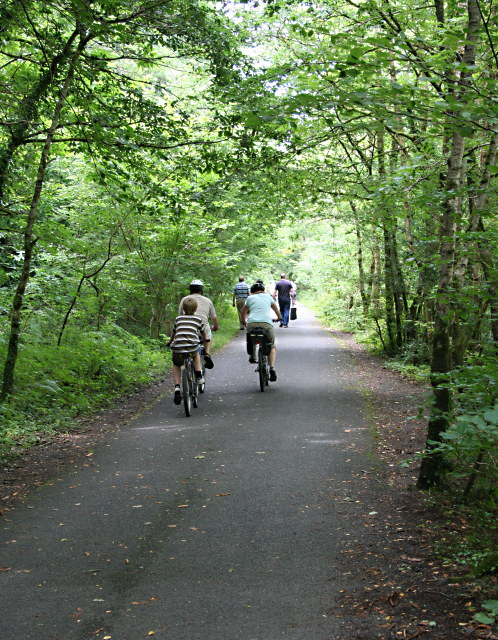
On the cycleway

The West Devon Way is a waymarked long-distance footpath in South West England in the United Kingdom. The West Devon Way runs for 58 km (36 mi).

== Route ==
The route runs from the western fringes of Dartmoor National Park moorland country then through Okehampton and Tavistock, Devon south towards Plymouth through gentler Devon countryside.

It links with the Tarka Trail into North Devon.

It also links with the Dartmoor Way and the Two Castles Trail.
