= Chawleigh =

Village in Devon, England

Coordinates: 50.9°N 3.833333°W

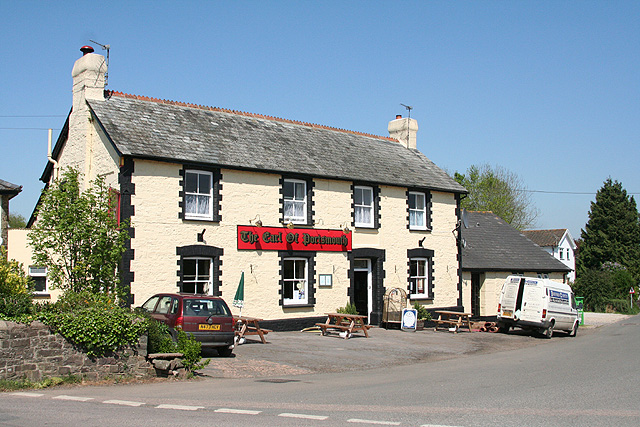
- The Earl of Portsmouth

- Location within Devon
- Population: 639 (2021)
- OS grid reference: SS7112
- Civil parish: Chawleigh
- District: Mid Devon
- Shire county: Devon
- Region: South West
- Country: England
- Sovereign state: United Kingdom
- Post town: CHULMLEIGH
- Postcode district: EX18
- Dialling code: 01769
- Police: Devon and Cornwall
- Fire: Devon and Somerset
- Ambulance: South Western
- UK Parliament: North Devon

Chawleigh is a village and civil parish in the Mid Devon district of Devon, England, situated just off the A377 between Crediton and Barnstaple. At the 2021 census, it had a population of 639, which was slightly less than the 642 recorded at the 2011 census.

CHAWLEIGH, a parish and village on the south side of the Little Dart valley, 2 miles (3.2 km) S.E. of Chulmleigh, contains 850 inhabitants, and 5,478 acres (22.17 km^{2}) of land; and has two cattle fairs, on May 6 and the Tuesday before the last Thursday in October. L.W. Buck, Hy. Reed, Cpr. Northcote, and the Rev. J. Russell have estates here, but about three-fourths of the parish belong to the Hon. Newton Fellowes, who is also lord of the manor, and patron of the rectory, valued in K.B. at £25. 14s. 2d., and in 1831 at £501, and now in the incumbency of the Rev. P.F. Clay, M.A., who has an ancient residence and 95 acres (380,000 m^{2}) of glebe. The tithes were commuted in 1849 for £470. 5s. 10d. per annum. The Church (St. James,) has an embattled tower, six bells and a handsomely carved screen. The parish has 24A. of land, ten houses, and several gardens let for about £90, which is mostly applied in the service of the church. The Free School and master's house are vested with the trustees of the parish lands; and here is another school supported by the rector. The poor parishioners have about £6 yearly from various bequests."

— From White's Devonshire Directory (1850)
