= Dartmoor Way =

Long-distance walking and cycling route in Devon, England

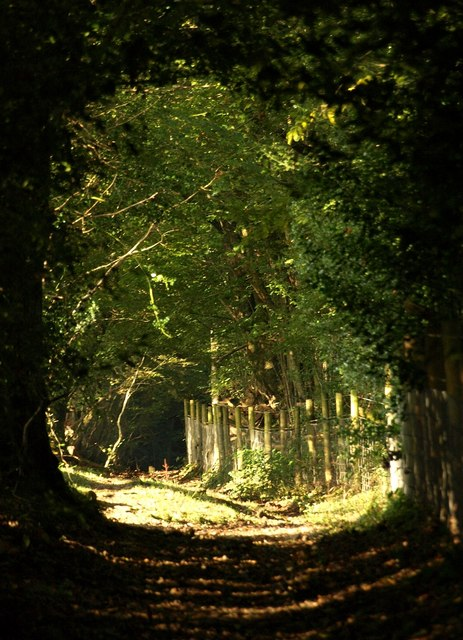
- Dartmoor Way below Rora Down
- Length: 95 miles (153 km).
- Location: Devon, England
- Trailheads: 50°34′12″N 3°55′01″W
- Use: Cycling, hiking
- Elevation change: 10,600 ft (3,200 m)
- Highest point: 1,400 ft (430 m)

The Dartmoor Way is a long-distance footpath and cycle route centred on the Dartmoor National Park in southern Devon, England. The loop route of approximately 84 miles (135 km) that encompasses upland and moorland walking, deep Devon lanes, and also passes through towns and villages such as Okehampton, Chagford, Moretonhampstead, Buckfastleigh, Princetown and Tavistock.

The Dartmoor Way links with the Tarka Trail, West Devon Way and Two Castles Trail.
