= Little Dart River =

Tributary of the River Taw in Devon, England

Coordinates: 50°56′N 3°54′W

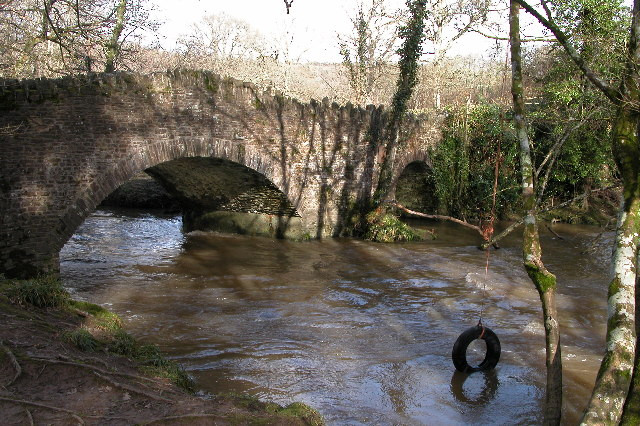
Little Dart River at Leigh Bridge

The Little Dart River is a tributary of the River Taw in Devon, England. It joins the Taw a mile west of Chulmleigh.

The Little Dart rises near Rackenford. It flows west past Witheridge and through a deep wooded valley between Chawleigh and Chulmleigh before meeting the Taw.

Devon County Council has promoted an 11-mile walking route, the Little Dart Ridge and Valley Walk, which links the Two Moors Way at Witheridge to the Tarka Trail at Eggesford railway station.

A survey completed in 2007 examined the water quality of the river Taw and its tributaries. The result in the Little Dart was a marginal failure, put down to the dairy farming and fertilizers being spread in the area.
