= Portsmouth Arms railway station =

Railway station in Devon, England

Portsmouth Arms
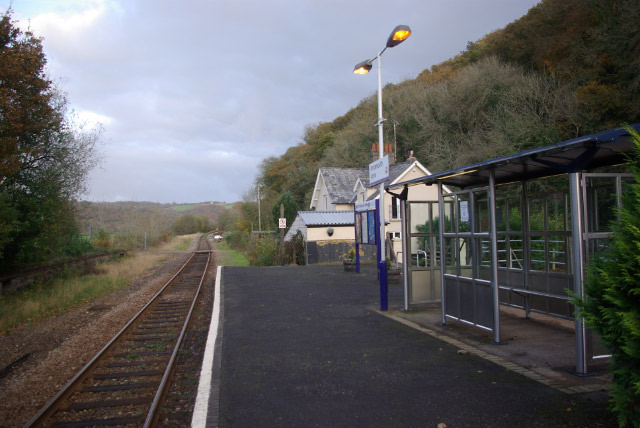

General information
- Location: Burrington, North Devon; England
- Coordinates: 50.95697°N 3.95086°W
- Grid reference: SS630193
- Manager: Great Western Railway
- Platforms: 1

Other information
- Station code: PMA
- Classification: DfT category F2

History
- Original company: North Devon Railway
- Pre-grouping: London and South Western Railway
- Post-grouping: Southern Railway

Key dates
- Opened: 1855

Passengers
- 2021/22: ▲768
- 2022/23: ▲798
- 2023/24: ▲802
- 2024/25: ▼596
- 2025/26: ▲766
Location
Notes
- Passenger statistics from the Office of Rail and Road

Portsmouth Arms railway station is a small wayside station in Devon. It is in the parish of Burrington but remote from any village so is named after the nearby 'Portsmouth Arms' pub. It is on the Tarka Line to Barnstaple, 29 miles 8 chains (46.8 km) from Exeter Central at milepost 200.5 from London Waterloo.

== History ==
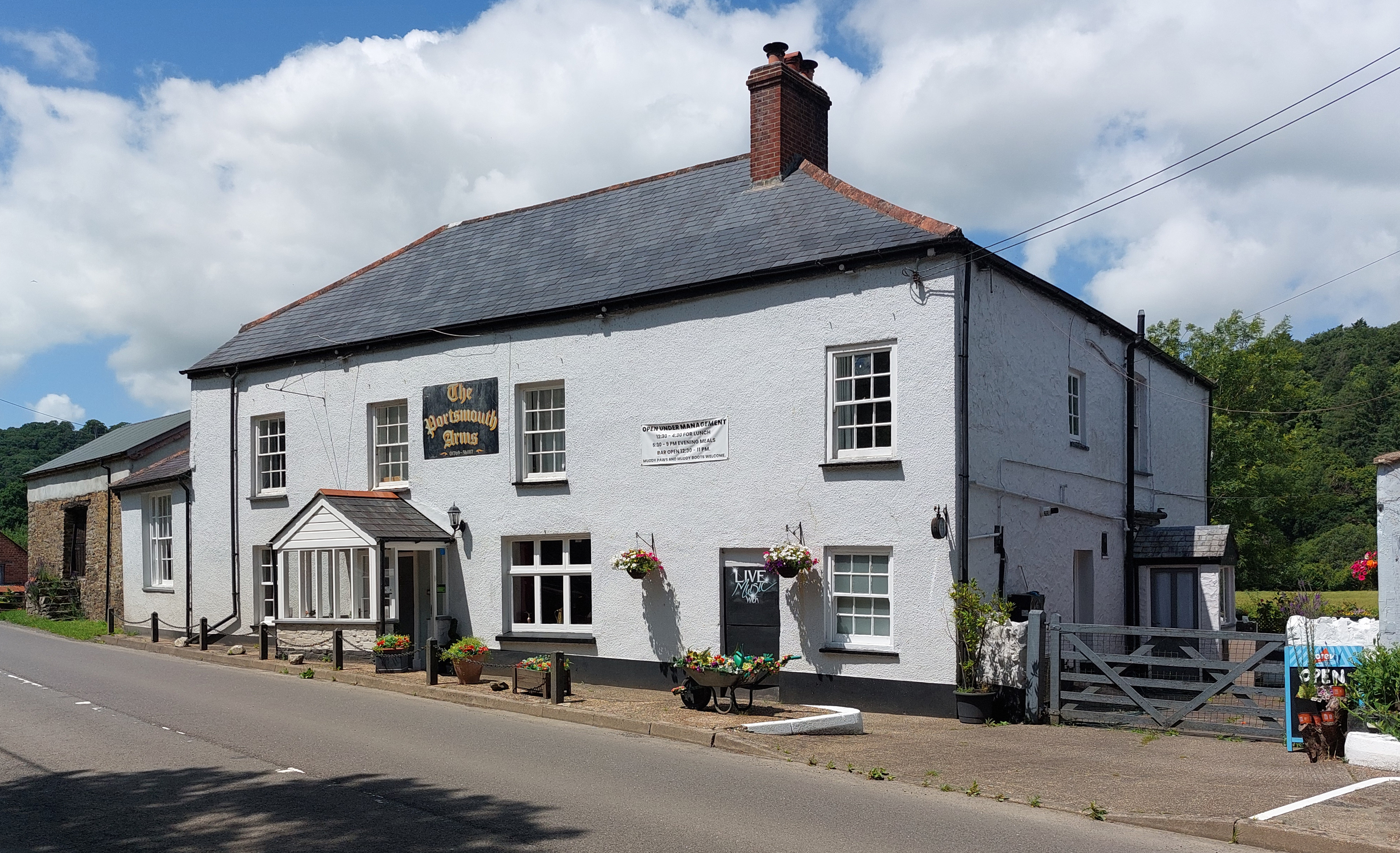
The Portsmouth Arms pub from which the station takes its name

The 4th Earl of Portsmouth built the turnpike between Exeter and Barnstaple and was later a supporter of proposals for a railway along the same route. A pub was built in the Taw valley and named in his honour. It was at this spot that the North Devon Railway opened a station in September 1855, more than a year after it started running trains through the site. It had a small passing loop and a single long siding at the south end for goods traffic. The passenger facilities were in a building on the northbound platform while the southbound platform had a waiting shelter and a goods store. A house for the station master was added later and a signal box was opened on 1 October 1873.

The goods yard was closed on 3 July 1961 and the siding removed in 1963. The signal box remained in use until 3 April 1966. In 2006 Formosa, a Pullman car built in 1921, was placed behind the platform to be restored but was moved elsewhere in 2024.

== Description ==
The station has a single platform on the west side of the line, adjacent to the A377 road. The old station house is now in private use but there is a waiting shelter on the platform. There is a bike rack but no car parking.

== Services ==
All services at Portsmouth Arms are operated by Great Western Railway. Only a limited number of trains (four or five each way Sundays and fewer on other days) between Barnstaple and Exeter Central call at Portsmouth Arms and this is only on request to the conductor or by signalling the driver as it approaches.

Preceding station	National Rail	Following station
Umberleigh towards Barnstaple	Great Western Railway Tarka Line	Kings Nympton towards Exeter Central

== Community railway ==
The railway between Exeter and Barnstaple is designated as a community railway and is supported by marketing provided by the Devon and Cornwall Rail Partnership. The line is promoted as the Tarka Line.
