= North Devon Railway =

Former English railway company

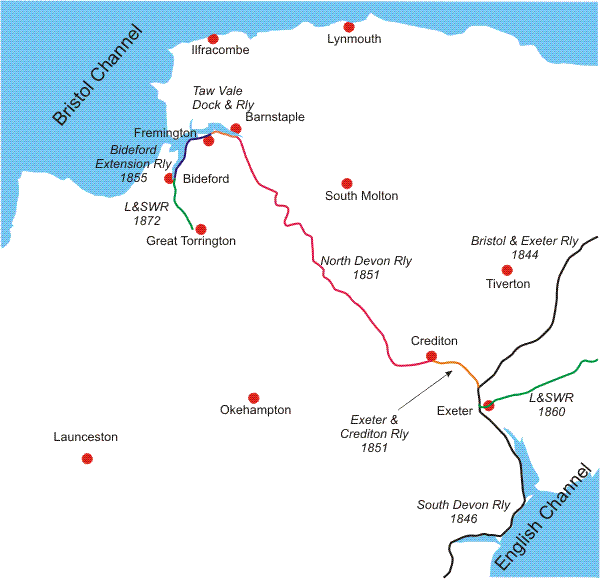
- Map of the North Devon group of railways, with opening dates

Technical
- Track gauge: 4 ft 8 1/2 in (1,435 mm) standard gauge
- Previous gauge: 7 ft 1/4 in (2,140 mm) until 1892

The North Devon Railway was a railway company which operated a line from Cowley Bridge Junction, near Exeter, to Bideford in Devon, England, later becoming part of the London and South Western Railway's system. Originally planned as a broad gauge (7 ft 0¼ in, 2,140 mm) feeder to the Bristol & Exeter Railway, it became part of a battle between the broad gauge group and the standard gauge railway interests. In this context, standard gauge lines were often described as narrow gauge.

The original construction in the middle of the nineteenth century was significant in giving rail connection to the important, but remote towns of North Devon that had hitherto relied on the packhorse and coastal shipping. The Exeter to Barnstaple section followed the rivers Yeo and Taw, passing through pleasing countryside, and meandered with the valleys, but passing only very small settlements. It remains open between Exeter and Barnstaple, and passenger trains on the route are branded the Tarka Line for marketing purposes.

The northern extremities turned south to Bideford and Torrington following the coast of the Bristol Channel before turning inland. Part of this section is now a cycleway known as the Tarka Trail.

== Plans and debates ==
=== Parliamentary battles ===
In the 1830s, it began to be apparent that railways could substantially improve the prospects of connected towns. Most existing transport was by coastal shipping, by rivers and canals, or by pack horse.

In 1831 promoters in Crediton decided that rail connection to a dock on the tidal River Exe at Exeter was needed, and powers were obtained by act of Parliament, the Exeter and Crediton Railway Act 1832 (2 & 3 Will. 4. c. xciii), of 23 June 1832. However no construction actually took place and the powers lapsed.

Taw Vale Railway and Dock Act 1838
- Act of Parliament
- Parliament of the United Kingdom
- Long title: An Act for making a Railway from Penhill in the Parish of Fremington in the County of Devon to the Town of Barnstaple, and for constructing a Dock in the said Parish of Fremington, to be called "The Taw Vale Railway and Dock."
- Citation: 1 & 2 Vict. c. xxvii

Dates
- Royal assent: 11 June 1838

Text of statute as originally enacted

Taw Vale Railway and Dock Act 1845
- Act of Parliament
- Parliament of the United Kingdom
- Long title: An Act to amend the Act relating to the Taw Vale Railway and Dock.
- Citation: 8 & 9 Vict. c. cvii

Dates
- Royal assent: 21 July 1845

A public meeting at Barnstaple came to a corresponding conclusion for their town, and proposed a railway to Fremington, and to construct a dock there, avoiding the difficult passage of the River Taw to their town. They obtained the Taw Vale Railway and Dock Act 1838 (1 & 2 Vict. c. xxvii) on 11 June 1838, but this scheme too resulted in no actual construction. However, there was enough interest to get the Taw Vale Railway and Dock Act 1845 (8 & 9 Vict. c. cvii) on 21 July 1845 extending the powers and authorising certain additional works.

The Bristol and Exeter Railway (B&ER) reached Exeter, opening on 1 May 1844, putting the city directly in rail communication with London.

At this time it was realised everywhere that railways were needed to connect with the beginnings of a national network. High dividend distributions among the earlier companies provoked a vast number of railway schemes, at a time when it was believed that any district could only support a single railway, and the frenzy this created is known as the railway mania. At the same time, the Great Western Railway (GWR) and its ally the B&ER were built using the broad gauge, while nearly all large competing companies used the standard gauge (often referred to as the narrow gauge in contrast). If a new independent local scheme was being promoted, securing its chosen gauge to be broad or narrow also secured its allegiance to one or the other of the larger companies, and in turn this might secure further territorial exclusivity for the winner. This continuing process became known as the gauge wars.

In 1845 the railway mania resulted in a huge number of competing schemes being proposed in Parliament, which arranged for a Railway Commission led by Lord Dalhousie to review competing proposals and recommend a selected scheme for each area. The commission was informally referred to at the time as the Five Kings. In addition, because of difficulties in operating a national network with railways using different gauges, a Gauge Commission was set up to propose policy on the gauge question.

Schemes put forward for the consideration of Dalhousie's included a new Exeter and Crediton Railway (E&CR) (to join Crediton to the B&ER at Exeter) and a North Devon Railway to run from Crediton to Barnstaple. The commission rejected all other proposals for the area, and in a report dated 4 March 1845 they recommended postponement of a decision on these two in order to appraise an alternative route suggestion, to run from Tiverton to Barnstaple instead of Exeter to Barnstaple. The Taw Vale Dock and Railway from Barnstaple to Fremington was of course already authorised.

Crediton had observed the arrival of the B&ER at Exeter and developed a scheme to run from their town to join the B&ER at Cowley Bridge. Surprisingly in view of Dalhousie's recommendation, they got their act of Parliament, the Exeter and Crediton Railway Act 1845 (8 & 9 Vict. c. lxxxviii), on 21 July 1845, with authorised capital of £70,000. The track gauge was not specified. The new company intended to lease their line to the B&ER.

=== The plans take shape ===
With the Taw Vale line (from Barnstaple to Fremington) and the Exeter and Crediton line authorised, thoughts turned more urgently to connecting Barnstaple to the emerging national network; two projected lines sought to do this in the 1846 session of Parliament, and they polarised in their obvious allegiance to other lines.

A North Devon Railway Company was promoted to build a broad gauge line from Tiverton, where the B&ER was building a branch line, via Bampton and Dulverton to Barnstaple and Bideford. Several directors of the B&ER and Great Western Railway were on the provisional committee, together with the Lord Lieutenant of Devonshire and other worthies; and the scheme became inflated with lines to Taunton and Plymouth, and the estimated cost rose to £1.75 million. Isambard Kingdom Brunel was the engineer. However the deposited plans were submitted to Parliament late, and the bill was rejected as not complying with standing orders; no more was heard of this North Devon Railway and £38,668 (equivalent to £3.9 million in 2025) had been expended on surveys and designs fruitlessly.

Taw Vale Railway and Dock Act 1846
- Act of Parliament
- Parliament of the United Kingdom
- Long title: An Act for amending the Acts relating to the Taw Vale Railway and Dock, and for making an Extension therefrom to the Exeter and Crediton Railway in the County of Devon.
- Citation: 9 & 10 Vict. c. ccclv

Dates
- Royal assent: 7 August 1846

Text of statute as originally enacted

The second was the Taw Vale Railway Extension and Dock Company. The capital was to be £700,000 (equivalent to £71 million in 2025), to build from Barnstaple to Crediton; in effect the route of the 1845 North Devon Railway that had been postponed by decision of Dalhousie's committee. The difference from the previous scheme was that the London and South Western Railway (LSWR) was heavily supporting the proposed line, seeing the chance to capture a large area of territory. The engineer was Joseph Locke, the engineer of the LSWR. This was evidently a long-term aim, for at this time the LSWR was still building its Salisbury branch, 90 miles away. The TVER was to take over the Taw Vale Railway works, and to have new capital of £533,000 (equivalent to £54 million in 2025), and it got its authorising act of Parliament, the Taw Vale Railway and Dock Act 1846 (9 & 10 Vict. c. ccclv), on 7 August 1846. The new company was usually referred to as the Taw Vale Extension Railway (TVER), or simply the Taw Vale Railway.

Taw Vale Railway and Dock Act 1847
- Act of Parliament
- Parliament of the United Kingdom
- Long title: An Act for making a Deviation in the Line of the Taw Vale Railway, for making Branches therefrom to the Towns of Bideford and South Moulton, for enlarging the Dock, and for amending the Acts relating thereto.
- Citation: 10 & 11 Vict. c. cclxxiii

Dates
- Royal assent: 22 July 1847

Text of statute as originally enacted

The following session saw the TVER get the Taw Vale Railway and Dock Act 1847 (10 & 11 Vict. c. cclxxiii) on 22 July 1847 which authorised branches to Bideford and South Molton.

=== The B&ER loses influence ===
When the broad gauge interest lost their proposed North Devon Railway, they lost no time in negotiating with the TVER promoters, and provisionally agreed a lease of the line to the B&ER; there was already a corresponding provisional agreement for the B&ER to lease the Exeter and Crediton line.

These provisional leases had to be ratified by shareholders, and the allegiance to the B&ER and the broad gauge, or to the LSWR and the narrow gauge, was a contentious issue. It was known that many E&CR shares had been bought up by persons favourable to the LSWR and at the E&CR shareholders' meeting on 11 January 1847 the provisional lease was rejected. A week later the provisional TVER lease had to be put to its shareholders' meeting for ratification, and it was rejected unanimously. A more favourable lease to the LSWR was negotiated and ratified by shareholders on 18 January 1847.

The Exeter and Crediton line needed to lease its line, and the shareholders now ratified a lease to the TVER on 24 February 1847. This was to be guaranteed by the LSWR and was in effect a lease to them.

J. W. Buller was chairman of the E&CR board and he and other directors aligned to the B&ER were in the majority; but it was very plain that the huge majority of shareholders favoured the LSWR. To frustrate further alignment to the narrow gauge, Buller signed a two-year contract with a George Hennett to work the line on 7 April 1847. The minority Taw Vale directors called an extraordinary general meeting on 12 April 1847, and proposed removal of Buller and three other B&ER directors, and proposed prohibiting the opening of the line on the broad gauge. Buller as chairman declared the proposition to be illegal but it was carried. Amid angry scenes and a scuffle, Buller and his friends departed the meeting, taking the minute book with them. At subsequent legal hearings, the takeover by the Taw Vale directors was declared to be legal, and a director called Thorne was properly the chairman of the company. Complaints were made to the Railway Commissioners, and they found that the LSWR had improperly funded share purchases by local individuals to gain a majority at the votes, but the B&ER had done a similar thing over the E&CR vote.

== Construction starts ==
=== Taw Vale and Exeter & Crediton construction ===
While all this had been going on, some actual construction had also been worked on. The Taw Vale had started construction on 5 January 1846, and the Exeter and Crediton had started work at the end of 1845. In fact at the shareholders' meeting of 24 February 1847 referred to above, Buller had reported that the line was complete and ready, excepting the connection to the B&ER at Cowley Bridge, near Exeter, which could not be made until some formal agreement with the B&ER had been made.

By March 1847 the original Taw Vale line from Barnstaple to Fremington was substantially complete, and the first sod of the extension was dug, and contracts for it let. However the financial collapse following the railway mania led to scarcity of money, and in November work on the extension had to be suspended.

=== The gauge question comes to a head ===
The Taw Vale Railway and Dock Act 1846 (9 & 10 Vict. c. ccclv) had left the crucial question of the gauge of the new line to be determined by the Board of Trade. The TVER now on 27 August 1847 asked for approval for laying standard gauge track.

Following the rejection of the E&CR lease to the B&ER, the directors of the E&CR now saw themselves as aligned to the LSWR. The railway had been fully completed, except for the connection to the B&ER at Cowley Bridge. Believing that this connection was now impossible, on 3 December 1847 the board ordered the broad gauge track to be converted to narrow gauge. Reaching Exeter over the B&ER would be impossible, so they started work on a station at Cowley Bridge near the turnpike road: Cowley Bridge was to be their railhead for Exeter. This arrangement would be hugely inconvenient, for traffic from Barnstaple and North Devon, as well as Crediton.

The Railway Commissioners of the Board of Trade now on 8 February 1848 gave their decision on the gauge of the TVER: it was to be on the broad gauge, because of the dominance of the broad gauge on the main lines in the area: the B&ER and the South Devon Railway, open from Exeter to Totnes, and building on to Plymouth. The decision only applied to the TVER: the section from Crediton to Barnstaple. The E&CR and the original Taw Vale line to Bideford had been authorised without the requirement to get Board of Trade approval for their gauge.

Four days later, on 12 February 1848 the E&CR directors announced that they had changed the gauge of their line to "the national gauge". They had now exceeded their authorised capital and borrowings, so they obtained authority in the Exeter and Crediton Railway Amendment Act 1850 (13 & 14 Vict. c. xxiv) of 10 June 1850 to increase the capital by £20,000 in what would nowadays be called a rights issue. Their act also authorised enlargement of their Cowley Bridge station.

Finally the LSWR had promoted, with its allies, a line from Salisbury to Exeter, which was approved, but on 28 June 1848 a link line from its independent Exeter station to reach Cowley Bridge was rejected. For the time being the E&CR, and therefore all the North Devon lines, were isolated.

=== Achievements to 1850 ===
With work on the TVER at a standstill for lack of cash, and the double-track E&CR line completed but not operating, there was little to show for all the frenzied activity, and huge expenditure, of the preceding years. In fact the sole tangible outcome was that the original Taw Vale line from Barnstaple to Fremington had opened on the narrow gauge in August 1848; it was operated by horse traction, for goods traffic only. His lease expired on 18 May 1850 and the Taw Vale board did not permit its allocation because of damage to the track by horses.

== Openings ==
=== The E&CR opens ===
For the time being, the broad gauge interest was the only network with the resources to assist the North Devon lines. The E&CR, chaired by William Chapman, who was also the chairman of the LSWR, obtained the shareholders' approval on 28 February 1851 for a lease of their line to the B&ER; the B&ER would do everything necessary to work the line; and the lease would expire seven years after the opening of the Crediton to Fremington line.

The E&CR was to reinstate broad gauge on one line of the double track, and pay the B&ER to install the essential junction at Cowley Bridge. This was quickly done, with the second narrow gauge line being left disconnected. Captain Mynne of the Board of Trade inspected the line and approved it, and a ceremonial opening took place on 12 May 1851. A passenger service of seven trains each way started immediately. The stations were Newton St Cyres and Crediton; the Cowley Bridge station was not now required and was never opened.

=== Opening from Crediton to Barnstaple ===
North Devon Railway and Dock Act 1851
- Act of Parliament
- Parliament of the United Kingdom
- Long title: An Act for authorizing certain Deviations in the Taw Vale Extension Railway, and for other Purposes.
- Citation: 14 & 15 Vict. c. lxxxiii

Dates
- Royal assent: 24 July 1851

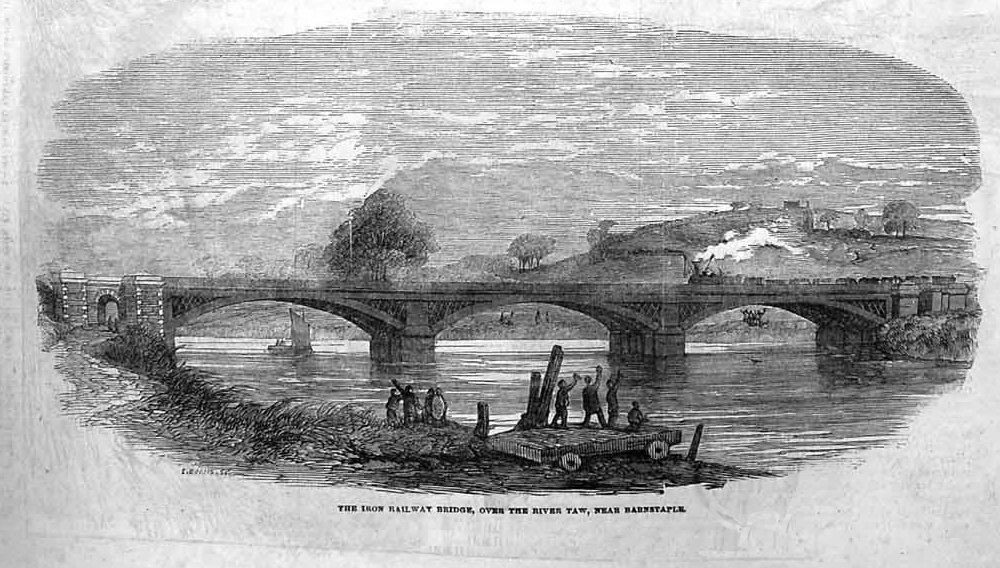
The iron railway bridge over the River Taw south of Barnstaple in 1854

The TVER had suspended work due to lack of cash, and it was now time for it too to reappraise the situation. 20% of the shares had been forfeited, but many landowners had been induced to accept shares for the purchase of necessary land; it was proposed to return to Parliament to reduce the capital of the company and to authorise numerous deviations, so that the line could be opened as a single broad gauge line. This was approved by the North Devon Railway and Dock Act 1851 (14 & 15 Vict. c. lxxxiii) of 24 July 1851 which also changed the company's name; the railway has since been generally referred to as the North Devon Railway (NDR). £50,000 in new shareholdings was required and the directors exerted themselves considerably to canvass for this, finally being successful in December 1851.

The first sod of the new construction was cut on 2 February 1851; Thomas Brassey was the contractor, and the line was to be leased to him, but hiring in rolling stock from the B&ER.

On 30 June 1854 Captain Tyler of the Board of Trade made his inspection of the Crediton to Barnstaple section; it was not proposed to open the Barnstaple to Fremington line until the continuation to Bideford was ready. (In fact the powers for this had not been renewed, and they lapsed.) He made some comments regarding signal positions and observed that the track was broad gauge on cross sleepers "with double I rails": flat bottom rails. It was single line broad gauge throughout, with the electric telegraph installed throughout the line.

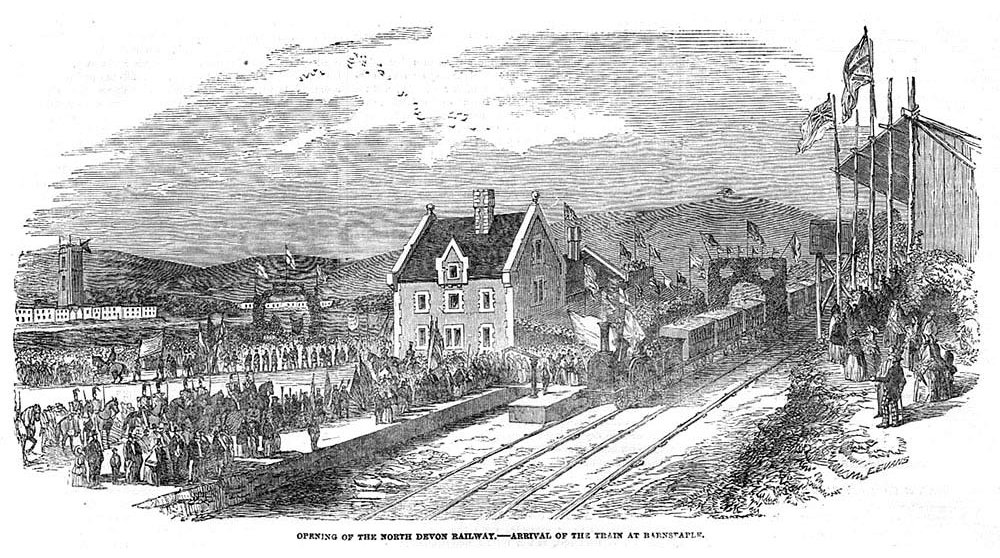
Opening ceremony of the North Devon Railway at Barnstaple

A ceremonial opening from Crediton to Barnstaple took place on 12 July 1854, but due to Tyler's requirements, the full public opening was delayed until 1 August 1854. There were four trains each way on weekdays, and two on Sundays.

The stations were:

- Yeoford
- Copplestone
- Morchard Road
- Lapford
- Eggesford
- South Molton Road
- Portsmouth Arms
- Umberleigh
- Chapelton siding; became a passenger station 8 June 1857, and closed 19 April 1860. Reopened 1 March 1875. There have been several alternate spellings, including Chapeltown and Chappletown.
- Barnstaple

Brassey operated the line, at first using the B&ER rolling stock contracted in by the NDR directors, but after 28 July 1855 he provided his own stock. Engines were changed at Crediton on through trains.

=== Bideford Extension Railway ===
Bideford Extension Railway Act 1853
- Act of Parliament
- Parliament of the United Kingdom
- Long title: An Act for making a Railway from the North Devon Railway at Fremington Pill to Bideford, to be called "The Bideford Extension Railway."
- Citation: 16 & 17 Vict. c. cxl

Dates
- Royal assent: 4 August 1853

As the North Devon Railway had allowed the powers for the Bideford line to lapse, that town now was at a disadvantage. Commercial interests in the town formed the Bideford Extension Railway themselves, getting powers in the Bideford Extension Railway Act 1853 (16 & 17 Vict. c. cxl) on 4 August 1853; the line opened on the broad gauge on 2 November 1855, worked by the North Devon Railway Company. As a result, the Barnstaple to Fremington section of the original Taw Vale Railway now got its passenger service for the first time. The Bideford station was at East the Water, somewhat north of the town bridge and on the opposite side of the River Torridge from the town.

== Narrow gauge again ==
=== The LSWR reaches Exeter ===
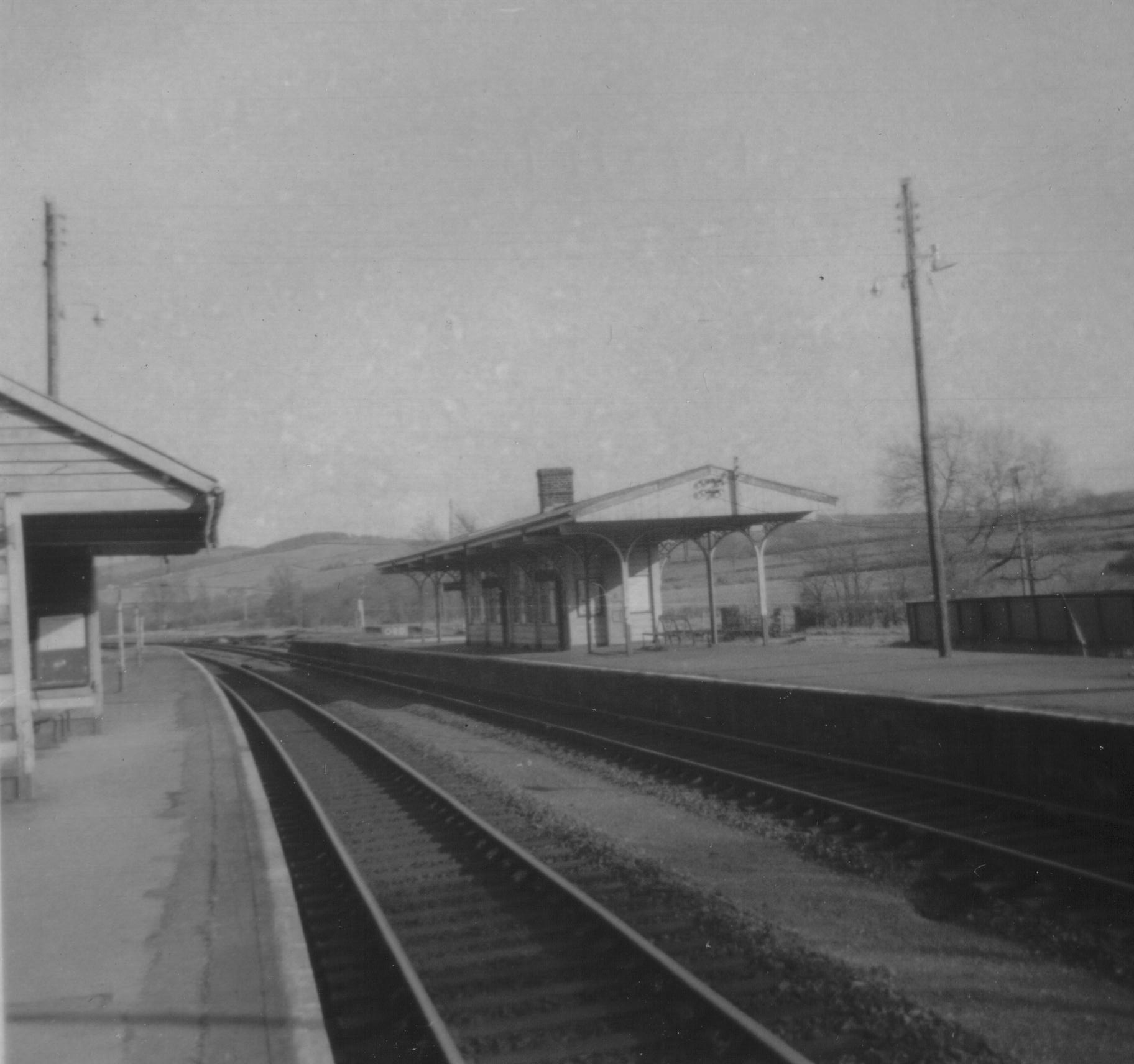
Yeoford station in 1969

The LSWR had long had designs on securing territory in Devon and it had been extending westwards from Salisbury. On 18 July 1860 it reached Exeter with its main line from Yeovil, terminating at its own Exeter station, referred to as Queen Street, and much later renamed Exeter Central. That station was much more convenient for the city than the Bristol and Exeter company's St Davids station. Public services started the following day.

Hostility between the LSWR and the broad gauge companies had subsided, so that it was possible to negotiate access for the LSWR to the North Devon lines, which lay the other side of the B&ER main line. Agreement was reached, and ratified by Parliament in the London and South Western Railway (Exeter and North Devon) Act 1860 (23 & 24 Vict. c. ciii) of 3 July 1860. This authorised the construction of a connecting line from Queen Street to St Davids; the laying of mixed gauge track on the B&ER from there to Cowley Bridge Junction; the leasing by the LSWR of the E&CR, NDR and Bideford Extension lines and to mix their track gauge. The B&ER was to retain powers to run goods trains to Crediton.

The E&CR shareholders ratified a seven-year lease to the LSWR, from 1 January 1862; narrow gauge trains ran to Crediton from 3 February 1862.

The North Devon Railway (NDR) and the Bideford Extension Railway extended their lease to Brassey until 31 July 1862; from the next day the LSWR took over the leases and ran trains from Bideford to Exeter. As the NDR and Bideford Extension were still broad gauge, the LSWR leased Brassey's rolling stock for a year.

Col. Yolland of the Board of Trade inspected the Queen Street to St Davids connection on 27 January 1862 and passed it. Being informed that the LSWR proposed to operate narrow gauge trains to Crediton from the 3 February he objected, on the basis that there had been no inspection for narrow gauge running. The LSWR started their narrow gauge service notwithstanding, but Yolland inspected the line on 19 February. He found it satisfactory, but commented adversely on the curve at Cowley Bridge, which had been sharpened considerably when the first viaduct over the River Exe there had been reconstructed.

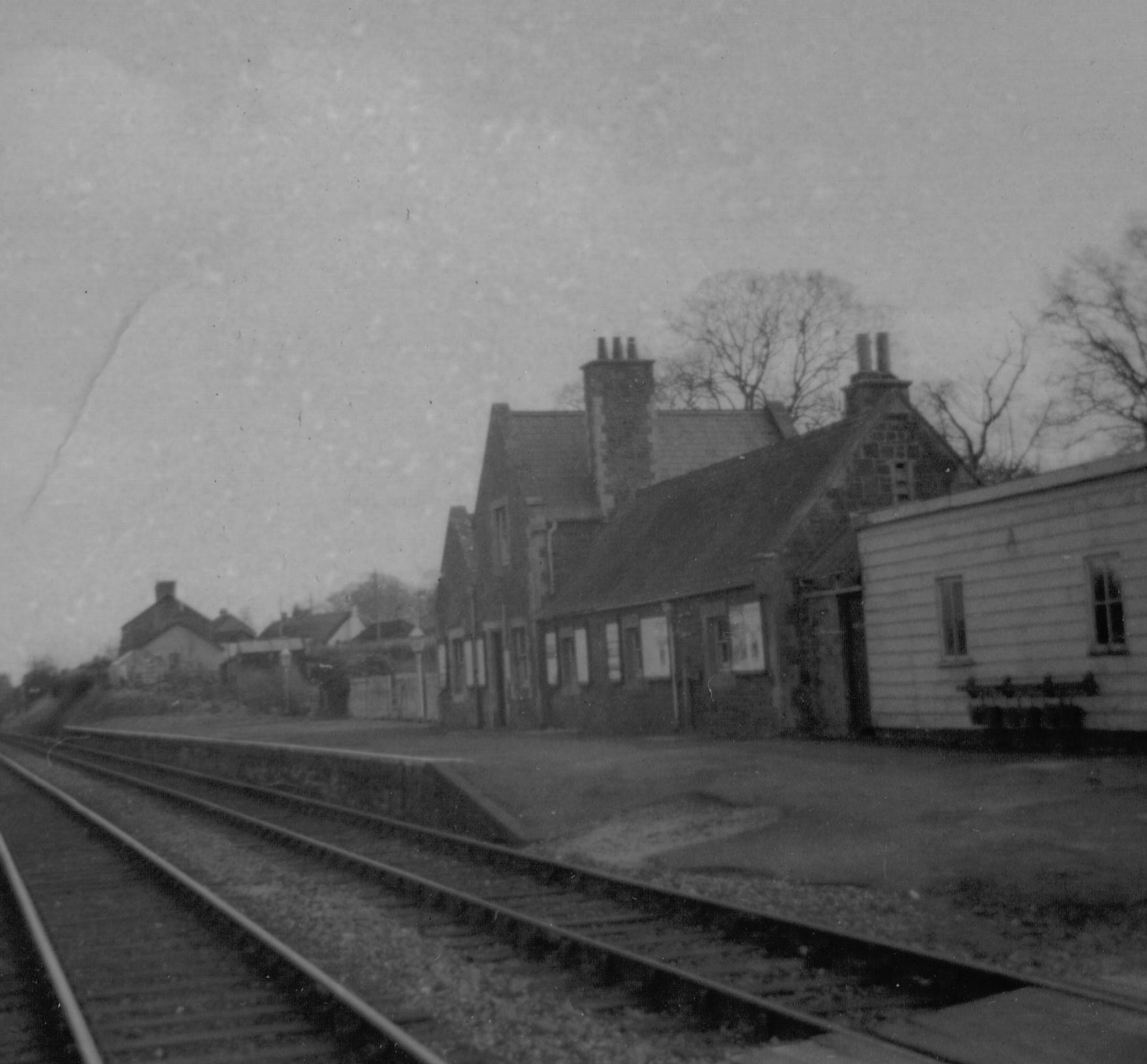
Copplestone station in 1969

Yolland made a further inspection, this time of the North Devon and the Bideford Extension lines, following their conversion to mixed gauge. He reported on 26 February 1863 that the original standard of engineering had been poor, and the long period of inactivity had led to deterioration; and he commented adversely on the switching arrangements for transferring narrow gauge trains from one side of the broad gauge line to the other at station platforms. The LSWR attended to the specific items and gave assurances regarding general maintenance, and were able to run narrow gauge trains between Crediton and Bideford from 2 March 1863. Brassey's lease of the Exeter & Crediton expired in July 1862; the LSWR had taken over the Exeter & Crediton and laid mixed gauge on it. It ran narrow gauge passenger trains from Exeter Queen Street to Crediton, from 1 February 1862; remarkably also broad gauge through coaches operated from Bideford to Paddington and Bristol, on the broad gauge of course, operated west of Exeter by the LSWR as successor to Brassey. The Bristol & Exeter continued to run broad gauge goods trains to Crediton until 20 May 1892.

=== Amalgamation of the Devon lines ===
The North Devon Railway and Dock Company and the Bideford Extension Railway were now ready to be absorbed by the LSWR, and amalgamation took effect on 1 January 1865, authorised by the South-western Railway (Various Powers) Act 1864 (27 & 28 Vict. c. ccxxvii) of 25 July 1864. This meant that the LSWR was now supreme in North Devon, and could use the lines as a launching pad to push on to Plymouth and Cornwall; but the Exeter and Crediton Railway was left independent, although most of the shares were owned by the LSWR and B&ER together.

== Onward from the North Devon Railway ==
=== On to Plymouth ===
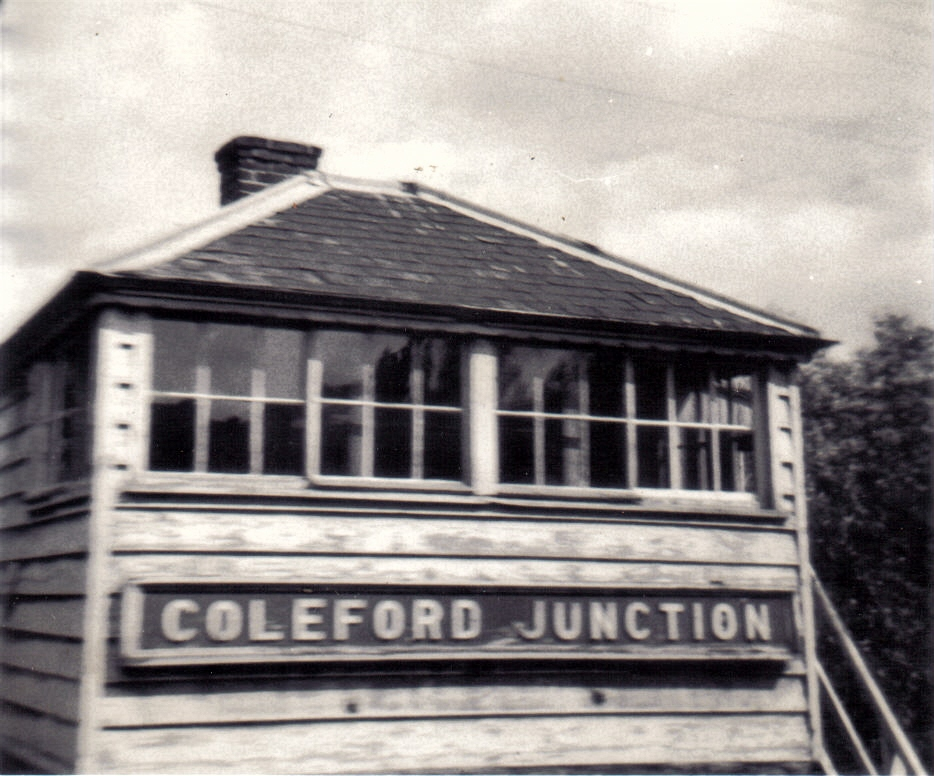
Coleford Junction signal box in 1970

Already on 17 July 1862 the Okehampton Railway, supported by the LSWR, had obtained the Okehampton Railway Act 1862 (25 & 26 Vict. c. clxv) for a standard gauge railway to Okehampton, leaving the North Devon line west of Yeoford, at Colebrook. The following year, the Okehampton Railway Act 1863 (26 & 27 Vict. c. cxxix) authorised extension to Lidford on the newly authorised Launceston and South Devon Railway, and this was followed up by the Okehampton Railway (Extensions to Bude and Torrington) Act 1865 (28 & 29 Vict. c. cxlix). This altered the company's name and allowed a new site for the junction at Yeoford station. The LSWR made arrangements to lease the line. It was opened to the public as far as North Tawton on 1 November 1865. On 17 May 1876 the line reached Lidford (old spelling) on the broad gauge Launceston line. Narrow gauge rails had been installed on the relevant portion of that line, and LSWR trains could now reach Plymouth and Devonport over the mixed gauge from Lidford. These trains used the Exeter and Crediton line, greatly improving its profitability from the toll charges.

=== Torrington ===
South-western (North Devon) Railway Act 1865
- Act of Parliament
- Parliament of the United Kingdom
- Long title: An Act for authorizing the London and South-western Railway Company to make and maintain a Railway from Bideford to Great Torrington, and for other Purposes.
- Citation: 28 & 29 Vict. c. civ

Dates
- Royal assent: 19 June 1865

Text of statute as originally enacted

As part of the tactics of gaining control of parts of the West Country, the LSWR had given an undertaking in the South-western (North Devon) Railway Act 1865 (28 & 29 Vict. c. civ) to extend the line from Bideford to Torrington. It tried to evade this responsibility, calculating that the declining importance of the town of Great Torrington – the "Great" was never acknowledged by railway usage – did not justify the expense of the line, but it was forced to comply with its obligations. It opened to a new passenger station at Bideford, immediately east of the town bridge, on 10 June 1872; the original terminus was unsuitable for use on the extension, and became the town's goods station. Onward from Bideford to Torrington was opened on 18 July 1872.

=== Ilfracombe ===
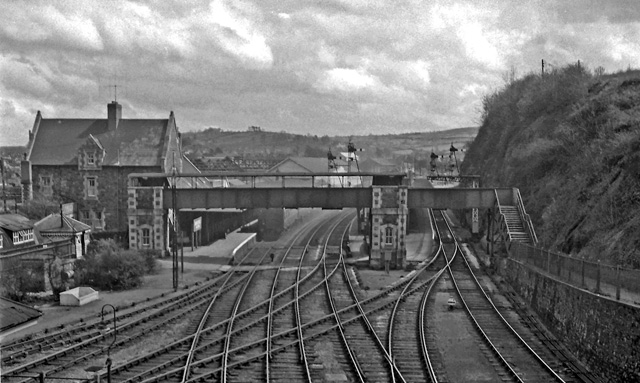
Barnstaple Junction in 1960

With the rise of seaside holidays, and with the LSWR wishing to encourage the development of resorts that catered to that, and which brought the fruits of seaside industries as well, an extension to Ilfracombe became obvious. The Barnstaple and Ilfracombe Railway was incorporated on 4 July 1870 by the Barnstaple and Ilfracombe Railway Act 1870 (33 & 34 Vict. c. cx), supported by the LSWR, it opened its line on 20 July 1874, and as worked by the LSWR. It crossed the River Taw by a curved bridge there and provided a new Barnstaple Town station – the original station was on the south side of Barnstaple Bridge, and was referred to as the Old Station, but became formally known as Barnstaple Junction. As first offered to the Board of Trade Inspector, Lt Col Hutchinson, the old station necessitated changing passengers to cross the line on the level; a footbridge was required and duly provided.

=== Broad gauge from Taunton ===
In 1873 a broad gauge railway reached Barnstaple; it was the Devon and Somerset Railway (D&SR), which ran from a junction near Taunton to an independent, unconnected station at Barnstaple. Because of the attraction of Ilfracombe, road coaches conveyed passengers between the D&SR station and the resort. The Great Western Railway (as successor to the Devon and Somerset Railway) contemplated building its own independent line from the Devon and Somerset station at Barnstaple onwards to Ilfracombe, but in fact it proved possible to come to an agreement with the LSWR for through running. Accordingly, the GWR obtained authority in the Great Western Railway Act 1885 (48 & 49 Vict. c. cxlvii) to build a connecting line at Barnstaple. At first this was to run direct from the approaching Taunton line, by-passing the existing GWR station, but at a late stage this was altered to run between the GWR station and the LSWR Junction station. Through trains from Taunton therefore required to reverse at the GWR station. (Note: Until 1905 when the direct spur was commissioned.) The line opened on 1 June 1887, and through coaches to Ilfracombe started to run. At first the GWR insisted on the through coaches conveying passengers from GWR stations to Ilfracombe only, and not to other LSWR stations, but the restriction was later removed.

== Modernising ==
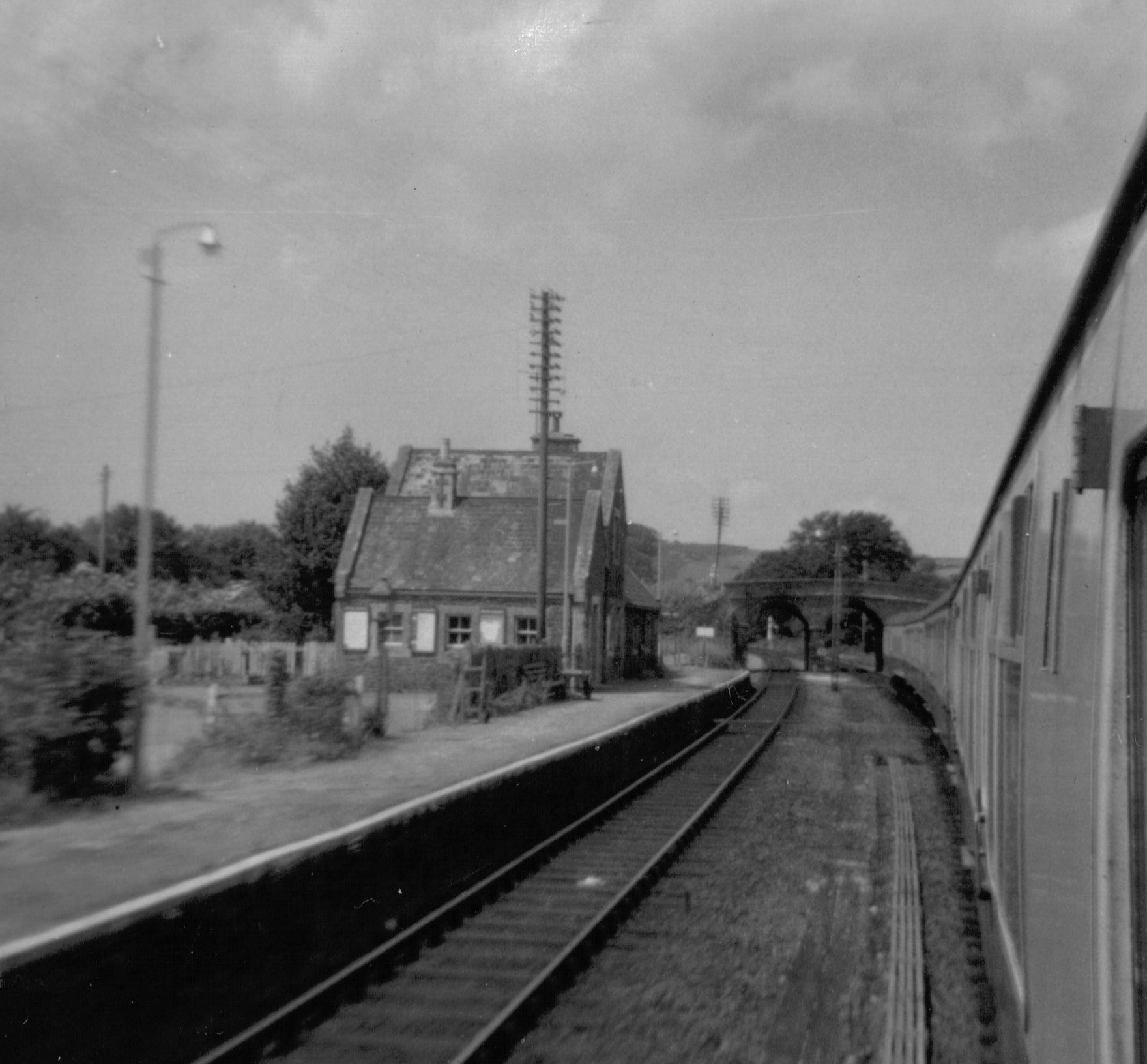
Umberleigh station in 1970

The original North Devon line was signalled using disc and crossbar signals. With a considerable network in Devon now open or in course of completion, there were greatly increasing traffic volumes, and the LSWR decided to modernise the signalling. On 1 October 1873 most of the stations from Copplestone to Umberleigh were equipped with semaphore signals and block instruments using Preece's three wire system.

Single track had become a serious limitation, and the LSWR took powers to double much of the line, including the Exeter and Crediton section and the junction approach at Cowley Bridge, and the provision there of a new signal box in addition to the B&ER one. The portion to Crediton was still mixed gauge, so the doubling was mixed as well, and numerous bridge needed to be reconstructed. The loop at Cowley Bridge was opened on 11 November 1874, followed by the line from there to St Cyres on 23 February 1875. The short section from the Cowley Bridge loop to the B&E junction was opened on 2 June 1875, and St Cyres to Crediton was opened as double track the same day. From Crediton to Yeoford was doubled on 1 June 1876.

The LSWR was able to remove the obligation to maintain broad gauge tracks beyond Crediton; this had been used by a single daily broad gauge goods train for several years. The last broad gauge train beyond Crediton ran on 30 April 1877. Following this, the line from Yeoford to Coleford Junction (the point of divergence of the Lidford line) was doubled in standard gauge only on 16 May 1877.

The LSWR continued the doubling towards Lidford, completing it on 22 December 1879.

The South Western Railway (Exeter and Crediton and North Devon) Act 1876 (39 & 40 Vict. c. cxvi) of 13 July 1876 authorised the doubling by the LSWR of the Exeter and Crediton section had also permitted purchase of the line. After some delay this purchase was concluded on 26 June 1879. The valuation of the E&CR was £217,687 of which the LSWR already owned 60%.

Great Western Railway goods trains continued to run to Crediton for the time being, but in 1892 the GWR converted all its remaining broad and mixed gauge track to standard gauge. During the period of intensive work, on 22 May 1892 the GWR ran a standard gauge night mail train from Paddington to Plymouth over the LSWRR route while its own line was being worked on.

Meanwhile, double track from Coleford Junction to Copplestone was opened on 4 November 1883. This was followed by doubling from Umberleigh to Pill Bridge, a location about a mile south of Barnstaple Junction. Pill Bridge was a substantial crossing of the tidal River Taw; there were three spans of over 80 feet, and when the bridge had been completed for double track, this last section to Barnstaple Junction, opened as double track on 27 July 1891.

The intermediate section from Copplestone to Umberleigh was also to be doubled, and powers were obtained and a contract let; however at this time the LSWR concluded a traffic pooling agreement with the GWR and decided not to proceed, cancelling the contract; earthworks and some bridgeworks had been executed, and £75,640 expended, but the section was never doubled.

== From 1923 ==
Following the exhaustion of the railways of Great Britain in the First World War, Parliament decided to force amalgamation of most of the railways into four new companies. This was brought about by the Railways Act 1921 and is usually referred to as the grouping. The LSWR became part of the new Southern Railway from 1923.

The Southern Railway became especially effective in marketing, and the train service from London to the Devon lines was given a boost when the principal express from London, leaving Waterloo at 11 a.m., was named the Atlantic Coast Express. The train conveyed portions for the respective branches in Devon, detached successively at junction stations; at the busiest summer period the train ran in multiple portions throughout from London.

=== South of Torrington ===
At Torrington the line met the Torrington and Marland Railway, a narrow gauge line opened in 1880 to carry ball clay. In 1925 part of this line was converted to standard gauge and extended to Halwill Junction station as the North Devon and Cornwall Junction Light Railway.

== Twentieth century train service ==
As a rural railway, the North Devon group originally had the light train service that was normal. Development of the North Devon seaside towns as holiday resorts took place towards the end of the nineteenth century, although they remained far less important than their southern counterparts.

As the rural manufacturing and shipping importance of the area declined, the significance of Crediton, Fremington and Bideford waned also; ball clay however gained importance at Torrington. Barnstaple became the most significant market town in the region, and Ilfracombe became the dominant holiday destination on the North Devon network

The train service in 1938 was eight trains each way daily, calling at all or most stations. In addition there were two through trains from London Waterloo, the Atlantic Coast Express and an unnamed train. The local trains took 80 minutes or so for the journey from Exeter to Barnstaple. The expresses were in truth portions of multiple portion trains; the front portion was detached at Exeter Central and ran non-stop from Exeter St Davids to Barnstaple Junction, dividing there with portions for Ilfracombe and Torrington. Journey time from Waterloo to Barnstaple was typically 4 hrs 20 mins, for a distance of 211 mi (340 km). The best time from Exeter St Davids to Barnstaple Junction in 1938 was 57 minutes for the 39 mi (63 km). On Sundays there were two local trains and the two expresses.

The line from Barnstaple to Torrington had 13 daily trains calling at both intermediate stations, and 7 each way on Sundays. In addition, the original Exeter and Crediton section and the short length to Coleford Junction, carried all the Plymouth traffic.

Economic stagnation in North Devon in the twentieth century meant that the train service failed to develop, and the North Devon lines remained single track. The through London services disappeared with the rationalisation of West Country operations, and in 1964 there were ten stopping trains each way daily from Exeter to Ilfracombe. Barnstaple Junction to Bideford kept nine trains daily, and both routes retained a Sunday service. The Beeching Axe started to impose its cuts, and in 1965 the Torrington branch closed to passengers, in 1970 the Ilfracombe line was closed, and the freight-only Barnstaple to Torrington and Meeth section in 1982.

As of 2022, there are 17 daily trains each way between Exeter St Davids and Barnstaple, most starting / finishing at Exeter Central, with an additional later last train on Fridays, all calling at most or sometimes all intermediate stations and taking on average between 72 and 75 minutes. There are 13 trains each way on Sundays.

== Stations and route ==
=== Exeter and Crediton Railway ===
- Cowley Bridge Junction (with the Bristol and Exeter Railway)
- St Cyres; renamed Newton St Cyres 1913
- Crediton

=== North Devon Railway ===
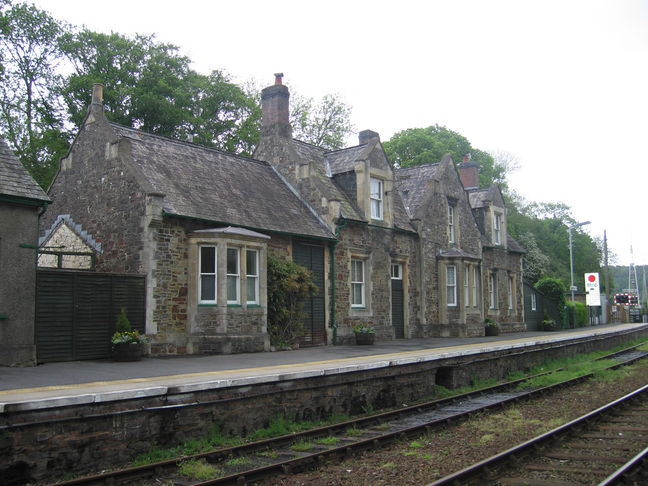
Eggesford in May 2006

- from E&CR Crediton station
- Yeoford
- Coleford Junction; Okehampton line diverges
- Copplestone
- Morchard Road
- Lapford
- Eggesford
- South Molton Road (Renamed Kings Nympton in 1951; South Molton was 9 miles (14.5 km) away and had a Devon & Somerset Railway station)
- Portsmouth Arms
- Umberleigh
- Chapeltown (Renamed Chapelton 1875)
- Barnstaple

Note: Barnstaple station was named Barnstaple Junction between 1874 and 1970, but Cobb dates the addition of "Junction" at 1855.

Barnstaple Town station was built by the Taw Vale Railway and Dock Company for its Fremington line.

=== Taw Vale Railway & Dock ===
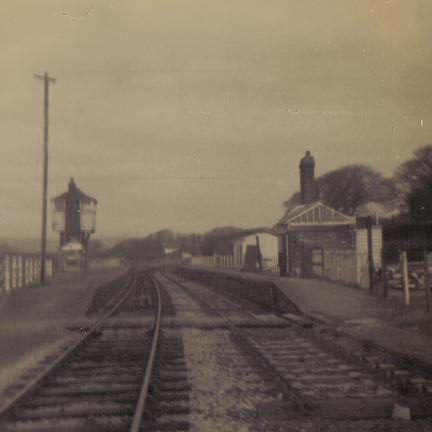
Fremington in 1969.

- Barnstaple (see above)
- Fremington

=== Bideford Extension Railway ===
- starting from the TVER Fremington station
- Instow
- Bideford; The original terminus was north of the town, and it became "Bideford Goods" when the Torrington extension was opened

=== L&SWR Torrington extension ===
- Bideford A new passenger station was provided half a mile nearer the town.
- Torrington; the terminus was awkwardly placed about a mile west of the town.

== North Devon Railway locomotives ==
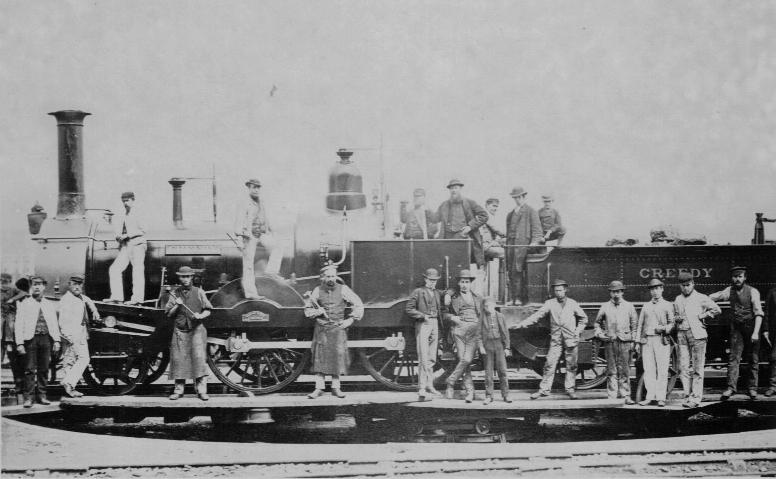
2-4-0 Creedy at Barnstaple

During the line's independent existence, Thomas Brassey worked the line. Most of the locomotives were bought from the Bristol and Gloucester Railway (B&GR), but a few were also built by him at his Canada Works in Birkenhead. Brassey's locomotives continued to operate on the line after the London and South Western Railway bought the line, until it was converted to narrow gauge.

=== Bristol and Gloucester 2-2-2 ===
Five 2-2-2 locomotives originally built by Stothert & Slaughter for the B&GR. These had 6 ft 6 in driving wheels and 3 ft. 6 in. carrying wheels with cylinders of 15 in. dia. × 21 in. stroke.

- Barum (1855–1870) Previously B&GR Berkeley, named after the medieval Latin for Barnstaple – Barumensis.
- Exe (1856–1870) Previously B&GR Bristol, named after the River Exe which follows the railway into Exeter.
- Mole (1855–1870) Previously B&GR Stroud, named after the local River Mole.
- Star (1855–1877) Previously B&GR Cheltenham.
- Tite (1856–1870) Previously B&GR Gloucester. (Note: The architect William Tite had been Chairman of the North Devon Railway.)

=== Bristol and Gloucester 2-4-0 ===
Another Stothert & Slaughter locomotive from the B&GR, where it was named Industry, this one was a 2-4-0 with 5 ft. 0 in. driving wheels and cylinders of 15 in. dia. × 18 in. stroke.

- Venus (1856–1870)

=== Bristol and Gloucester 0-6-0 ===
The final two locomotives obtained from the B&GR were two 0-6-0 goods locomotives built by the Vulcan Foundry. They had 5 ft 0 in. wheels and cylinders 16 in. dia. × 21 in. stroke. Dreadnought was sold to Robert Sharp in 1863, it was moved to Cornwall where he was building the Falmouth extension of the Cornwall Railway.

- Defiance (1857–1867)
- Dreadnought (1856–1863)

=== Creedy ===
Built at the Thomas Brassey's Canada Works, this 2-4-0 featured 5 ft. 0 in. and 3 ft. 0 in. wheels with 20 in. dia. × 15¼ in. cylinders. It worked the first train to Bideford on 2 November 1855. It was a 2-4-0 locomotive, built by Thomas Brassey in his workshops at Birkenhead. It was named after the local River Creedy.

- Creedy (1855–1877)

=== Dart and Yeo ===
Two express locomotives were provided from the Canada Works with 6 ft. 0 in. driving wheels and 3 ft. 6 in. carrying wheels, with a total wheelbase of 14 ft. 2 in. They had cylinders of 20 in. dia. × 15¼ in. stroke.

- Dart (1855–1877) Built in 1855 as a 2-2-2 but rebuilt in 1868 as a 2-4-0. It was named after the River Dart which gives its name to Dartmoor.
- Yeo (1857–1877) A 2-2-2 locomotive. There are three River Yeos in the area served by the railway, two flowing into the River Taw, the other into the River Creedy.

=== Taw ===
This locomotive was built by Robert Stephenson and Company before 1840 as a standard gauge 2-2-2 and rebuilt for the broad gauge in 1855 by Stothert and Slaughter. It was still running in 1859 but was not part of the stock listed for the London and South Western Railway in 1862. It was named after the River Taw that flows to the sea through Barnstaple.

- Taw (1855 – c.1860)

== See also ==
- Bideford and Instow Railway
- Instow signal box
- Southern Railway routes west of Salisbury
- Tarka Trail – which follows the course of the railway in places
