= Bideford railway station =

Former railway station in Devon, England

Coordinates: 51.01581°N 4.19993°W

Bideford
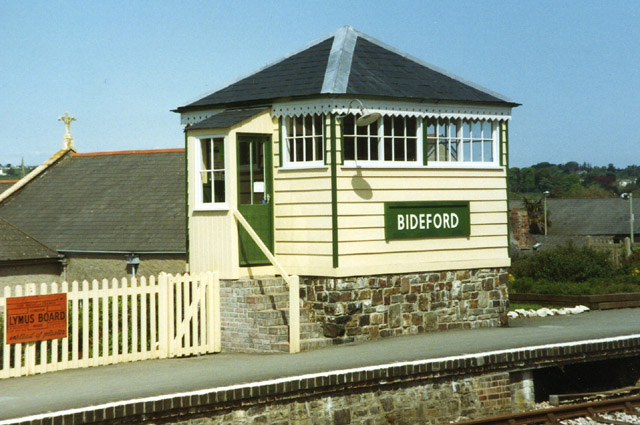
- Replica of Bideford signal box

General information
- Location: Bideford, Torridge; England
- Platforms: 2

Other information
- Status: Disused

History
- Pre-grouping: London and South Western Railway

Key dates
- 2 November 1855: Opened
- 10 June 1872: Resited
- 4 October 1965: Closed to regular passengers
- 1982: Closed completely
Location

The first Bideford railway station was opened on 2 November 1855 as the terminus of the Bideford Extension Railway from Barnstaple. This was taken over by the London and South Western Railway about ten years later.

This station was resited in 1872 when the line was extended to Torrington.

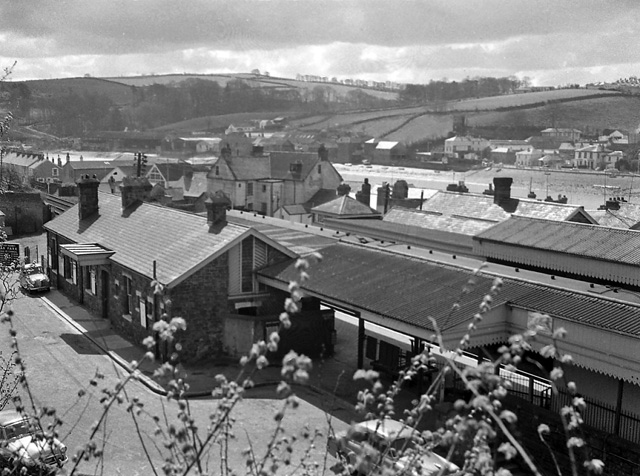
The station in 1964

Regular passenger trains from Barnstaple were withdrawn on Saturday 2 October 1965 although special trains occasionally used the station until the line was finally closed to freight in 1982. After closure a railway preservation society was formed to reopen the station and a short part of the line. Over 220 yards (200 m) of track were laid from the station and some rolling stock and a small diesel locomotive are on site. An occasional train service is operated from April to September and the replica signal box, interactive interpretation centre and cafe are also open during this period. The site is on the Tarka Trail so is accessible even if the centre is closed. See Bideford Railway Heritage Centre.

The remaining station buildings on the down side are owned by the adjacent Royal Hotel and are used for storage.

The station was included on the ATOC Connecting Communities report in 2009, which recommended closed lines and stations which should have a railway service. The report suggested the reopening of the Barnstaple – Bideford railway line. In mid-2021 some members of the Bideford Railway Heritage Centre became actively involved in working towards this objective, with Railfuture, following the example of the government's Reopening Your Railway initiative. What became known as the ACE Rail campaign quickly became adopted by the Tarka Rail Association.

Preceding station	Disused railways	Following station
Instow; Line and station closed	London and South Western Railway	Torrington; Line and station closed
