= Bideford Railway Heritage Centre =

Railway heritage centre in the UK

Coordinates: 51°0′56″N 04°12′4″W

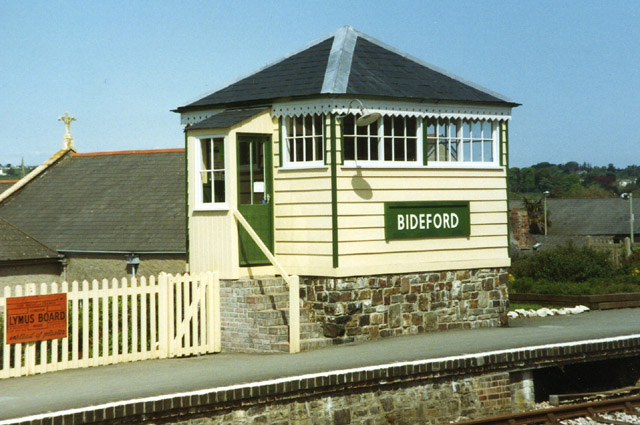
- A replica of the original signal box at Bideford Railway Station

Commercial operations
- Built by: London and South Western Railway
- Original gauge: 4 ft 8 1/2 in (1,435 mm) standard gauge

Preserved operations
- Stations: 1
- Preserved gauge: 4 ft 8 1/2 in (1,435 mm) standard gauge

Commercial history
- Opened: 2 November 1855
- Closed: 6 November 1982

Preservation history
- 1988: Society formed
- Headquarters: Bideford, Devon

Website
- www.bidefordrailway.co.uk

The Bideford Railway Heritage Centre CIC (previously the Bideford and Instow Railway Group) in Devon, England is a community interest company that is responsible for the management of the site of Bideford railway station. The company is also responsible for Instow signal box which opens on occasional Sundays and bank holidays from Easter to October.

== History ==
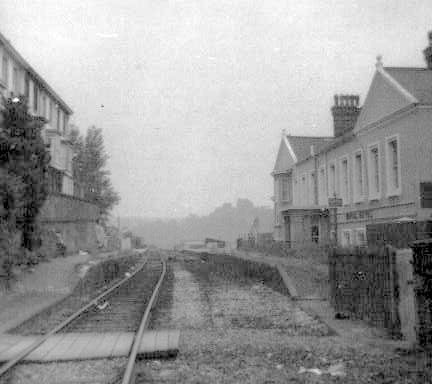
Bideford railway station in June 1969

The line was opened from Barnstaple to Fremington in 1848. Passenger trains ran throughout from Barnstaple railway station to Bideford from 2 November 1855 as the Bideford Extension Railway. The line was further extended to Torrington in 1872 when the current Bideford railway station was opened.

Passenger services ceased on 2 October 1965 although ball clay traffic continued until 1982. The track was removed in 1985 after some interest by British Rail in reintroducing a passenger service to Bideford. The trackbed was later converted into the Tarka Trail, a walkway using the formation between Petrockstow (later the terminus of services after the line was truncated in the 1960s) and Barnstaple Junction. The trail now incorporates the UK's longest continuous traffic-free cycle path.

In 2009, James May attempted to reconnect the former Bideford station with Barnstaple Junction using an OO scale model train as part of James May's Toy Stories. Unfortunately, the last train - a Hornby Class 395 "Javelin", and the prototype model for the production models - burnt out at Instow at 12:18am the day after the trains left Barnstaple. In 2011, May returned to complete the challenge with the help of the German model railway attraction Miniatur Wonderland, racing several model trains over the 9.89 miles (15.92 km) from Barnstaple to Bideford. The first train to arrive at Bideford was a Hornby Intercity 125, followed by a hydrogen-powered train and finally, May's own model of LNER 'Pacific' 4472 Flying Scotsman.

== Visitor attractions ==
The Bideford Railway Heritage Centre has developed the site since 1989 to ensure a preservation presence at the old Bideford station. A replica of the original signal box was built in 1991 and signal levers were installed in 2004. An interactive interpretation centre was opened in the green PMV (Parcels and Miscellaneous Van) in 2019. Short passenger rides are given at Bideford on dates announced on the website www.bidefordrailway.co.uk, using the Planet diesel locomotive. The site has been fully renovated and is open from Easter to the end of October at weekends and school holidays with a cafe in the Mark 1 coach for visitors. The site is accessible from the Tarka Trail even when the station site is not open.

== Rolling stock ==
The Railway has the following items of rolling stock.

- Hibberd Planet diesel locomotive No.3832, operational.
- BR Mk1 TSO 4489, Used as a cafe and is painted in BR Green.
- SR PMV 2142, Holds the Interactive Interpretation Centre.
- BR Toadfit brake van B954757, Under overhaul.

== See also ==
- Other local railway attractions:
  - Lynton and Barnstaple Railway
  - Lynton and Lynmouth Cliff Railway
  - Dartmoor Railway
