= Torrington and Marland Railway =

Narrow gauge railway in Devon

Coordinates: 50.952°N 4.149°W

Overview
- Headquarters: Marland
- Locale: England
- Dates of operation: 1880–1971
- Successor: Abandoned

Technical
- Track gauge: 3 ft (914 mm)
- Length: 6 1/4 miles (10.1 km)

The Torrington and Marland Railway was a 3 ft (914 mm) narrow gauge built to carry clay from the quarries at Clay Moor to Torrington in north Devon.

== History ==
The line was surveyed in 1879 by John Barraclough Fell who was also the consulting engineer to the nearby Pentewan Railway. Fell's survey was notable for its use of ten wooden viaducts, which were an unusual feature for a British railway.

The railway was a private line, built to serve clay traffic, but part of the agreement with the landowners over whose land it passed was that it would carry local passengers. Steam locomotives were used on both the main railway and the internal lines in the clay pits.

In 1925 the main line was replaced with a standard gauge branch of the North Devon and Cornwall Junction Light Railway. The Torrington and Marland was cut back to a 1 1/2-mile (2.4 km) stub and the internal quarry lines. These continued in use until 1971 when the line finally closed.

== Locomotives ==
Number	Name	Builder	Type	Date	Works number	Notes
1	Mary	Black, Hawthorn & Co	0-6-0ST	1880	576	Scrapped 1925
2	Marland	W.G. Bagnall	0-6-0T	1883		
3	Peter	Stephen Lewin	0-4-0ST	c. 1870		Scrapped 1925
4	Merton	Fletcher Jennings	0-4-0+T	1880		Constructed from pieces of three Fletcher Jennings locomotives.
11		Avonside	0-6-0ST	1901	1428	Scrapped 1925

== See also ==
- British narrow gauge railways
- Tarka Trail
