= Two Castles Trail =

Long-distance footpath in Devon and Cornwall, England

- Length: 24 mi (39 km)
- Location: Devon and Cornwall
- Trailheads: Okehampton/Launceston
- Use: Hiking

The Two Castles Trail is a waymarked long-distance footpath in Devon and Cornwall, England. It runs for 24 miles (39 km) from Okehampton in Devon to Launceston in Cornwall, linking the two Norman castles of Okehampton and Launceston.

The trail passes through the villages of Bridestowe, Lewdown and Lifton. Between Okehampton and Bridestowe, the trail coincides with the West Devon Way.
