= Tarka Trail =

Series of rail trails in Devon, England

The Tarka Trail is a series of rail trails around north Devon, England, that follow the route taken by the fictional Tarka the Otter in the book of that name. It covers a total of 180 miles (290 km) in a figure-of-eight route, centred on Barnstaple.

The 31-mile (50 km) section between Braunton and Meeth is car-free, level and mostly tarmacked, and is shared by pedestrians and cyclists, with horseriding also permitted on part of it.

The remainder of the route covers a wide variety of landscapes, including wooded river valleys, moorland, coastal cliffs and sandy beaches. Walking varies from easy through to moderate and strenuous, depending on the location, but it is comprehensively waymarked.

The trails are a popular tourist destination and bicycle hire businesses are available for those who wish to cycle along suitable sections of the trail. A section of the Trail is part of National Cycle Network route number 27 and forms part of the route known as the Devon Coast to Coast Cycle Route a route of 99 miles (159 km) from Ilfracombe to Plymouth largely using former railway lines

== History ==
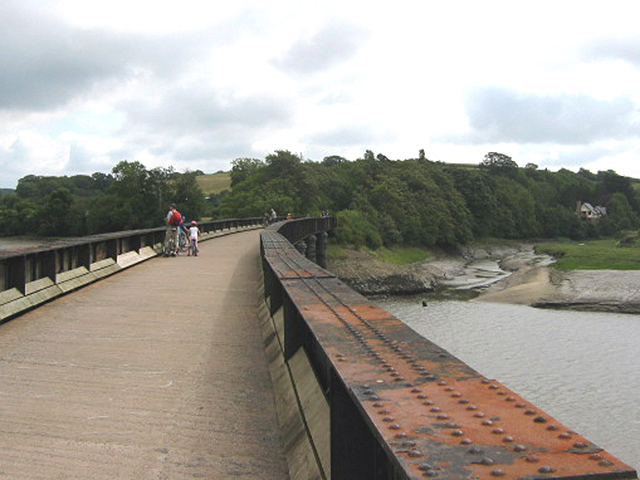
The Tarka Trail crossing the River Torridge, just south of Bideford, using the former railway bridge

The Tarka Trail was established in 1987, as the Taw/Torridge Country Park using the disused railway line between Barnstaple and Bideford; the railway line was purchased for £515,000 in 1986-87 from British Rail.

In 1989, the remainder of the line between Bideford and Meeth was acquired in its entirety by Devon County Council for £1. Conversion of this section to a footpath was enabled by a £60,000 Derelict Land Grant from central government in 1989–90, plus a further £100,000 from Devon County Council and the Countryside Commission in 1990–91. A large proportion of the money was needed to adapt and repair bridges across the River Torridge.

Parish councils, Dartmoor and Exmoor National Park Authorities and the National Trust played a part in the development of the rest of the trail. Their consultation and co-operation ensured low environmental costs while retaining a large degree of accessibility to the trail. Even the Otter conservation officer was involved to ensure there would be no disturbance to otters where the Trail followed water courses.

The section between Barnstaple and Bideford was opened on 21 May 1991 and was made into a combined footpath and cyclepath. The section from Barnstaple to Meeth was named the Tarka Country Park. Once the southern circuit was also incorporated, the Trail spanned 180 miles (290 km). It was opened by Prince Charles in May 1992. The Tarka Country Park identity was finally subsumed by the Tarka Trail in 1994. The route to Meeth was converted into a cycle/walkway in 1997. It was delayed by a quarry covering the line of the old railway.

== Disused railways ==
Several sections of disused railway line have been used to create the trail. These have the benefit of being relatively flat, with only small uphill and downhill gradients. The paths also run across many former railway bridges, which command notable views over various rivers and valleys. Railway buildings restored on the route include the station buildings at Bideford and Torrington and the signal box at Instow.

Former railway sections include:

- Ilfracombe Branch Line – between Braunton and Barnstaple
- North Devon Railway (Torrington branch) – between Barnstaple, Bideford and Torrington
- North Devon and Cornwall Junction Light Railway - between Torrington and Meeth Halt.

Below Braunton, the path follows the western bank of the River Caen, which was straightened to become the Braunton Canal in the 1850s, before following the northern edge of Horsey Island, reclaimed from the estuary at the same time. The path then turns north along the eastern edge of Braunton Burrows, an extensive sand-dune system leased by the Ministry of Defence for army training. The dunes are closed for 10 days per year for this purpose.

== Places of interest ==
- RMB Chivenor
- Bideford Railway Heritage Centre, which also manages Instow signalbox
- Beam, Great Torrington, birthplace of Tarka the Otter
- Tarka Valley Railway
- Bake and Brew West Yelland.

== Towns and villages ==
The Tarka Trail passes through numerous towns and villages, including:

- Braunton
- Chivenor
- Barnstaple
- Fremington
- Yelland
- Instow
- Bideford
- Torrington
- Petrockstow
- Meeth
- Hatherleigh
- Okehampton
- Lynmouth
- Ilfracombe
- Lee Bay
- Mortehoe
- Woolacombe
- Dolton
- North Tawton

== Intersecting paths ==
Local walking routes which intersect or coincide with the Tarka Trail:

- South West Coast Path – route coincides between Ilfracombe and Bideford
- Two Moors Way – route coincides for part of the way through Exmoor
- Macmillan Way West – route coincides between Barnstaple and Exmoor
- Dartmoor Way – route coincides
- West Devon Way
- Two Castles Trail
- Little Dart Ridge and Valley Walk.

== Transport ==
Using public transport for at least part of their journey means that walkers can plan walks that start and finish at different places, rather than have to circle back to their start point.

=== Railway ===
The trail may be reached from stations on the Tarka Line, the railway from Exeter St Davids to Barnstaple. Great Western Railway services to some stations are infrequent and, at several, the trains only stop on request.

=== Buses ===
Most towns and villages along the Tarka Trail have bus services, although some of these may not be very frequent. The trail officially ends at Meeth Halt station, although cyclists and walkers can catch Stagecoach South West's 317 bus that leaves regularly from The Bull and Dragon pub to complete the circular trip; the route connects Bideford and Okehampton.

== See also ==
- Dartmoor Way
- The South West Coast Path
- Rail trail
- The Camel Trail
- Two Moors Way
- West Devon Way
