= Devon Belle =

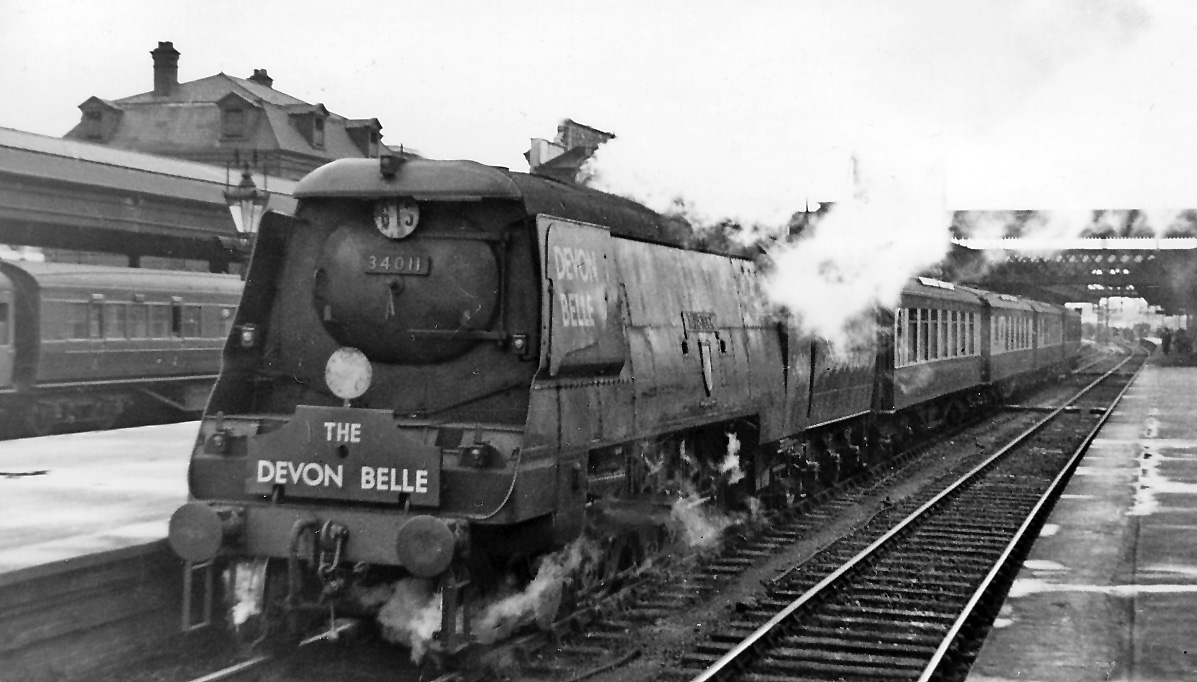
- Up 'Devon Belle' at Exeter St Davids

Overview
- Service type: Luxury express train
- Status: Discontinued
- Locale: England
- First service: 20 June 1947
- Last service: September 1954
- Former operator: Southern Railway (SR)

Route
- Termini: London Waterloo; Ilfracombe only till 1949: Plymouth
- Stops: Saturday timetable summer 1953: Sidmouth Junction, Exeter Central, Exeter St Davids, Barnstaple Junction, Barnstaple Town, Braunton, Morthoe
- Distance travelled: 230 mi (370 km)
- Average journey time: 5 hours, 27 minutes
- Service frequency: 1947: only summer weekends 1950: Mon, Tue (eastbound), Thu (westbound), Fri, Sat, Sun
- Lines used: complete train: South Western Main Line, West of England line Plymouth section: Exeter–Plymouth line Ilfracombe section: Tarka Line; Ilfracombe branch line

Technical
- Rolling stock: Locomotives: London–Exeter: Merchant Navy class; West of Exeter: Light Pacific; Coaches: Section to Plymouth: Four Pullman coaches; Section to Ilfracombe: Eleven Pullman coaches; One observation car

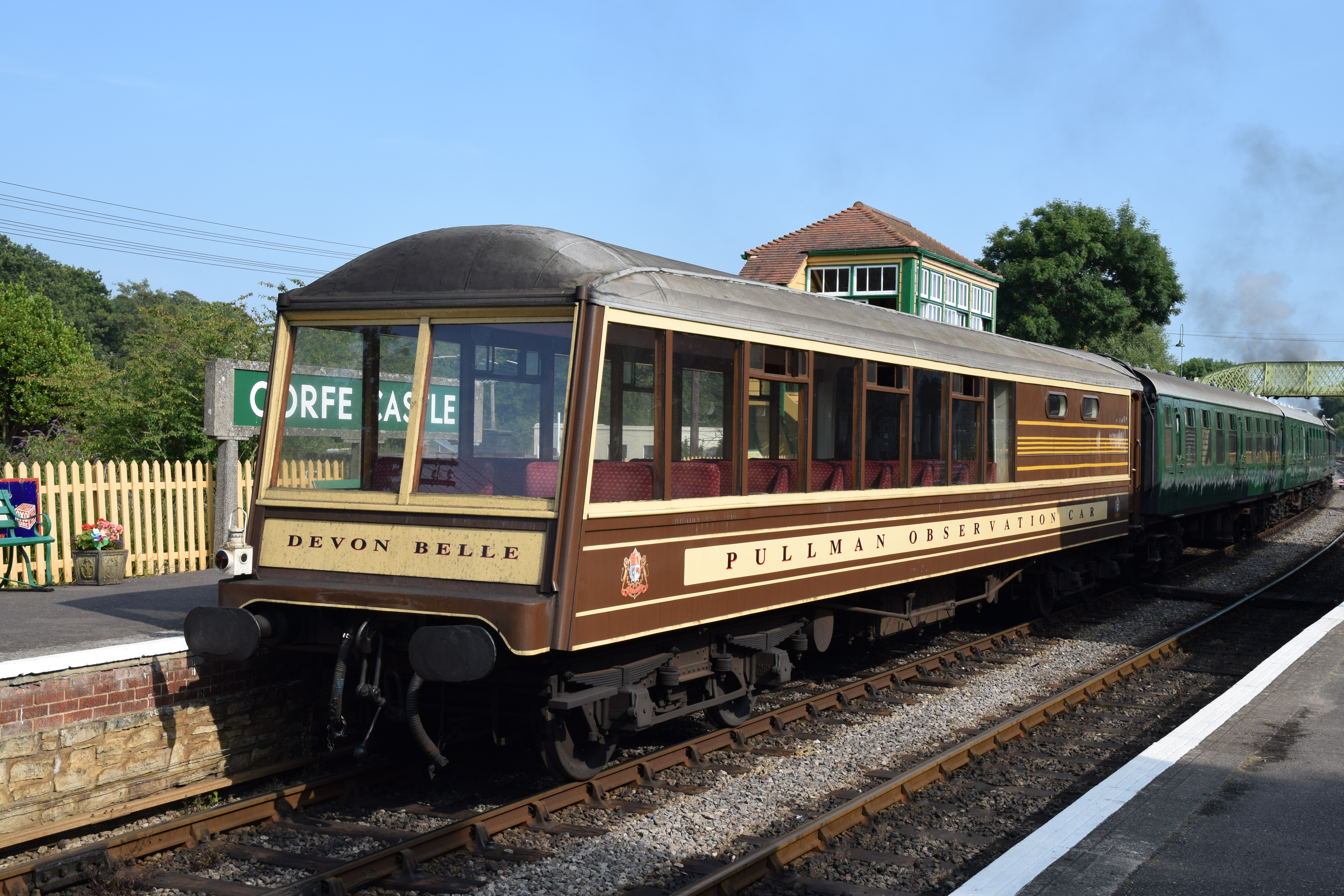
A Devon Belle observation car as now running in preservation in Dorset

The Devon Belle was a luxury express passenger train in England which ran between London Waterloo station and Ilfracombe and Plymouth in Devon in the years from 1947 to 1954.

== The train ==
The Southern Railway was eager to resume normal leisure activities after the war years, and it commenced operation of the train on 20 June 1947. It set high standards for comfort and luxury, and it was made up entirely of Pullman coaches. Two unusual features of the train were that all seats were reservable (not a common facility at the time) and the observation car, attached at the rear for the benefit of passengers to and from Ilfracombe.

The Southern Railway was especially adept at publicity, and both the westbound and eastbound trains started their journey at mid-day, and uniquely the train ran non-stop between London and Sidmouth Junction, a distance of 160 miles. The throughout journey time was about five and a half hours.

At this time all other trains on the Southern Railway's West of England main line stopped at Salisbury for water and to trim the tender coal, as the Southern Railway did not have water troughs. To enable the non-stop run, the train made an unadvertised stop at Wilton, a small station two miles west of Salisbury, for an engine change.

The train headboards had a red background unlike the customary green nameboard backgrounds on Southern Railway express trains. Three boards were used: one on the locomotive's buffer beam, and one on each side of its smokebox, mounted on the smoke deflectors.

Following the war, Britain was in a state of economic austerity for several years, and a luxury train service involving a supplementary fare was a difficult concept to sell. Despite initial popularity, the train was not as much of a success as hoped, and the Plymouth portion was dropped in September 1949. Services were further reduced in 1952 and withdrawn entirely at the end of the 1954 summer season.

The Southern ran three Pullman trains with the suffix Belle. The others were the Brighton Belle (originally the Southern Belle) and the Bournemouth Belle. British Railways introduced the Thanet Belle (later renamed the Kentish Belle) in 1948.

== Traction and rolling stock ==
Usually, the train was hauled by a Merchant Navy class 'Bulleid Pacific' locomotive between Waterloo and Exeter Central, with Light Pacific locomotives handling the train west of that point. The normal formation was for four carriages to form the Plymouth portion, and eight to form the Ilfracombe portion, although longer trains were sometimes needed. The use of powerful locomotives was essential on the Ilfracombe Branch, due to the very steep gradients and sharp curves on that section of line. For the eastbound departure from Ilfracombe, it was usually necessary for assistance to be provided by a bank engine for the 1 in 36 climb from the terminus to Mortehoe & Woolacombe station.

== The observation cars ==
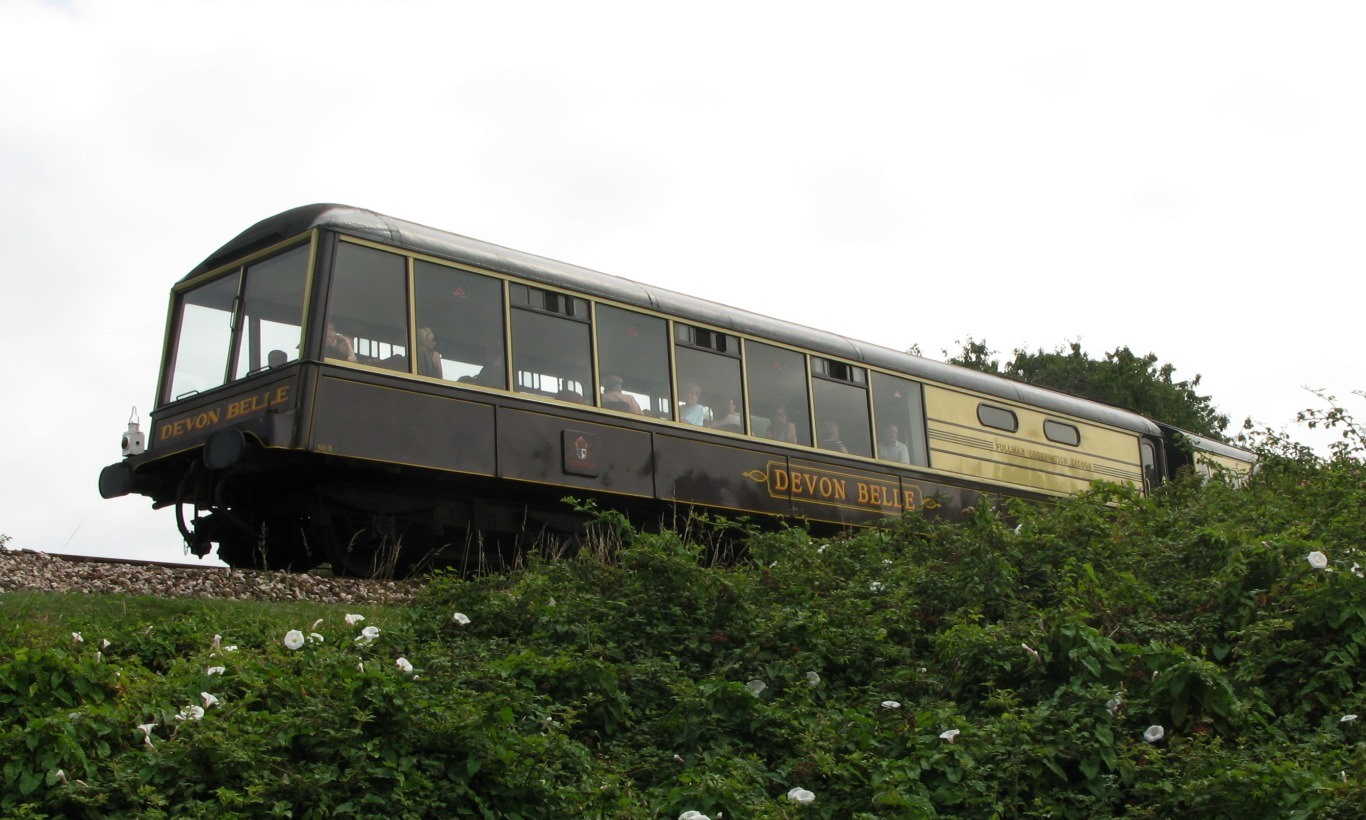
No. 13 in use on the Paignton and Dartmouth Steam Railway

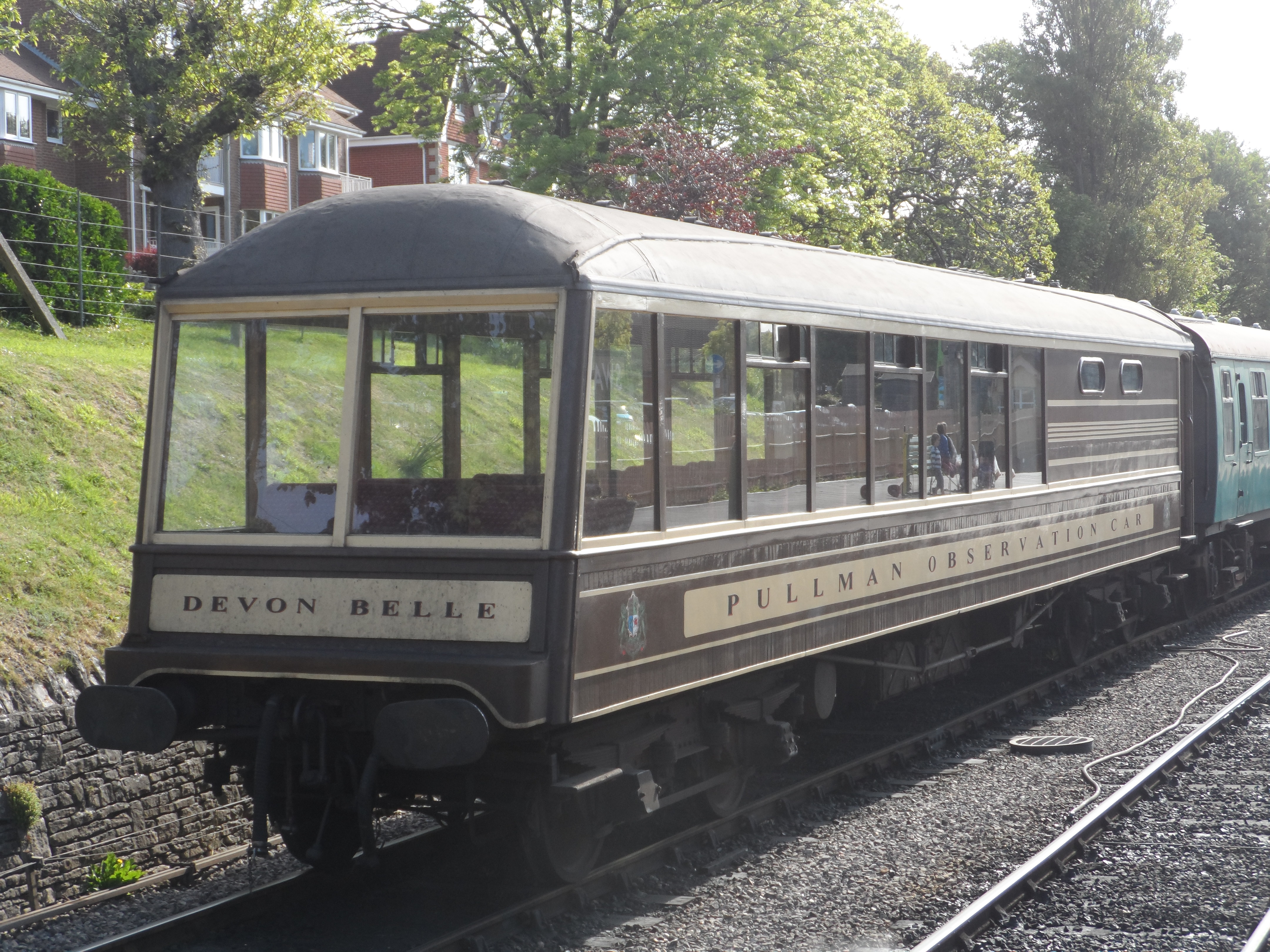
No. 14 in use on the Swanage Railway

Two distinctive observation cars were used on the service. They were numbered 13 and 14, and both had started life as other vehicles. No. 14 was a London and North Western Railway ambulance coach of 1918 that was converted into a Pullman car in 1921. It was rebuilt as a bar car in 1937.

Both carriages were remodelled as observation cars in 1947, especially for the Devon Belle service. They had seating for 27 passengers, and a bar for a drinks service. This latter work was undertaken at Pullman's Preston Park works, Brighton.

The observation cars were 'single-ended', due to the large windows that allowed passengers to see out from the back of the train. The carriages therefore had to be turned on the turntable at the end of each journey for the return journey. This could be a difficult operation at Ilfracombe station, as the site was exposed to the winds from the Atlantic Ocean.

After use on the Devon Belle the cars were transferred to the London Midland Region, repainted and renumbered 280 and 281, curiously with an 'M' suffix, despite their origins. M280M (ex 13) was used for a couple of seasons on 'The Welsh Chieftain' Land Cruise train in north Wales and M281M (ex 14) on charter services. In 1961 the cars were transferred to the Scottish Region for use on the lines between Inverness and the Kyle of Lochalsh, and from Glasgow to Oban.

=== Preservation ===
Both observation cars have been preserved in England and are still in revenue-earning service: No. 13 is based on the Dartmouth Steam Railway in South Devon (having originally been preserved by the Dart Valley Railway, down the South Devon Railway), where it re-entered service at the start of the 2018 season following an overhaul the previous year, while No. 14 is now at the Swanage Railway in Dorset, after a large-scale publicity tour in North America.

No. 14 went to the USA in 1969 for a tour accompanying the Flying Scotsman. Due to financial difficulties, the carriage could not be shipped home immediately, and it remained in America and was attached to an office building in San Francisco. As the building was unoccupied, the owner donated No. 14 to a preservationist and it was subsequently repatriated to the Swanage Railway UK on 13 January 2007 at a cost of around £60,000.

No. 14 arrived in the UK at Southampton Docks on 26 February 2007, having travelled by ship via the Panama Canal, and was then immediately transported by road to Ramparts railway workshops at Derby where restoration work was carried out, including the refitting of the interior, retaining the Watneys pub modelled 'The Firemans Rest' bar from the USA tour. It returned to the Swanage Railway on 16 May 2008 and was officially re-launched into service on 16 July 2008. It was eventually reunited with the Flying Scotsman in early 2019 for first time in nearly 50 years.

== Sample timetable ==
In the summer of 1950 the westbound train left Waterloo at 12:00, and called at Sidmouth Junction (15:16), Exeter Central (15:35 - 15:40), Exeter St Davids (15:46), Barnstaple Junction (16:43), Barnstaple Town, Braunton, Mortehoe and arrived at Ilfracombe at 17:27.

The eastbound train left Ilfracombe at 12:00, calling at Mortehoe, Braunton, Barnstaple Town, Barnstaple Junction (12:37), Exeter St Davids (13:33), Exeter Central (13:38 - 13:42), Sidmouth Junction (14:04) and arrived at Waterloo at 17:20. (The journey time from Waterloo to Exeter St Davids was 15 minutes longer than the Atlantic Coast Express required, stopping only at Salisbury.)

The train ran on Mondays, Tuesdays (eastbound), Thursdays (westbound), Fridays, Saturdays and Sundays in the summer of 1950. Unusually, the advertised schedules were identical every day of the week on which the train ran.
