= Atlantic Coast Express =

Express passenger train in England

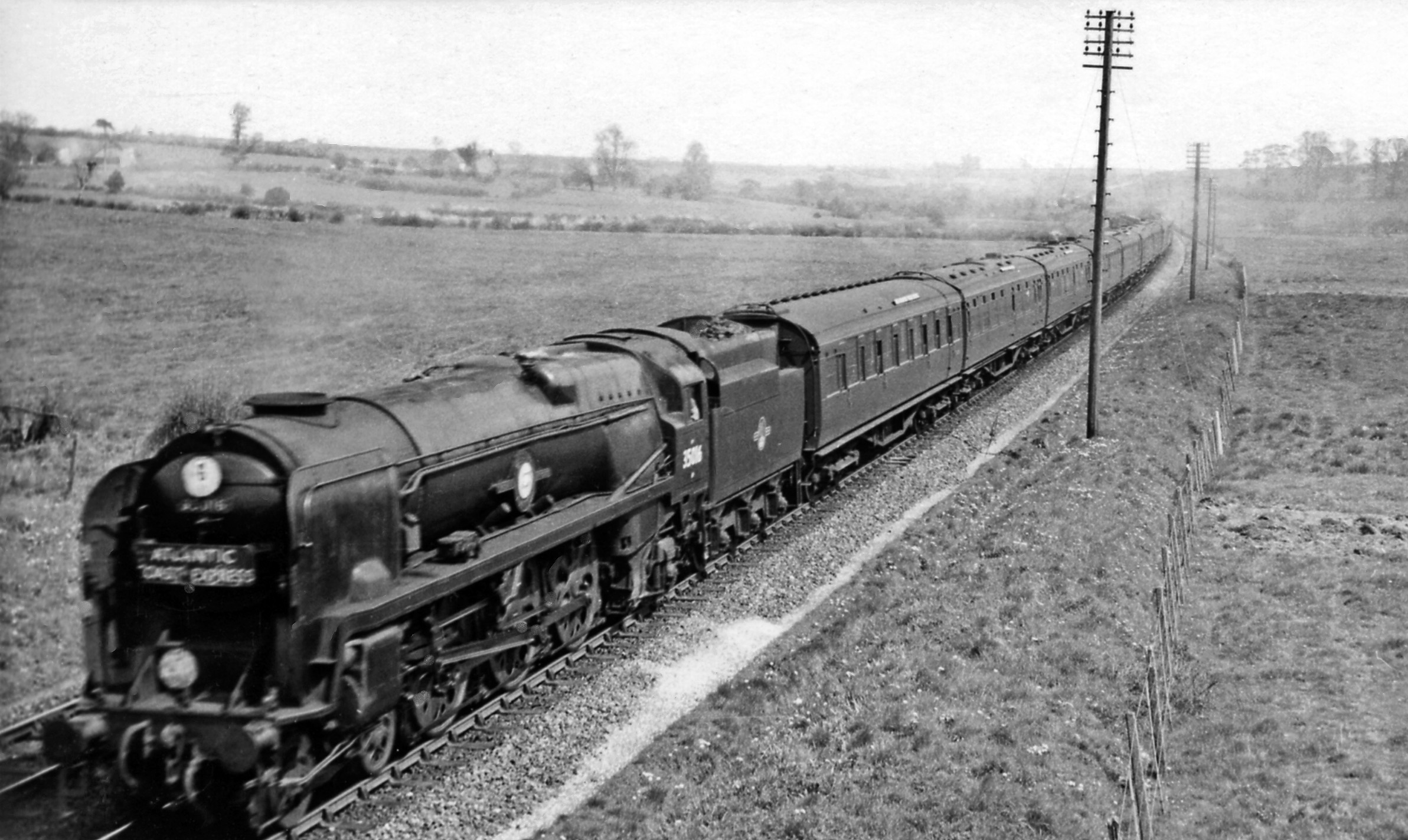

Overview
- Service type: Passenger train
- First service: 19 July 1926
- Current operator: Great Western Railway
- Former operators: British Railways; Southern Railway

Route
- Termini: London Paddington; Newquay
- Average journey time: 5 hours 20 minutes
- Service frequency: Monday-Saturday summer only
- Train numbers: 1C99 (westbound); 1A94 (eastbound)
- Lines used: Great Western; Reading to Taunton; Taunton to Exeter; Exeter to Plymouth; Cornish; Atlantic Coast

Technical
- Rolling stock: Class 802/1
- Operating speed: 125 mph

The Atlantic Coast Express (ACE) is an express passenger train in England that has operated at various times between London and seaside resorts in the South West England. It is currently operated as a summer only service by Great Western Railway between London Paddington and Newquay.

== The origins ==
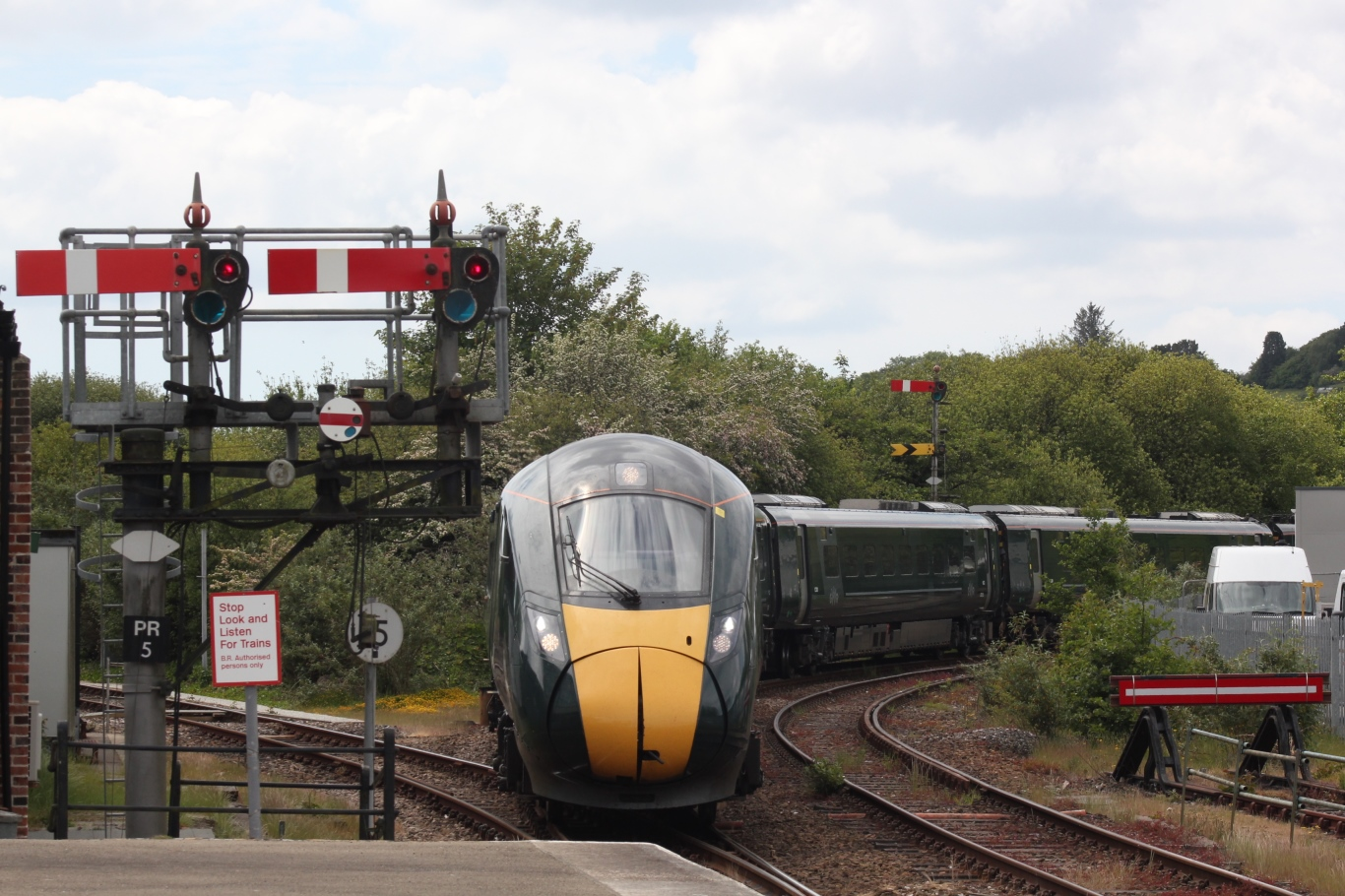
Great Western Railway Class 802 IET with a westbound Atlantic Coast Express at Par in May 2019

After completion of the lines to Bude in 1898 and Padstow in 1899, the London & South Western Railway (L&SWR) introduced the first North Cornwall Express in 1900 leaving London Waterloo at 11:10, and this continued over the next decade as the North Cornwall & Bude Express with the departure time adjusted to 11:00 running during the summer only. By 1914 this train was running throughout the year, and outside the summer season carried through coaches to Padstow, Bude, Plymouth and Ilfracombe, a presage of things to come. However World War I reduced both the scope for holidays and stretched the railway's resources, and after this the L&SWR did not pursue a policy of having a premier named train on the route.

This was set to change as a result of the 1923 Railway Grouping Act which created four new companies to run Britain's railways, and the former London & South Western Railway became part of the new Southern Railway. The Great Western Railway (GWR), as the main competitor for services to Devon and Cornwall, had been left virtually unchanged by the railway company mergers, and the directors of the new Southern Railway recognised that some initiative was needed to publicise their services to the South West, and in addition show they were ready to compete with "the old enemy" once more; the GWR had coined the phrase Cornish Riviera and had been using this in its publicity for 20 years.

John Elliot, a public relations assistant to the Southern Railway, proposed to the board in December 1924 that the next batch of express passenger locomotives be named after characters from Arthurian legend, and that a named train be introduced. The name was chosen as the result of a competition run in the staff magazine and the winning entry was submitted by Mr F. Rowland, a guard from Woking who won a prize of three guineas for suggesting Atlantic Coast Express. He was soon to move to Great Torrington in North Devon; he was killed in a shunting accident there six years later. It made its inaugural run on 19 July 1926.

== The route ==
From the beginning the ACE effectively had five destinations, three in Devon and two in Cornwall.

Plymouth, by far the largest city in Devon, was served via Okehampton and Tavistock. The steep gradients and tortuous nature of the route beyond Exeter meant that it was not possible to compete with the Great Western Railway's Cornish Riviera Express in terms of speed, but it was a useful alternative route, particularly for passengers from the South and South East of England, who could make a connection at Salisbury and thus avoid travelling via London.

Halwill Junction was the junction for the two Cornish destinations: Bude, a small but growing resort on the most northerly part of the Cornish coast; and Padstow, a fishing port at the mouth of the River Camel and the Southern Railway's most distant outpost almost 260 miles from Waterloo. At the junction, the Bude carriages were detached and the Padstow section turned south to Launceston, skirting the edge of Bodmin Moor before reaching Camelford. A swift descent to Wadebridge followed, through countryside described by Poet Laureate John Betjeman. The route was completed following the River Camel.

The North Devon portions of the ACE followed the route from Exeter Central through Crediton to Yeoford before turning north west and reaching the valley of the River Taw at Lapford. Thereafter the line hugged the river to Barnstaple Junction, the junction for the two North Devon destinations of the ACE. From here the Torrington portion followed the estuary of the Taw westward to Instow before turning south along the River Torridge to Bideford and its destination of Great Torrington. The portion for Ilfracombe, another port that owes its status as a holiday destination to the coming of the railways, continued northwards. Started from Barnstaple Junction, the branch for Ilfracombe headed north through Barnstaple Town and on to Braunton before climbing steeply to Mortehoe and then descending more steeply to the terminus at Ilfracombe.

At various times Exmouth, Sidmouth, Seaton Junction and Lyme Regis had through coaches.

== The service ==
The heavy reliance on holiday passengers meant that the volume of traffic was very seasonal. On Summer Saturdays, the ACE consisted of up to five trains departing from Waterloo in the 40 minutes before 11:00, stretching resources on the long single-track branch lines to the limit. In the winter timetable, one train was sufficient for all of the branches, and stops were made at all but the most insignificant stations west of Exeter. Significant delays were frequent at the junctions, as coaches were detached or attached and shunted between the various sections of the train, belying the name of "Express".

In later years, a carriage was detached at Salisbury to join a following stopping train along the main line, and two carriages were detached at Sidmouth Junction, one for Sidmouth and one for Exmouth via Budleigh Salterton. The restaurant and buffet cars were normally removed during the major division at Exeter Central.

Saturdays were always the busiest and in August 1939 the ACE was shown in Bradshaw's Guide as five separate trains departing from Waterloo; serving Ilfracombe (10:36), Padstow (10:40), Ilfracombe again (10:47), Bude (10:54) and a final departure at 11.00 with portions for Padstow, Bude and Plymouth.

Services continued in much the same pattern until the outbreak of World War II, which necessitated longer trains and substantial deceleration on all lines, rendering named trains no longer appropriate.

== The zenith ==
With the end of hostilities the Southern Railway lost no time in reintroducing its most prestigious express. The company's locomotive design department, under its innovative Chief Mechanical Engineer, Oliver Bulleid, had been working during the war years; Bulleid's two new designs of express locomotive, the Merchant Navy class Pacifics for services between Waterloo and Exeter Central and the lighter West Country and Battle of Britain class for the branches beyond, enabled improvements in timekeeping and reliability and facilitated the introduction of heavier trains. Initially there was little increase in overall speeds owing to the poor state of the track, which had suffered neglect during the war.

The 1950s marked the highpoint of the ACE, with the first mile-a-minute timing on the Southern Region (as the Southern Railway had become after nationalisation of the railways in 1947) with a 12:23 arrival in Salisbury, 83 miles from Waterloo. Gradual improvements in schedules continued until the final acceleration in autumn of 1961, when the journey time from Waterloo to Exeter Central came down to 2 hours 56 minutes.

== Terminal decline ==
In common with lines all over the country, the 1960s were a period of steady decline for services to the West Country as car ownership increased.

In 1963 control of all lines west of Salisbury was handed over to the Western Region – still the hated Great Western Railway to most of the Southern employees – and changes to the ACE followed swiftly. From June 1963 the Bude, Torrington and Plymouth through carriages were withdrawn except on summer Saturdays. The remaining services survived through the following summer until, on 5 September 1964 West Country locomotive 34023 Blackmoor Vale hauled the last ACE out of Padstow, and the last coaches of the Atlantic Coast Express arrived there from Waterloo behind N Class locomotive 31845.

The radical pruning of the railway system from 1966 by Dr Richard Beeching affected the West Country. Torrington lost its passenger services in 1965, the North Cornwall branches in 1966, the Plymouth line in 1968, and Barnstaple to Ilfracombe in 1970.

== Revival in the 21st century ==
In 2008 First Great Western revived the name for a new summer only daily service from London Paddington to Newquay operated by High Speed Trains. As at May 2018, this departs London Paddington on Mondays to Fridays at 09:03 and Newquay at 15:06, and on Saturdays departs London Paddington at 11:35 and Newquay at 11:30.

First Devon & Cornwall previously ran a regular bus service from Exeter to Bude, via Okehampton and Holsworthy (service X9), which was branded Atlantic Coast Express, with this name appearing on the indicator board of the bus and also on bus stops. The bus had to make a diversion around the back streets of Holsworthy to avoid a low bridge – one of the surviving overbridges of the old railway route.

The Bluebell Railway operates some of its Mark 1 coaching stock with ACE roofboards. While there is no chance of reopening all the routes of the ACE, some significant sections may soon see the return of passengers. The Bodmin & Wenford Railway plans to extend 5 miles west from Boscarne Junction into Wadebridge in the future (although only the last mile of this will be over the route of the ACE). The Launceston Steam Railway wants to extend its short narrow-gauge line further west along the North Cornwall line as far as Egloskerry, and to provide winter services using a railmotor.

The course of the Barnstaple to Bideford route is retained, and there is an active campaign for reopening. The Exeter to Plymouth route beyond Okehampton via Tavistock has been considered for reopening, partly due to population growth in Tavistock, and partly because of coastal erosion of the South Devon Railway sea wall at Dawlish.
