= The Train Now Departing =

1988 British documentary series

- Written by: Anthony Smith
- Narrated by: Anthony Smith
- Country of origin: United Kingdom
- Original language: English
- No. of episodes: 6

Original release
- Network: BBC Two
- Release: 1988 – 1988

The Train Now Departing: Twenty Years After the End of Steam is a 1988 BBC Two documentary series about railways that was broadcast 20 years after the end of steam on British Railways. It was written and narrated by Anthony Smith. A book to accompany the series was also published by BBC Books with photographs by Ivo Peters.

== Episode list ==
There were six 30 minute episodes:

Episode No.	Episode Title	UK Broadcast Date	Description
1	"The Long Drag"	15 November 1988	The most dramatic steam route is over the Pennines on the Settle-Carlisle railway. Complete with magnificent viaducts and awesome tunnels hacked through solid rock, it was the last railway to be built by pick and shovel. But this historic line faces an uncertain future...
2	"The West Highlander"	22 November 1988	62005 at Mallaig railway station On Scotland's West Highland railway engine driver Callum MacRaild is back on the locomotives he loves. We join him as his crowded holiday train is steam-hauled through breathtaking scenery and listen to nostalgic stories of cooking kippers on the coal shovel.
3	"The Holiday Line"	29 November 1988	Steam enthusiast Barry Smith delights in his childhood memories of the 'Atlantic Coast Express'. But retracing the route from Waterloo to Exmouth leaves him in no doubt that the journey is no longer the best of the Summer holidays.
4	"Steam on the Isle of Man"	6 December 1988	Unaffected by mainland modernization, the Isle of Man's 114 year old Steam Railway rolls on. Now a valuable asset to the Island's booming tourist industry, we visit the famous line and delight in its Victorian elegance.
5	"Lines of Industry"	13 December 1988	The steam locomotive - universal workhorse of the Industrial Revolution is gone - but forgotten or unrecorded. Today conservationists are renovatin rust-ing locomotives and rolling stock, while we can watch Ivo Peters' unique archive film of many industrial lines long since closed.
6	"The Survivors"	20 December 1988	The 80s - an age of enthusiasm when the Preservation of steam locomotives in museums and on working railways like the Bluebell Line in Sussex are not only a reminder of the power and glory of steam but also a part of Britain's growing tourist industry.

== VHS releases ==
#	VHS name	Release date	Episode story
1	Part 1	4 September 1989	Includes: The Long Drag, The West Highlander and Lines of Industry.
2	Part 2	4 September 1989	Includes: The Holiday Line, Steam on the Isle of Man and The Survivors.

== See also ==
- Steam Days
