= Ilfracombe railway station =

Ilfracombe railway station may refer to:

- Ilfracombe railway station (England), a former railway station in North Devon, England, United Kingdom
- Ilfracombe railway station, Queensland, a railway station in Queensland, Australia
