= Steam Days =

- End title card
- Genre: Travel documentary
- Written by: Miles Kington
- Presented by: Miles Kington
- Composer: Roger Limb
- Country of origin: United Kingdom
- No. of episodes: 6

Production
- Executive producers: Neil Cameron; Peter Walton
- Producer: Clive Holloway
- Editors: Geoffrey Moore; Mike Freeman
- Running time: 30 min

Original release
- Network: BBC Two
- Release: 8 July – 12 August 1986

Steam Days is a 1986 BBC Two television documentary series written and presented by Miles Kington. Each episode is themed around the history of British steam locomotives and railways, particularly highlighting preserved locomotives operating at the time of its filming. The series consists of six half-hour episodes. It aired on Public Television stations in the United States under the title Great Steam Trains. Two episodes, "Going Great Western" and "The Fishing Line" are available to watch on the BBC Archives website. The whole series subsequently became available to watch on the BBC iPlayer. but until 8 December 2017 and is currently not available.

== Episode list ==
Episode No.	Episode Title	UK Broadcast Date	Description
1	"Travels with a Duchess"	8 July 1986	46229 Duchess of Hamilton A journey over the Settle to Carlisle Railway on Duchess of Hamilton. The presenter meets Kim Maylon, the Duchess's custodian at the National Railway Museum in York for the engine's preparation for its epic trip.
2	"The Fishing Line"	15 July 1986	44767 George Stephenson on the Mallaig Line Miles Kington takes a LMS Black Five from Fort William to Mallaig on the West Highland Line, examining Glenfinnan Viaduct and investigating the importance of kippers and dental drills to the construction of the line.
3	"Workhorses"	29 July 1986	47383 Examines the unsung role of goods engines during the age of steam.
4	"Quest for Speed"	22 July 1986	4498 Sir Nigel Gresley Charts the development of the fastest express passenger locomotives from the Stirling Single to 4468 Mallard via the City of Truro
5	"Going Great Western"	5 August 1986	5051 Drysllwyn Castle and 4930 Hagley Hall The history of the Great Western Railway from the days of Isambard Kingdom Brunel and the broad gauge Iron Duke to the development of the Cornish Riviera.
6	"A Tale of Two Scotsmen"	12 August 1986	4472 Flying Scotsman Explores the history of the "Flying Scotsman" - both the 4472 Flying Scotsman locomotive and the train of the same name running up the East Coast Main Line from London to Edinburgh. This episode also evaluates the line's many appearances in film.

== VHS releases ==
#	VHS name	Release date	Episode story
1	Travels with a Duchess; The Fishing Line	11 October 1986	Includes: Travels with a Duchess & The Fishing Line.
2	Workhorses; Going Great Western	6 January 1987	Includes: Workhorses & Going Great Western. Despite a third volume being advertised on the end of the second release, it was never released.

== DVD releases ==
#	DVD name	Release date	Episode story
1	Legends of Steam: The Flying Scotsman	7 January 2004	Includes: A Tale of Two Scotsmen.

== See also ==
- The Train Now Departing
