= Ivo Peters =

Ivo Peters BEM (29 July 1915 – 7 June 1989) was an English railway photographer and filmmaker. Peters spent his life in Bath, Somerset and is best known for his amateur photographs and cine films of steam railways in the British Isles, particularly of the Somerset and Dorset Railway.

== Early life ==
Ivo Peters took his first railway photograph in 1925 at Mortehoe and Woolacombe railway station, and continued until 1934, when, while studying at the University of Cambridge, his interest was diverted to road racing in Ireland with a chain drive Frazer Nash car. In World War II, and for many years afterwards, he served in the Royal Observer Corps, for which he was awarded the British Empire Medal in 1958. He worked in the management of his family soap works.

== Railway photography ==
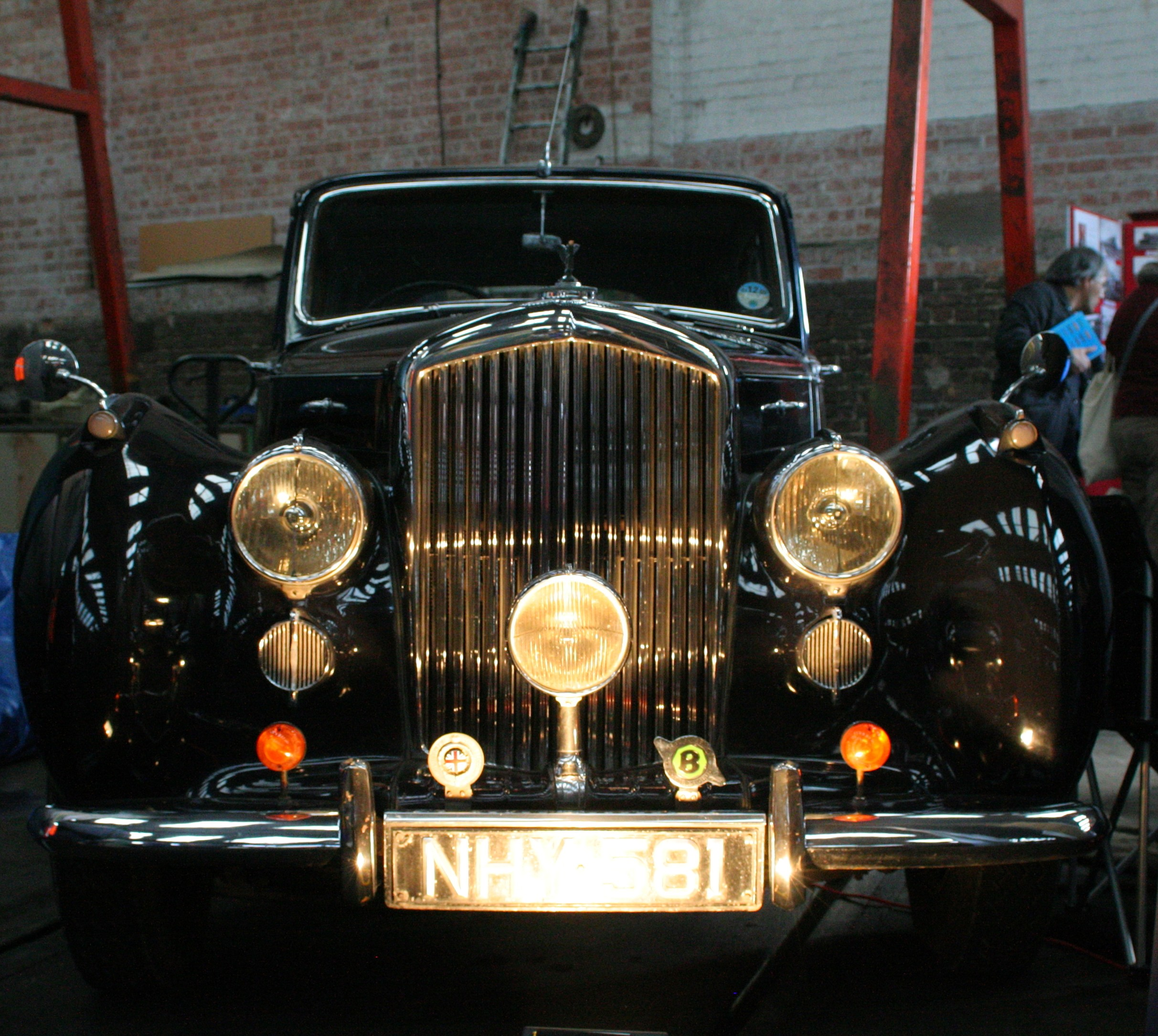
NHY581, Ivo's Bentley

In 1948 Ivo Peters returned to serious railway photography on the Somerset and Dorset Railway, and his 4.25 litre Mk.VI Bentley B31KL, registration NHY 581, soon became a regular lineside visitor whilst his photographs were published in Trains Illustrated and other magazines.

Although particularly associated with his "home line" of the S&D, Peters had other favourite photographic locations. These included Grayrigg to Tebay on the Lancaster and Carlisle Railway in the last years of steam; the Western Region of British Railways; the Southern Region West of England Main Line; British industrial narrow gauge railways, particularly the East Midlands ironstone and North Wales slate lines; steam locomotives of the National Coal Board; and the 3 feet (910 mm) gauge Isle of Man Railway and Tralee and Dingle Light Railway. On many photographic expeditions he was accompanied by his friend Norman Lockett.

His most characteristic railway photographs display the surrounding landscape to advantage. He said "I have to admit that the technical side of photography has never really 'bitten' me... For me, one of the greatest pleasures of railway photography has been when I have discovered some enchanting new location, and then set about trying to get the most attractive picture of the scene."

From 1959 his black-and-white photography was supplemented by colour 16mm cine film, around 25,000 ft (7,600 m) being exposed on railway subjects (and as much again on aircraft). Some of the railway material was much later broadcast on BBC Television and transferred to VHS and DVD by Railscene as "The Ivo Peters Collection". His still photography in colour was confined to the diesel era, and is represented in his book Railway Elegance.

== Last years ==
In 1980 Peters was diagnosed with spinal cancer which curtailed activities for the last decade of his life. He died in 1989 and his ashes were scattered at Masbury Summit on the Somerset and Dorset line, whilst there is a street in Bath named after him: this road leads across a formerly-operational railway bridge to Green Park Station, the terminus of his beloved Somerset and Dorset Railway.

== Publications ==
=== Collections of photographs by Ivo Peters ===
- Ivo Peters' Classic Steam, compiled by Mac Hawkins. David & Charles, 1996. ISBN 0-7153-0490-9
- Ivo Peters' Farewell to North-West steam: a photographer's salute to the last days of steam over Shap and on the Settle & Carlisle, edited by Mac Hawkins. David & Charles, 1992. ISBN 0-7153-0080-6
- Ivo Peters' Southern Steam Album. Ian Allan, 1979. ISBN 0-7110-0912-0
- Jinty. Somerset & Dorset Railway Museum Trust, 1976. (for young people)
- The Narrow Gauge Charm of Yesterday. Oxford Publishing Co., 1976. ISBN 0-902888-65-X
- Railway Elegance: Western Region trains in the English Countryside. Oxford Publishing Co., 1985. ISBN 0-7137-1479-4
- The Somerset & Dorset: an English cross-country railway. Oxford Publishing Co., 1974. ISBN 0-902888-33-1
- The Somerset and Dorset in the 'fifties. Oxford Publishing Co. Part 1, 1950–1954. 1980. ISBN 0-86093-101-3. Part 2, 1955–1959. 1981. ISBN 0-86093-103-X
- The Somerset and Dorset in the 'sixties. Oxford Publishing Co. Part 3, 1960–1962. 1982. ISBN 0-86093-160-9. Part 4, 1963–1966. 1981. ISBN 0-86093-161-7
- Somewhere along the line: fifty years love of trains. Oxford Publishing Co., 1976. ISBN 0-902888-80-3
- Steam around Bath, with Mike Arlett. Millstream Books, 1987. ISBN 0-948975-07-5

Several of the above have been reissued in new editions.

=== Other works with significant photographic content by Ivo Peters ===
- Robin Atthill, The picture history of the Somerset & Dorset Railway. David & Charles, 1970. ISBN 0-7153-4933-3
- The Golden Age of Steam. Western Daily Press, 1980.
- P.W. Smith, Mendips Engineman. Oxford Publishing Co., 1972. ISBN 0-902888-15-3
- F.E. Stickley, Somerset & Dorset engineman. Oakwood Press, 1979.
- The Train Now Departing. BBC, 1988. ISBN 0-563-20696-9
