= Ilfracombe branch line =

Railway in Devon, England, connecting Barnstaple to Ilfracombe

Overview
- Status: closed, parts converted to bicycle paths
- Locale: North Devon, England
- Termini: Barnstaple Junction; Ilfracombe
- Stations: 7

Service
- Type: branch line
- System: London & South Western Railway

History
- Opened: 20 July 1874
- Closed: 5 October 1970

The North Devon Railway connected Barnstaple to the growing railway network in 1854 and as Ilfracombe developed as a watering place, it was obvious a railway connection to the town was needed. The hilly terrain was very difficult, but an Ilfracombe Railway was authorised in 1864 but failed when a major shareholder was unable to respond to a subscription call. After several false starts the Barnstaple and Ilfracombe Railway, soon taken over by the London and South Western Railway, opened in 1870.

The gradients on the line were exceptionally difficult and train loads were curtailed accordingly, although in the twentieth century, extensive use of assisting engines enabled ten-coach trains to be operated at the busiest summer Saturdays. The Great Western Railway made a connection from Taunton to a separate station in Barnstaple in 1873 through an associated company, the Devon and Somerset Railway. The two lines at Barnstaple were connected in 1887, and some GWR trains ran through, or passed through coaches on to LSWR trains. From 1947 to 1954 an express train named the Devon Belle operated; it was a limited stop train service from London to Ilfracombe and back, using observation cars. (Note: In the UK an observation car was an ordinary coach with a large area of glazing at one end; it was run as the last vehicle in a train, and enabled passengers to view the landscape behind the train.)

In the 1950s holiday travel to Ilfracombe by rail declined steeply as road travel took over; outside the peak holiday times local usage was very limited and the line was closed in 1970.

== Early proposals ==
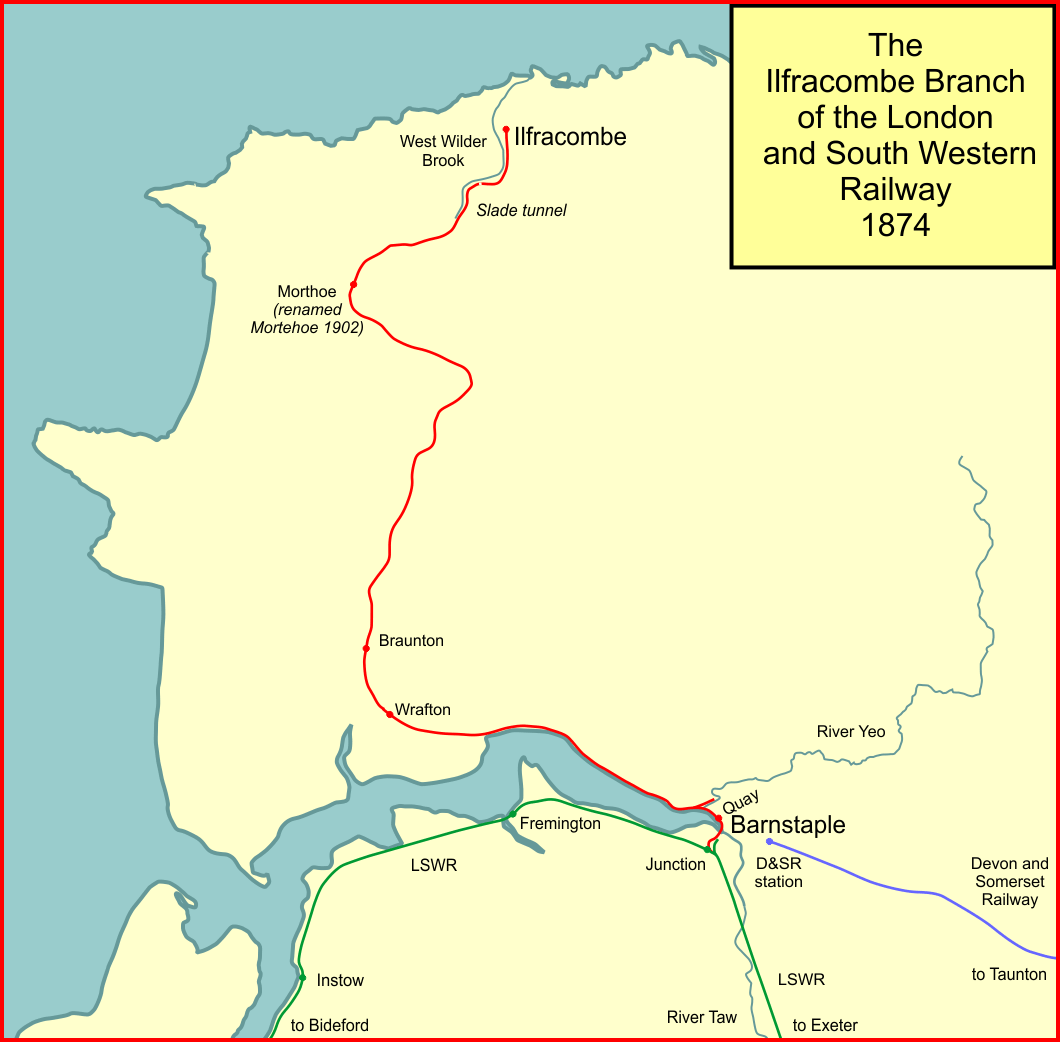
Ilfracombe railway in 1874

Ilfracombe began to be recognised as a watering place from the 1830s, and in following decades its attraction became more widely known and visitor numbers increased considerably. Access was difficult as the roads approaching the town were steep and inconvenient, and most visitors arrived by steamer, from Bristol and elsewhere.

The North Devon Railway and Docks Company opened its line from Crediton to Barnstaple in 1854. It was a single broad gauge line at first, but after certain dubious procedures, it was taken over (on lease) by the London and South Western Railway, making a railway connection to the national network. The track was soon converted to mixed gauge, to enable the operation of narrow (standard) gauge trains.

== The Ilfracombe Railway proposed ==
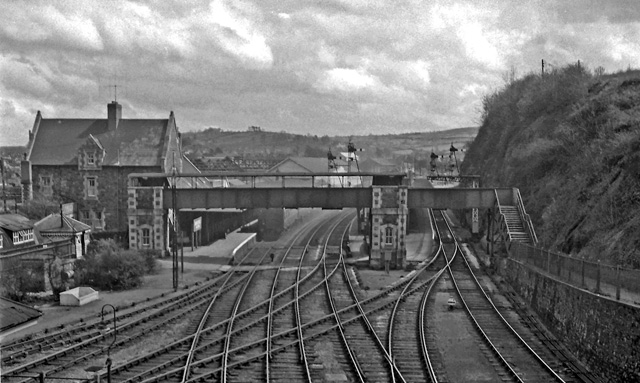
Barnstaple Junction station in 1964, looking towards Exeter from the road bridge. The tracks entering from the left mark the southern end of the Ilfracombe branch; those in the foreground lead to Bideford.

An Exeter solicitor, Thomas Wreford, was active in promoting the idea of a railway connecting Barnstaple and Ilfracombe, but after considerable effort and expenditure was unable to get sufficient support. Wreford's work was reopened when J. E. Errington, consulting engineer to the LSWR, examined possible routes, probably in 1861. The terrain was difficult, with a ridge rising to 800 feet above sea level barring the way. Errington favoured a western route through Braunton, but there was opposition from an absentee landowner, Sir William Williams, and misjudgements elsewhere by Wreford weakened confidence in the scheme, and it was not carried forward.

In 1861 a slightly altered route was decided upon, and the LSWR was approached for support. It had not yet established its ability to reach Barnstaple, and it indicated that negotiations with the North Devon company for its acquisition were dominating its attention at the time. In July 1862 the LSWR finalised its talks with the North Devon company, and the LSWR acquired that line outright on 1 January 1865. Now that it had certainty of its narrow (standard) gauge access to Barnstaple, it indicated that it was prepared to consider an Ilfracombe line. The proposed Braunton route to Ilfracombe had steep gradients and sharp curves, and the LSWR arranged for a new survey of an alternative, eastern route. When the survey was complete it was obvious that this route was much more expensive due to the heavy engineering works that would be necessary, so the Braunton route was settled on, and working arrangements whereby the LSWR would work the line for 45% of gross receipts were agreed.

A parliamentary bill for the Ilfracombe Railway went to Parliament in the 1863 session, but it was opposed by Sir William Williams, and an engineer Sir John Fowler spoke against the safety aspect of the Braunton route, and asserted that the eastern route would be cheaper. Fowler was a consulting engineer to the Great Western Railway and accordingly had some personal authority. The bill was thrown out.

When the bad news was brought to Braunton and Ilfracombe, violent disquiet was in evidence, and the Riot Act was read at 02:00 on Sunday 26 April. The water was further muddied by the revival now of an earlier scheme for a Devon and Somerset Railway, affiliated to the Great Western Railway, connecting Taunton to Ilfracombe through Barnstaple.

The Ilfracombe Railway promoters decided on a further attempt to get an act of Parliament, in the 1864 session of Parliament. To fend off the possibility of the Devon and Somerset Railway getting authorisation for its line to Ilfracombe instead of the Ilfracombe Railway, the promoters of the IR decided to propose the eastern route themselves, knowing it to be inferior.

== Ilfracombe Railway authorised; and the Devon and Somerset Railway too ==
Ilfracombe Railway Act 1864 (Note: Section 1.)
- Act of Parliament
- Parliament of the United Kingdom
- Long title: An Act for the Incorporation of "The Ilfracombe Railway Company," and the making and maintaining of "The Ilfracombe Railway;" and for other Purposes.
- Citation: 27 & 28 Vict. c. cclxxii
- Territorial extent: United Kingdom

Dates
- Royal assent: 25 July 1864
- Commencement: 25 July 1864 (Note: The Acts of Parliament (Commencement) Act 1793.)

Other legislation
- Amended by: Devon and Somerset Railway (Ilfracombe) Act 1867

Status: Amended

Text of statute as originally enacted

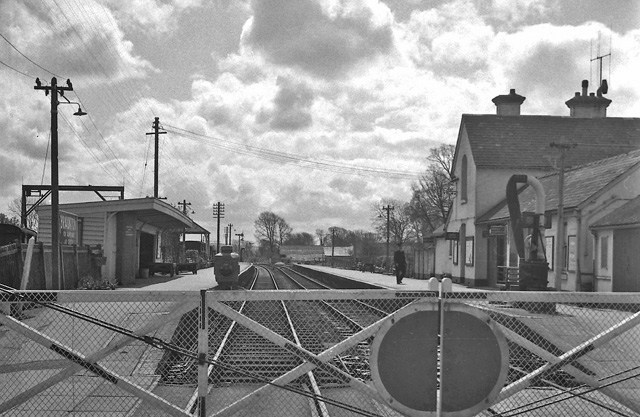
Braunton railway station in 1964

The Ilfracombe Railway was accordingly authorised by the Ilfracombe Railway Act 1864 (27 & 28 Vict. c. cclxxii) of 25 July 1864.

Ilfracombe Railway Act 1865
- Act of Parliament
- Parliament of the United Kingdom
- Long title: An Act for authorizing the Acquisition by the London and South-western Railway Company and the Devon and Somerset Railway Company of the Undertaking and Property of the Ilfracombe Railway Company; and for other Purposes.
- Citation: 28 & 29 Vict. c. lxxi
- Territorial extent: United Kingdom

Dates
- Royal assent: 2 June 1865
- Commencement: 2 June 1865

Other legislation
- Amended by: Devon and Somerset Railway (Ilfracombe) Act 1867

Status: Amended

The rival Devon and Somerset Railway (D&SR) was authorised in the same session, on 29 July 1864, but only between Taunton and Barnstaple. Parliament required the Ilfracombe Railway to build all bridges and structures in such a way that broad gauge trains off the D&SR might pass over the line. Share capital of the Ilfracombe Railway was to be £210,000 and the D&SR were permitted to be major subscribers for shares. The Ilfracombe Railway Act 1865 (28 & 29 Vict. c. lxxi) of 2 July 1865 reincorporated the company with the LSWR and the D&SR being the only shareholders, save for 77 shares out of 5,250.

The Ilfracombe Railway Company now made a call of £2 per share towards land acquisition and construction, but the D&SR found itself unable to raise money to pay its call. From the point of view of the Great Western Railway, "the chance of extending the broad gauge to Ilfracombe was missed".

This impasse dragged on for a very considerable time, with the IR eventually taking legal action against the D&SR. Although judgment in court was given against the D&SR in the sum of £11,492, the Ilfracombe Railway was unable to proceed with construction as it had no funds, and in fact it was not until 26 July 1901 when the Great Western Railway absorbed the D&SR that the debt was paid, and the impotent Ilfracombe Railway Company was able to be dissolved.

Devon and Somerset Railway (Ilfracombe) Act 1867
- Act of Parliament
- Parliament of the United Kingdom
- Long title: An Act for the Repeal of certain Provisions of "The Ilfracombe Railway Act, 1864," and of "The Ilfracombe Railway Act, 1865," and for other Purposes.
- Citation: 30 & 31 Vict. c. clxxii
- Territorial extent: United Kingdom

Dates
- Royal assent: 12 August 1867
- Commencement: 12 August 1867

Other legislation
- Amends: Ilfracombe Railway Act 1864; Ilfracombe Railway Act 1865

Status: Current legislation

Text of statute as originally enacted

Ilfracombe Railway (Abandonment) Act 1868
- Act of Parliament
- Parliament of the United Kingdom
- Long title: An Act for the Abandonment of the Undertaking of the Ilfracombe Railway Company, and for the Dissolution of that Company; and for other Purposes.
- Citation: 31 & 32 Vict. c. lxxi
- Territorial extent: United Kingdom

Dates
- Royal assent: 25 June 1868
- Commencement: 25 June 1868
- Repealed: 31 January 2013

Other legislation
- Repealed by: Statute Law (Repeals) Act 2013

Status: Repealed

Text of statute as originally enacted

At the end of 1867 the Ilfracombe Railway Company had decided not to proceed with construction, even though £46,370 had been expended without any construction taking place. The authorised but unbuilt Ilfracombe Railway was abandoned by the Ilfracombe Railway (Abandonment) Act 1868 (31 & 32 Vict. c. lxxi) of 25 July 1868.

== The Barnstaple and Ilfracombe Railway ==
=== Promotion ===
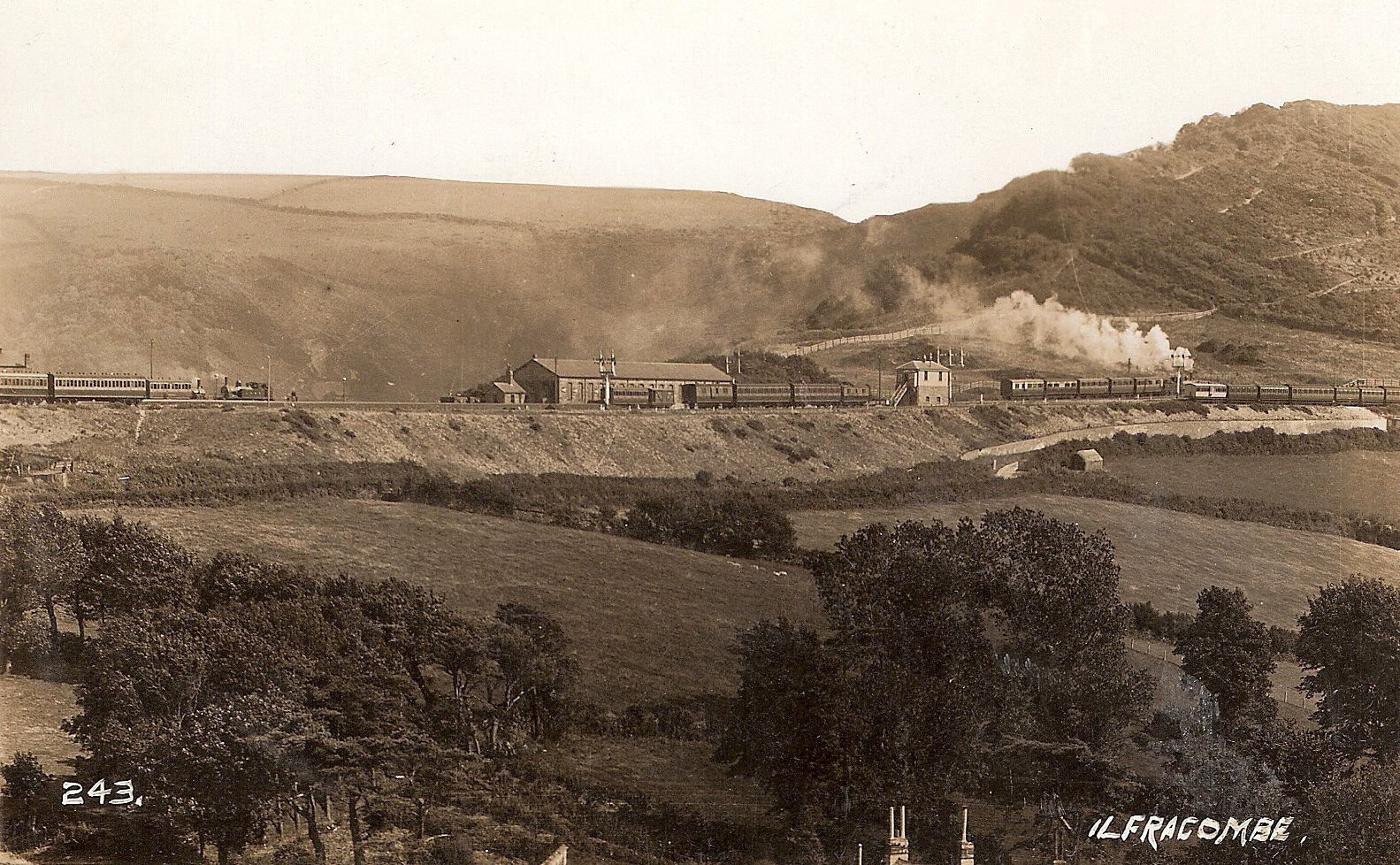
Ilfracombe railway station about 1900

In 1869 pressure mounted further for a line, this time under the aegis of the LSWR; but still the question of the route to be adopted was controversial; this included the choice of how the line would join the existing North Devon line, and where it would cross the river. The western route via Braunton was eventually seen to the better option and in the 1870 session of Parliament the Barnstaple and Ilfracombe Railway's bill was considered. There was much opposition, including from residents near the proposed northern route, who would now not have a railway nearby. Nevertheless, the Braunton route was selected, and the River Taw was to be crossed directly by a long bridge at Barnstaple itself.

The LSWR had noted that the Regulation of Railways Act 1868 authorised the approval of light railways, and proposed that the Ilfracombe line be built as such. The configuration of a light railway was vague, and section 28 of the act merely specified:

A light Railway shall be constructed and worked subject to such Conditions and Regulations as the Board of Trade may from Time to Time impose or make: Provided, that
(1) the Regulations respecting the Weight of Locomotive Engines, Carriages, and Vehicles to be used on such Railway shall not authorize a greater Weight than Eight Tons to be brought upon the Rails by any One Pair of Wheels;
(2) the Regulations respecting the Speed of Trains shall not authorise a Rate of Speed exceeding at any Time Twenty-five Miles an Hour. — Regulation of Railways Act 1868, Section 28

Barnstaple and Ilfracombe Railway Act 1870
- Act of Parliament
- Parliament of the United Kingdom
- Long title: An Act for making railways from Barnstaple to Ilfracombe; and for other purposes.
- Citation: 33 & 34 Vict. c. cx
- Territorial extent: United Kingdom

Dates
- Royal assent: 4 July 1870
- Commencement: 4 July 1870

Status: Current legislation

Text of statute as originally enacted

The Barnstaple and Ilfracombe Railway got its authorising act of Parliament as a light railway, the Barnstaple and Ilfracombe Railway Act 1870 (33 & 34 Vict. c. cx) on 4 July 1870, with share capital of £105,000. At first the take-up of share subscriptions locally was extremely slow, and the LSWR had to relax some of its financial conditions for working the line to encourage investors.

The railways hereinbefore referred to and authorised by this Act are,—

1st. A railway (No. 1) one mile and one furlong in length, commencing in the parish of Tawstock in the county of Devon by a junction with the South-western Railway, and terminating in Pottington Marsh in the parish of Pilton in the same county;
2ndly. A railway (No. 2) thirteen miles and five furlongs in length, commencing by a junction with railway No. 1 at its termination, and terminating in the parish of Ilfracombe in the same county. — Barnstaple and Ilfracombe Railway Act 1870 (33 & 34 Vict. c. cx), Section 5

This was successful and construction continued, and on 13 July 1874 Col. C. S. Hutchinson (Note: Later Major-General Hutchinson.) carried out an inspection of the line for the Board of Trade. He observed that the River Taw was crossed by a curving viaduct of 17 spans on a 7.5 chain curve there was next a swing bridge over the River Yeo. The line passed its inspection.

=== Opening of the line ===
The line opened to the public on 20 July 1874.

At first the passenger train service was five down and four up trains daily except Sundays, between Barnstaple Junction and Ilfracombe. By August 1880 there were six trains in each direction; the journey time was less than 50 minutes. In fact the Devon and Somerset Railway had opened its line between Taunton (actually Norton Fitzwarren) and its own Barnstaple station on 1 November 1873; affiliated to the Great Western Railway it had a shorter route to London, via Bristol, and operated a coach service from its Barnstaple station to Ilfracombe. It did not yet make a physical connection to the LSWR affiliated lines.

== Acquisition by the LSWR, and improvements ==
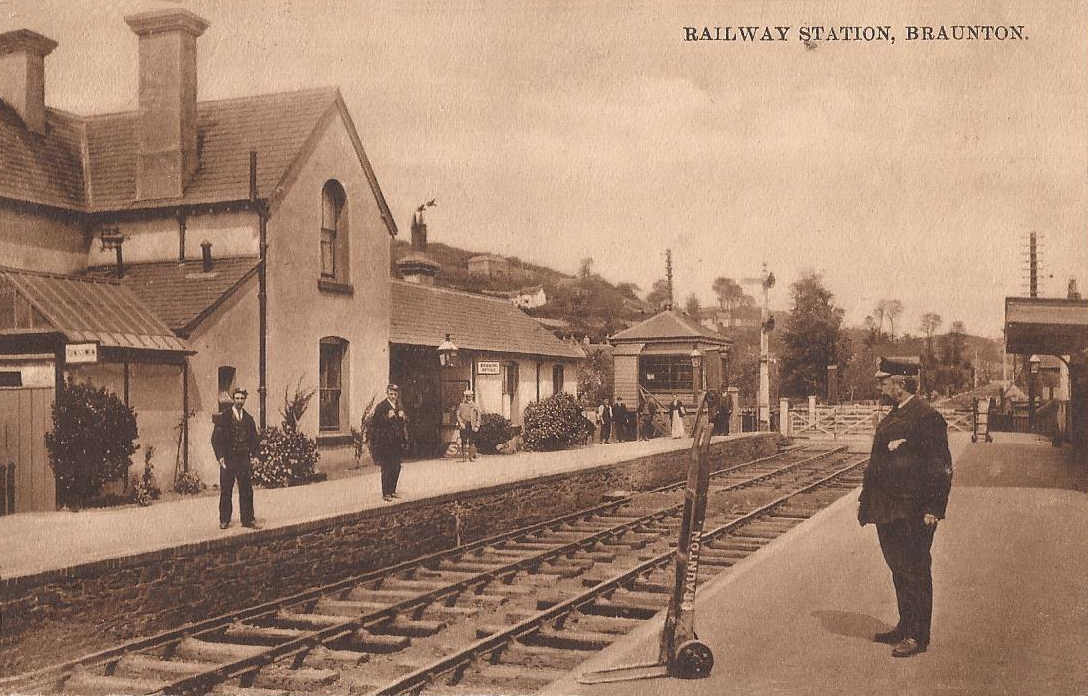
Braunton station in the early twentieth century

In 1875 the Barnstaple and Ilfracombe Railway was amalgamated with the LSWR, following authorisation in the South Western Railway (General) Act 1874 (37 & 38 Vict. c. cxliii) of 16 July 1874.

In 1887 the status of the line as a light railway was altered to normal operation. It was decided to double the line, except for the section from Barnstaple Junction to Pottington, because of the expense of doubling the Taw viaduct and the Yeo swing bridge. When the line was originally built, the single line was laid in the centre of the double track formation, and the doubling was carried out by the acquisition of additional land. The line between Braunton and Mortehoe was commissioned as a double line on 1 July 1889, followed by Braunton to Pottington on 4 August 1890. Finally Mortehoe to Ilfracombe was opened as double track on 1 July 1891.

Ilfracombe station was 225 feet above sea level. As holiday peak traffic developed, Ilfracombe station was successively extended and improved, in 1901, 1917 and 1929.

== Devon and Somerset Railway ==
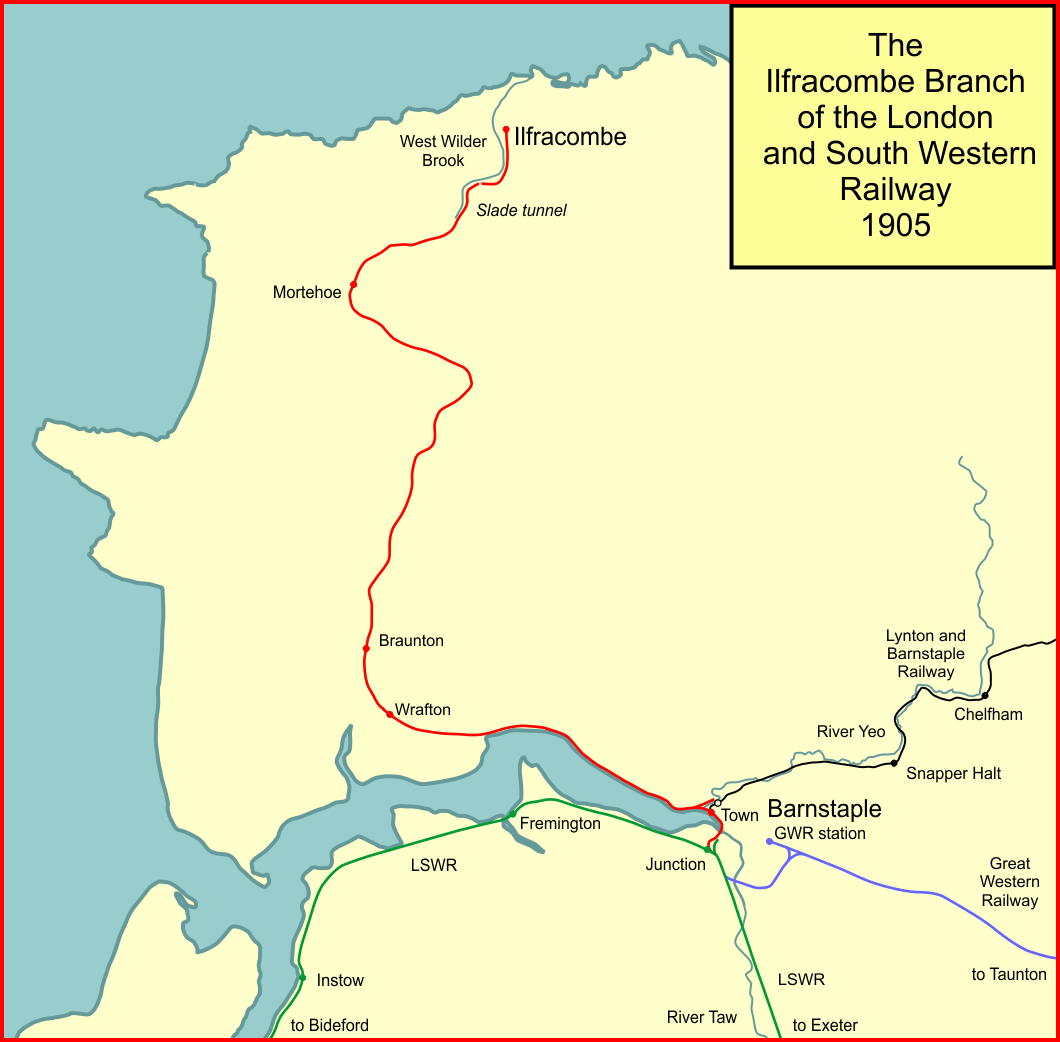
Ilfracombe railway line in 1905

On 1 November 1873 the Devon and Somerset Railway had opened its line throughout from Taunton to its own Barnstaple station; a coach connection was operated to Ilfracombe. At this time the D&SR was a broad gauge railway, but it was converted to narrow (standard) gauge on 18 May 1881.

On 1 June 1887 the D&SR opened a connecting loop from its Barnstaple station to Barnstaple Junction station, and trains could run through, albeit with a reversal. Through GWR trains from Taunton over the Devon and Somerset line operated; it was stipulated by the LSWR that only through journeys to Ilfracombe were permitted on the line; journeys to other LSWR stations had to be made using the D&SR terminus and road transfer to Barnstaple Junction or Town stations.

An eastern arm of the D&SR triangle was opened on 1 July 1905 permitting through running from Taunton to Barnstaple Junction without reversal in Victoria Road. The GWR station was named Victoria Road in 1949.

== Train services ==
=== Nineteenth century ===
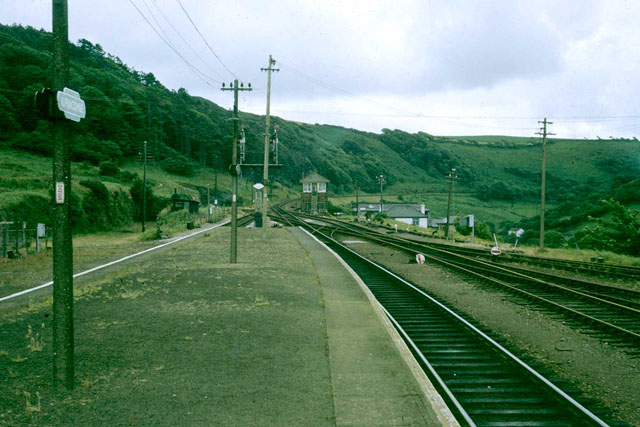
Ilfracombe station approaches in August 1969

The Great Western Railway took a great interest in the Ilfracombe service; from July 1889 a train named "The Ilfracombe Express" ran from Paddington to Ilfracombe in 6 hours 55 minutes, while through coaches of the GWR train named Zulu did the journey in 6 hours 2 minutes, faster than the LSWR transit from Waterloo, which was 6 hours 22 minutes.

A "Liverpool Express" ran to Ilfracombe and the Midland Railway ran a train from Bradford via Bath and Templecombe, partly over the Somerset and Dorset Joint Railway. Sunday journeys on the Ilfracombe line were started on 1 June 1890. By the summer of 1905 the service had much improved, with thirteen down trains and fifteen up trains, including a luncheon car corridor express to and from Waterloo; the up train made the journey in 5 hours 15 minutes.

A pooling agreement was concluded for the London traffic in May 1910.

Before the First World War the Torbay Express slipped a portion for Ilfracombe at Taunton; the four coach slip included a restaurant car, the only occasion when a restaurant car was slipped. The portion was attached to a stopping train over the Devon and Somerset line to Barnstaple and was attached to an LSWR train to Ilfracombe.

In the 1930s and then immediately after 1945 holiday traffic took on an even more important role, and through trains were run to and from London (both Waterloo and Paddington) and numerous other destinations.

=== The Ilfracombe Boat Express ===
The popularity of Ilfracombe as a holiday destination was such that the Barry Railway operated an Ilfracombe Boat Express from Cardiff Riverside to Barry Pier, between 1905 and 1909 in summer only, at 09:35 from Cardiff to connect with a 10:10 steamer sailing from Barry to Ilfracombe. For residents of Cardiff and south east Wales this was a competitive means of reaching Ilfracombe as compared with the rail transit via Bristol.

=== The Atlantic Coast Express ===
From 10 July 1926 the Atlantic Coast Express started to be run, with multiple portions. At Barnstaple Junction a through coach from Paddington that had been slipped at Taunton, was attached. The Atlantic Coast Express ceased to run after 5 September 1964.

=== The Devon Belle ===
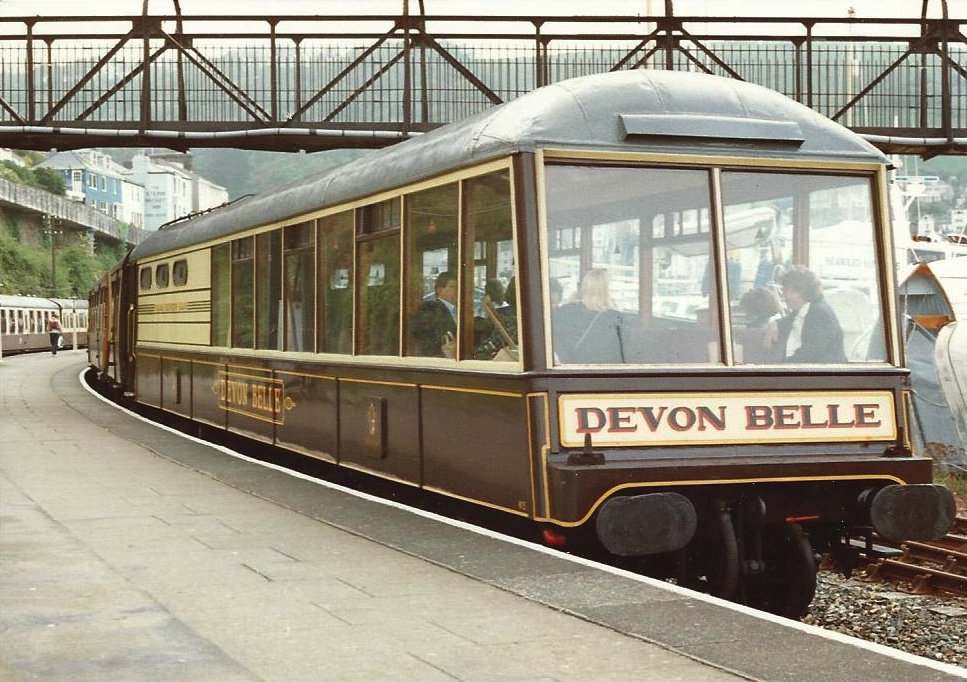
Devon Belle observation car in later use at Kingswear in May 2013

From 20 June 1947 the Devon Belle was run, with four coaches for Plymouth and eight for Ilfracombe, occasionally strengthened to ten. The train changed engines at Wilton, not a passenger stop, and divided at Exeter Central. The Wilton stop was necessitated by tender capacity; at the time there was consideration of providing a larger tender to avoid the stop, but this was not acted upon. The Ilfracombe portion then called at Barnstaple Town, Braunton and Mortehoe and Ilfracombe. At first the train ran Fridays to Mondays only (down Friday to Sunday, up Saturday to Monday) but this was extended to Thursday to Tuesday in the summer of 1949; in both cases it ran in the summer season only. The up trains often had a Bulleid pacific assisting in rear as well as a pacific as the train engine to climb out of Ilfracombe.

The two observation cars for the Devon Belle were converted from existing Pullman cars by the Pullman Company at Brighton. The observation cars were turned on the locomotive turntable at Ilfracombe and in London. They were the only observation cars ever run on the Southern Railway and its British Railways Southern Region successor. The signwriting on the rear read "Devon Belle" although the locomotive headboard read “The Devon Belle” until it was changed to omit the definite article in what proved to be its final year of operation. In the 1950s patronage declined and the train was discontinued at the end of the 1954 season.

The final day of regular steam working was 5 September 1964, from which time most ordinary trains were operated by diesel multiple units, although on summer Saturdays diesel locomotive hauled through trains operated in addition. The dmu services ran to destinations local to Exeter, including Exmouth and Honiton, and later Paignton.

== Locomotives ==
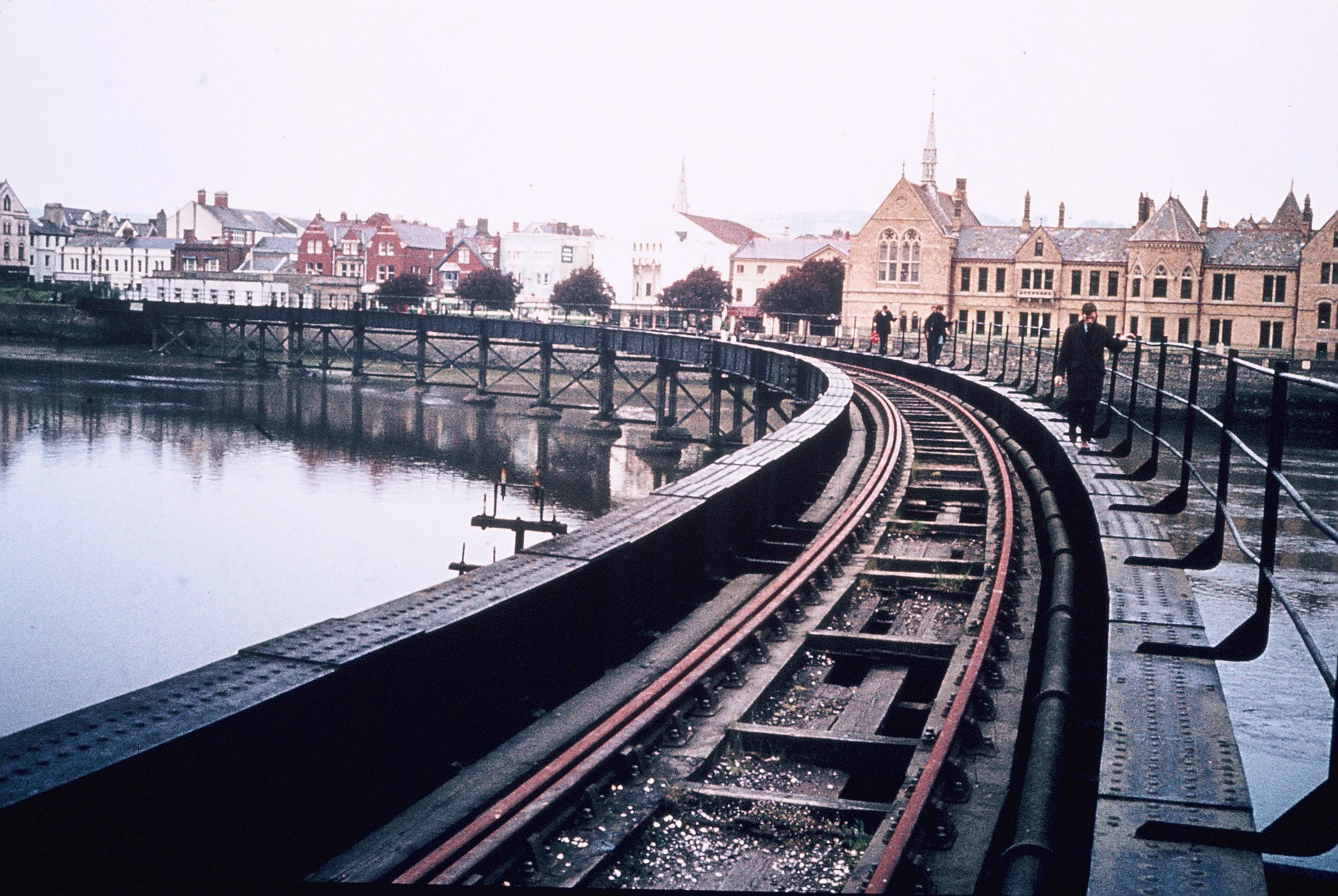
Barnstaple railway bridge in the 1970s

As a light railway, axle weights on the Ilfracombe line were limited, while the gradients were formidable. In 1873, three locomotives were delivered from Beyer, Peacock and Company; they were 0-6-0 tender engines, and they were known as Ilfracombe Goods engines. They were restricted to four passenger vehicles with two brake vans, and on goods trains to eight wagons and a van.

From the first years of the twentieth century they were replaced by Adams T1 0-4-4 tank engines, and from about 1914 the M7 class of 0-4-4 tank engines were brought into use. In the summer of 1925 the N class of moguls were first used on the line; on 3 March 1925 one of the class took 7 coaches from Exeter to Ilfracombe, but it nearly stalled on Braunton bank. Comparative runs showed that the M7 locomotives were better suited to work the branch, although for through journeys to Exeter the N class was more suited. The more modern King Arthur, Schools and Lord Nelson classes were too heavy for use on the line, but the air-smoothed West Country pacifics, introduced from 1945, were allowed and could handle heavier loads. They were often used to assist the N class engines on heavy trains.

When some of the West Country class were later modified to a more conventional technical specification later, the added weight resulted in the affected locomotives being too heavy for the line and unable to be used there.

After nationalisation, Ivatt 2-6-2 tank engines of the former London, Midland and Scottish Railway were employed as the old M7 class were phased out.

== Decline ==
Although summer weekend holiday traffic was extremely busy, the branch was very little used outside those times and financial losses were built up. Goods services were withdrawn on 7 September 1964. The line was singled on 17 December 1967. Road-based competition – motor coaches and private cars – accelerated the decline in usage of the line, and the train service was discontinued on 5 October 1970.

== Topography ==
=== Gradients ===
Gradients on the northern part of the line were severe; down trains started to climb in earnest from Braunton station and faced six miles of ascent, stiffening to 1 in 40 to the summit at Mortehoe station. Up trains experienced a climb right from the buffer stops at Ilfracombe station, and the ascent was at 1 in 36 for three miles to Mortehoe with only a slight slackening for the last three quarters of a mile. All but the lightest trains were assisted by banking engines, and on summer Saturdays there were several occasions when up and down trains passed at Mortehoe, both trains being assisted and requiring the banking engines were return downhill to their respective positions for the next duty.

=== Locations ===
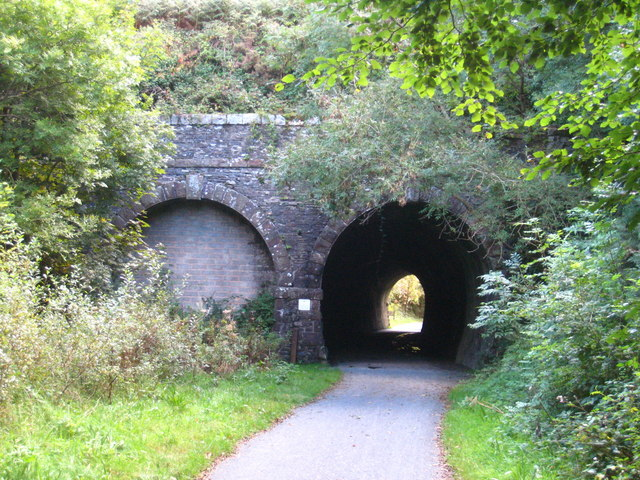
The western end of Slade tunnels in September 2010 after closure

- Barnstaple Junction; North Devon Railway station, opened 1 August 1854; renamed Barnstaple Junction 1874; renamed Barnstaple 1970 ;still open;
- Barnstaple Quay; opened 20 July 1874; renamed Barnstaple Town 1886 then relocated 11 chains west to accommodate Lynton & Barnstaple Railway 16 May 1898; closed 5 October 1970;
- Pottington signal box; end of single line section from Barnstaple Junction;
- Wrafton; opened 20 July 1874; closed 5 October 1970;
- Braunton; opened 20 July 1874; closed 5 October 1970;
- Morthoe; opened 20 July 1874; renamed Mortehoe 13 May 1902; renamed Mortehoe and Woolacombe 5 June 1950; closed 5 October 1970;
- Slade Tunnel;
- Ilfracombe; opened 20 July 1874; closed 5 October 1970.

== After closure ==
The trackbed between Mortehoe Station and Ilfracombe has been restored as the Devon Coast to Coast Cycle Route and forms part of the Tarka Trail. It is possible to walk or cycle from the north road bridge parapet by Mortehoe Station to Ilfracombe.
