= Barnstaple Quay railway station =

Former railway station in Devon, England

Coordinates: 51.08016°N 4.06421°W

Barnstaple Quay
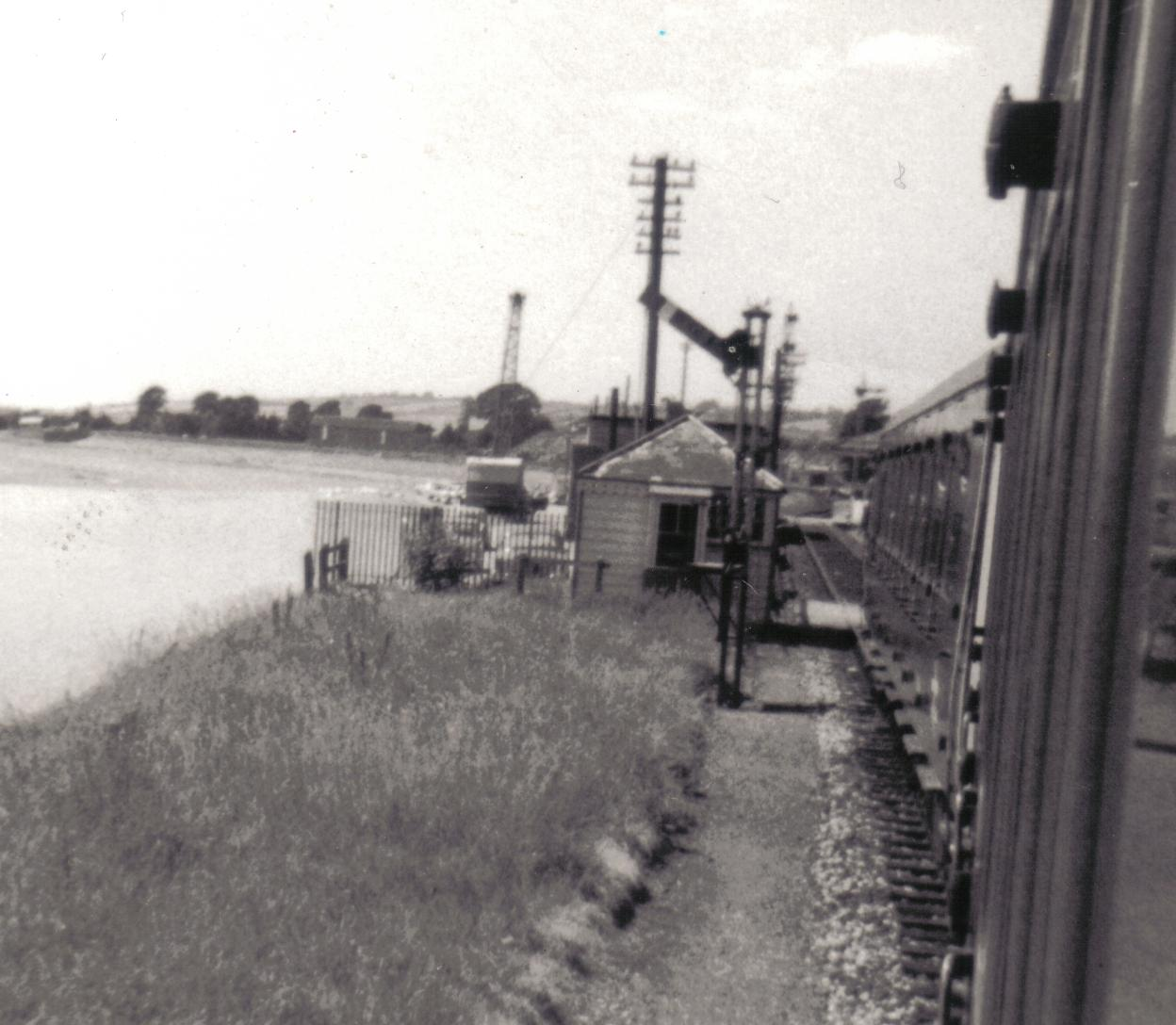
- Near the site of Barnstaple Quay station on 5 July 1969 looking towards Ilfracombe

General information
- Location: Barnstaple, Devon; England
- Platforms: 1

Other information
- Status: Disused

History
- Original company: London and South Western Railway
- Pre-grouping: London and South Western Railway

Key dates
- 20 July 1874: Opened as Barnstaple Quay
- July 1886: Name changed to Barnstaple Town
- 16 May 1898: Resited
Location

Barnstaple Quay was an intermediate station on the L&SWR line to Ilfracombe in Devon, England. The station opened in 1874, and located on the north bank of the River Taw close to the centre of Barnstaple, was renamed Barnstaple Town in 1886. With the opening of the Lynton and Barnstaple Railway in 1898, the station was relocated to its present site, to accommodate passenger exchange to the narrow gauge line. The station became the town's bus station, but this closed in 1999 and the building then became a café when a new and larger bus station was opened closer to the town centre.

== See also ==
- Ilfracombe Branch Line
