= Mortehoe and Woolacombe railway station =

Former railway station in North Devon, England

Coordinates: 51.173232°N 4.169598°W

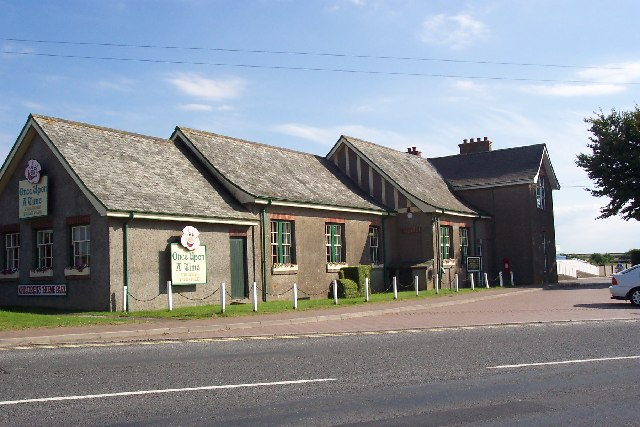
The old station building, when it housed the theme park "Once Upon a Time" in September 2003

Mortehoe and Woolacombe railway station was a station on the London and South Western Railway Ilfracombe Branch Line between Barnstaple and Ilfracombe in North Devon, England (grid reference SS483438).

== History ==
The station was opened in 1874, with the line, and served the villages of Mortehoe and Woolacombe. It was known as Morthoe until 13 May 1902. The station was the location of eminent railway photographer Ivo Peters's first steam train photograph in 1925; and was immortalised in 1964 in the song Slow Train by Flanders and Swann. It was closed to passengers in October 1970 when the branch closed.

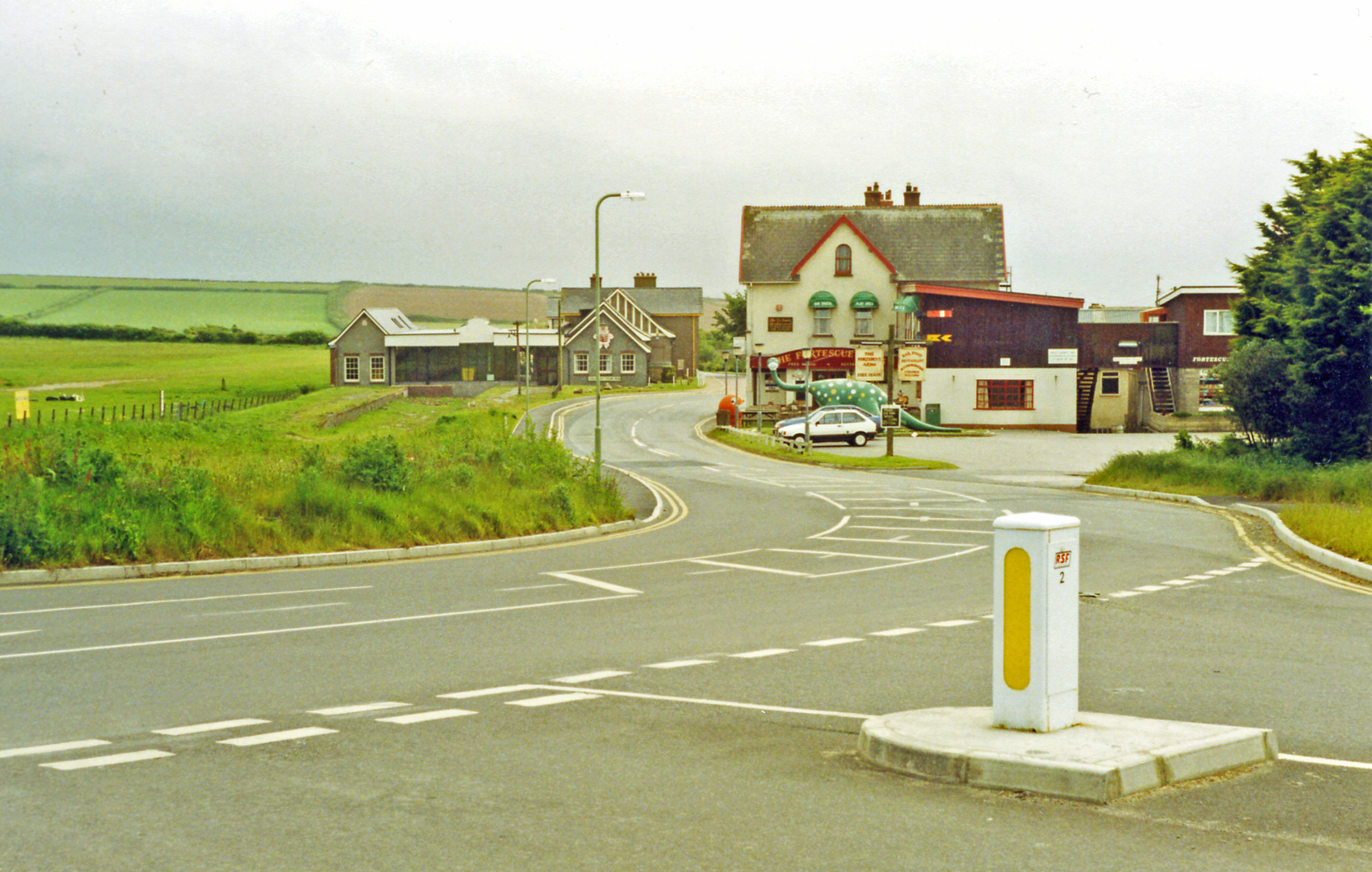
The station in June 1991

== "Once Upon a Time" ==
After lying semi-derelict for many years, in the early 1990s the station was used as the basis for a children's theme park called Once Upon a Time. Four redundant British Railways Mark 1 coaches were craned into position between the platforms, and a number of ex-BR 4-wheel vans (mostly 12-ton "Vanwide" type) were located around the grounds. The former rolling stock was used to contain fairytale animations, while the rest of the station and area around it were used to hold small children's rides. Although opened independently, the attraction was latterly owned by the operators of nearby Watermouth Castle. In 2004, the attraction was sold when the owner was approached by a housing developer. Although the first offer of £500,000 was refused, the developer put in a later offer of £800,000 which was accepted, and the attraction closed at the end of the 2005 season.

== Later development ==
In December 2006, a planning application was lodged for the redevelopment of the site. The plan covered the building of seven units of affordable housing, located in the area currently occupied by the platforms, and 37 units of ("temporary") holiday accommodation, the latter to be known as the Atlantic Lodge Holiday Park, and due to be available from 1 May 2009. The surviving station buildings, including the signal box, would be retained, converted to form a reception area, offices and shop for the holiday accommodation. The design of the houses was intended to be sympathetic to the station building, following the same roofline and using similar building materials. The Tarka Trail would continue to skirt the eastern edge of the site. The planning application consultation period was expected to be completed in April 2007.

By August 2007, all of the external amusement rides and constructions had been auctioned off or demolished, leaving just the main buildings and platforms intact.

By May 2013 the site had been largely completed, with a mixture of permanent and holiday homes. The builder's website showing the completed homes and plans for a third phase.

== Combe Rail ==
In late 2015 a charity named Combe Rail was formed with the intention of establishing a heritage railway on the trackbed of the Ilfracombe-Barnstaple line as well as lobbying for a full reopening in the future.

Preceding station	Disused railways	Following station
Braunton; Line and station closed	London and South Western Railway; Barnstaple and Ilfracombe Railway	Ilfracombe; Line and station closed
