= Barnstaple railway station =

Railway station in Devon, England

Barnstaple
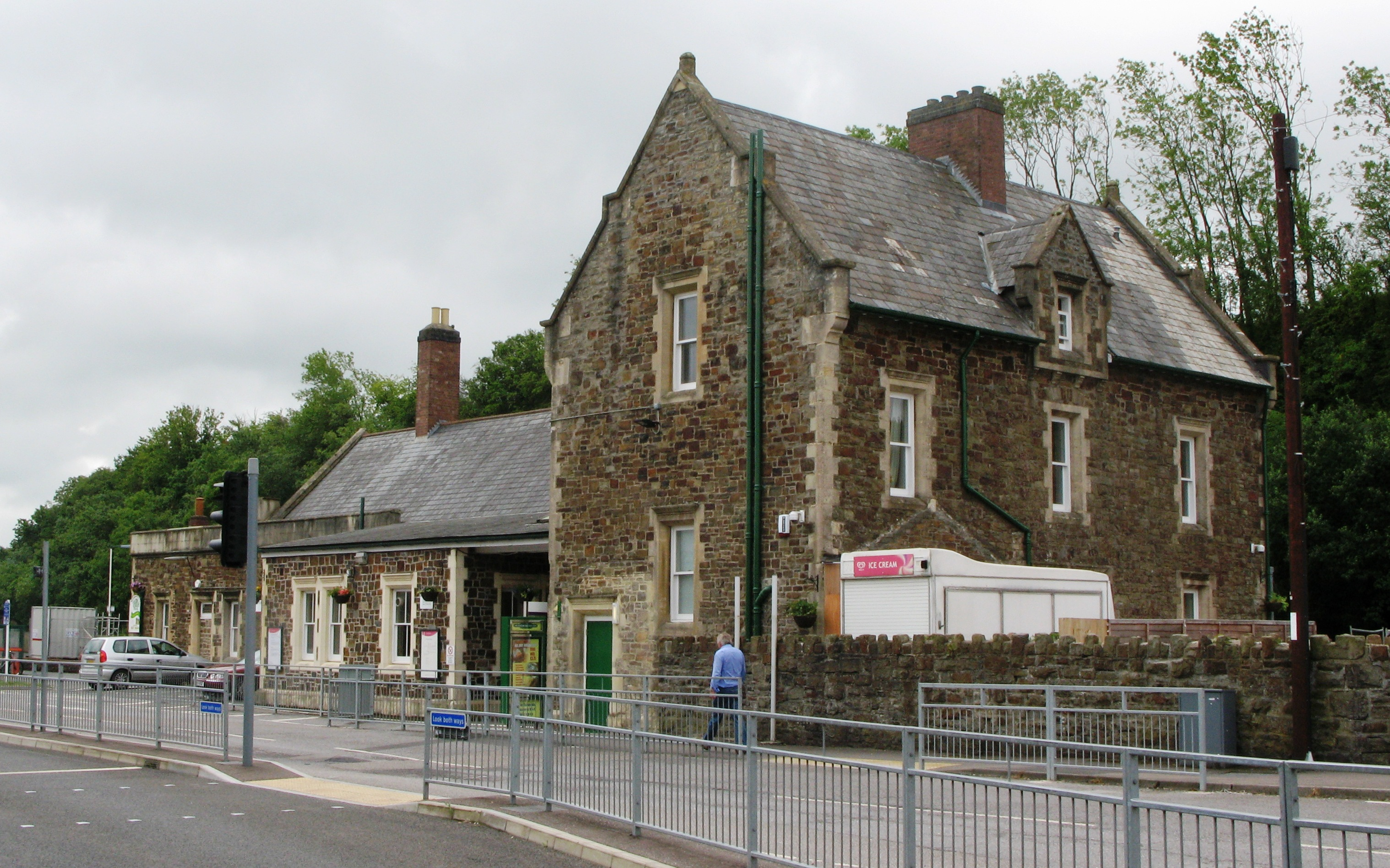

General information
- Location: Barnstaple, North Devon, Devon; England
- Coordinates: 51.0740°N 4.0636°W
- Grid reference: SS555325
- Manager: Great Western Railway
- Platforms: 1

Other information
- Station code: BNP
- Classification: DfT category E

History
- Original company: North Devon Railway
- Pre-grouping: London and South Western Railway
- Post-grouping: Southern Railway

Key dates
- 1854: Opened
- 1874: Renamed 'Barnstaple Junction'
- 1970: Reverted to 'Barnstaple'

Passengers
- 2020/21: ▼0.172 million
- 2021/22: ▲0.423 million
- 2022/23: ▲0.537 million
- 2023/24: ▲0.550 million
- 2024/25: ▲0.609 million
Location
Notes
- Passenger statistics from the Office of Rail and Road

Barnstaple railway station is the northern terminus of the Tarka Line and serves the town of Barnstaple, Devon. It is 39 miles 75 chains (64.3 km) from Exeter Central and 211.25 miles (339.97 km) from London Waterloo. It is managed by Great Western Railway, which also operates the passenger service.

It opened in 1854 but, from 1874 until 1970, it was known as Barnstaple Junction railway station, as it was the junction between lines to Ilfracombe, Bideford, Taunton and Exeter.

== History ==
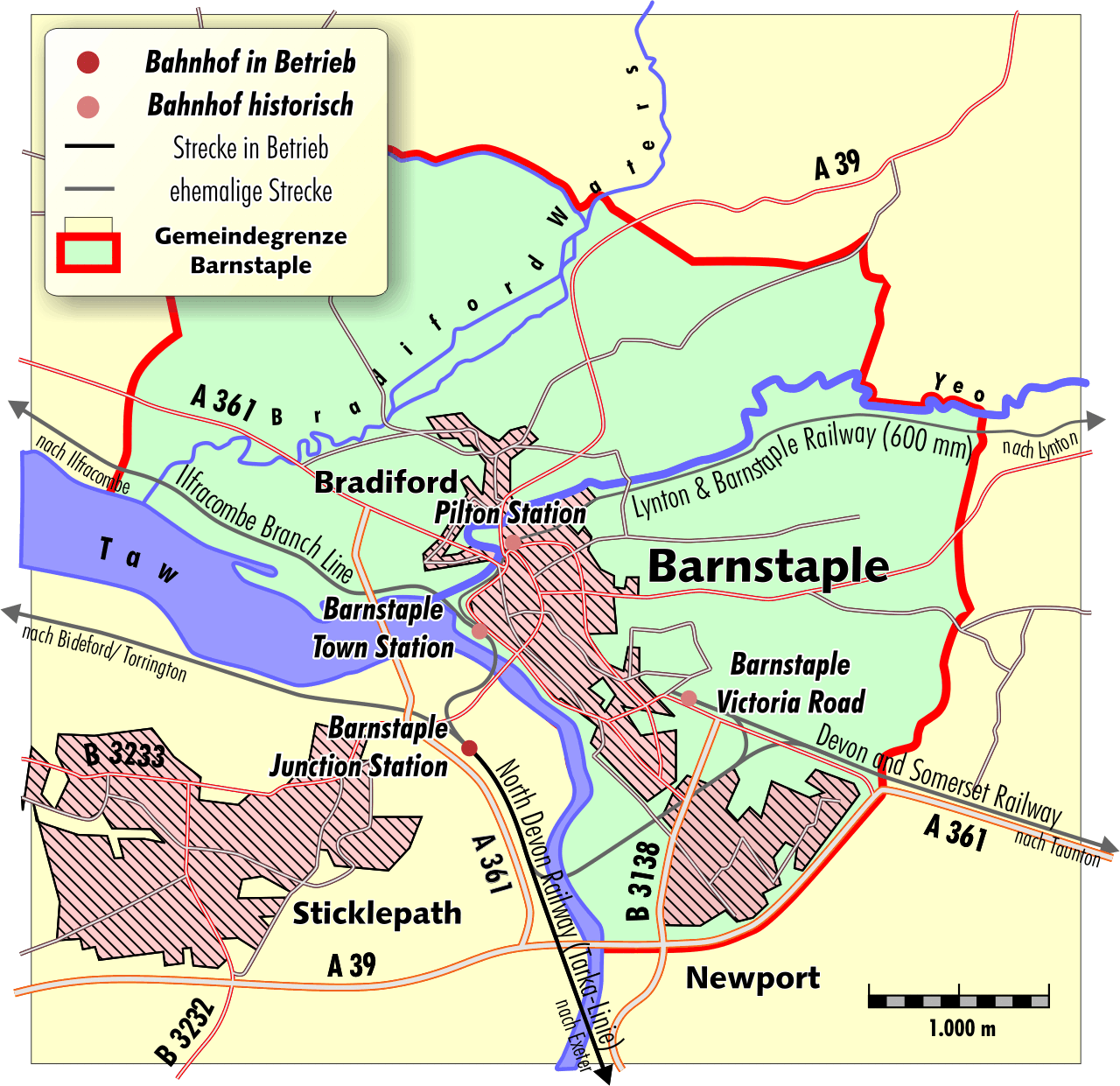
Barnstaple and its railways.: Black lines: in use; Grey lines: closed and lifted

The Taw Vale Railway & Dock opened a railway to carry goods traffic between a quay at Fremington Pill and Barnstaple in August 1848. William Thorne, who worked the horse-drawn trains, built a warehouse at the terminus in Barnstaple which was by the Sticklepath turnpike gate and the bridge across the River Taw.

On 1 August 1854 the North Devon Railway (as the Taw Vale was now known) opened a 7 ft 1/4 in (2,140 mm) gauge line from Crediton where it linked with the Exeter and Crediton Railway. The traffic on the original line between Barnstaple and Fremington had ceased in 1851 and this line was now rebuilt to the North Devon's broad gauge, reopening as part of the route to Bideford on 2 November 1855. The North Devon Railway was amalgamated into the London and South Western Railway (LSWR) on 1 January 1865 by which time the LSWR had already laid a third rail from Exeter to Bideford so that its 4 ft 8 1/2 in (1,435 mm) gauge trains could use the line.

A single platform on the river side of the line served passengers. A goods yard was laid out between the passenger station and the river which included a goods shed behind the platform and William Thorne's old warehouse. A second platform was added on 20 July 1874 when the Ilfracombe Branch Line opened. This included a new station at Barnstaple Quay on the other side of the river so the original 'Barnstaple' station was renamed Barnstaple Junction. Three years later, on 30 April 1877, the LSWR ceased operating broad gauge trains to Barnstaple.

The Devon and Somerset Railway had opened its own station in Barnstaple at Victoria Road in 1873 but from 1876 this was operated by the Great Western Railway (GWR). A connection was opened between the GWR station and the LSWR at Barnstaple Junction on 1 June 1887. This crossed the river on its own bridge and joined the LSWR line south of the Junction station. Some GWR trains continued beyond Barnstaple to Ilfracombe In 1891 a second track was brought into use on the Exeter line as far as umberleigh.The station was further enlarged and resignalled between 1922 and 1924. This included cutting back the hill above the station so that a new track could be added behind the platform that had been built in 1874 to provide an additional platform face.

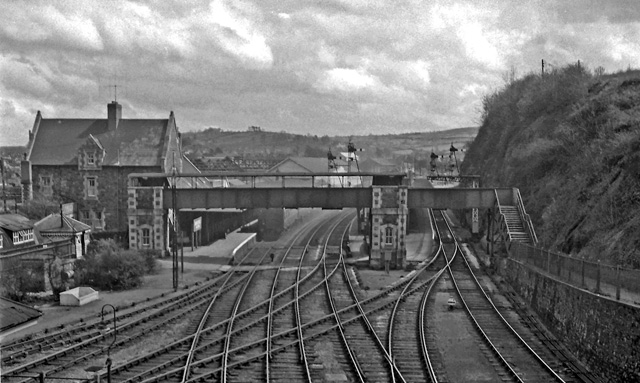
The station in April 1964. In the foreground, the Ilfracombe branch line tracks diverge to the left; the tracks to the right lead to Bideford.

With the creation of British Railways in 1948 there was opportunity to rationalise the facilities in Barnstaple. Most of the goods traffic was handled at the Victoria Road station although full wagons loads were still handled at Barnstaple Junction. Victoria Road closed to passengers on 12 June 1960 so all trains from Taunton ran to Barnstaple Junction. During the next ten years most of the lines around Barnstaple closed. Passenger services on the Bideford route ceased from 2 October 1965, the Taunton service was withdrawn from 3 October 1966, and the Ilfracombe branch closed on 5 October 1970. This just left the service to Exeter and Barnstaple Junction became plain Barnstaple once more. On 21 May 1971 the track was simplified and the line to Umberleigh was reduced to just one track. The goods trains to Victoria Road were withdrawn on 30 May 1970 and those on the Bideford line stopped on 31 August 1982.

A new booking office was opened on 10 November 1981 but the second platform was closed in August 1990. In 2008 a café was opened in the former station master's house.

=== Engine shed ===
The North Devon Railway had an engine shed and workshops at Barnstaple along with a 35 feet (11 m) turntable. These continued to be used by the LSWR although the workshops were closed in 1894. In later days the two-track timber engine shed was situated near the entrance to the goods yard and the turntable was replaced by a larger 50 feet (15 m) version. The former GWR shed at Victoria Road closed at the beginning of 1951 after when their locomotives were serviced at the Barnstaple Junction shed. This shed was closed after steam trains were replaced by diesels in 1964. At one time there were 44 engine drivers and 44 firemen at Barnstaple but by 1968 there were just 10 and 4 respectively, and none from 1971.

== Description ==
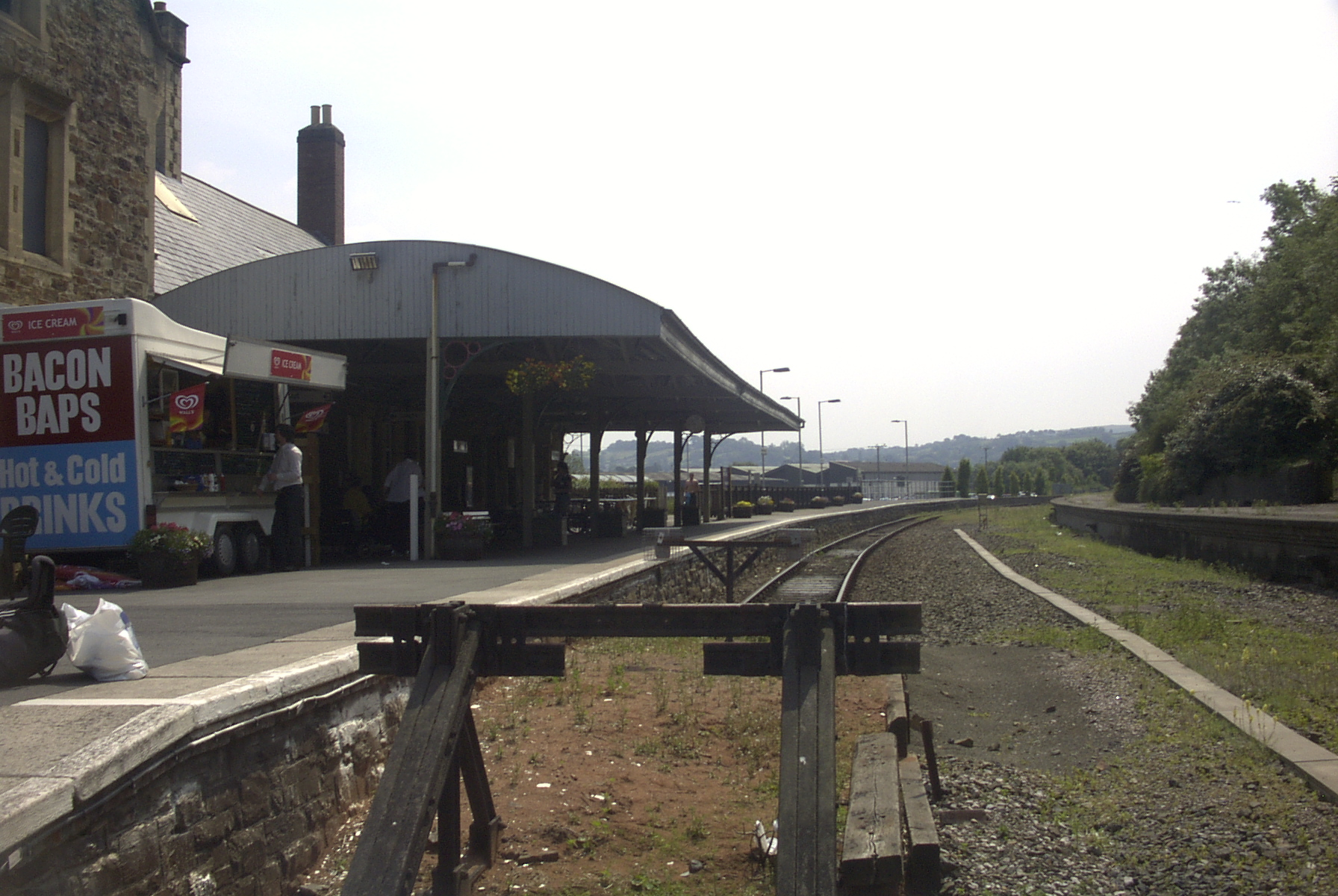
Looking towards Exeter

The railway station is on the west side of the River Taw near the Long Bridge and the junction of the A3125 and A361 roads; the town centre is on the east side. A footpath under the road gives access to the cycle and footpath along the disused railway towards Bideford which forms part of the South West Coast Path. The access road to the station goes through a retail park which is built on the site of the railway goods yard. The old stone building by the A3125 road is William Thorne's warehouse of 1848 which is now Grade II listed.

The station building contains the ticket office, toilets, café and a cycle hire office. The platform is long enough for an 11-coach train. There is just a single track in use (the second platform is derelict) but there is a siding with a loop line just south of the platform. The ticket office is usually open every day and a ticket machine is also provided. There is both a car park and bicycle rack.

== Services ==
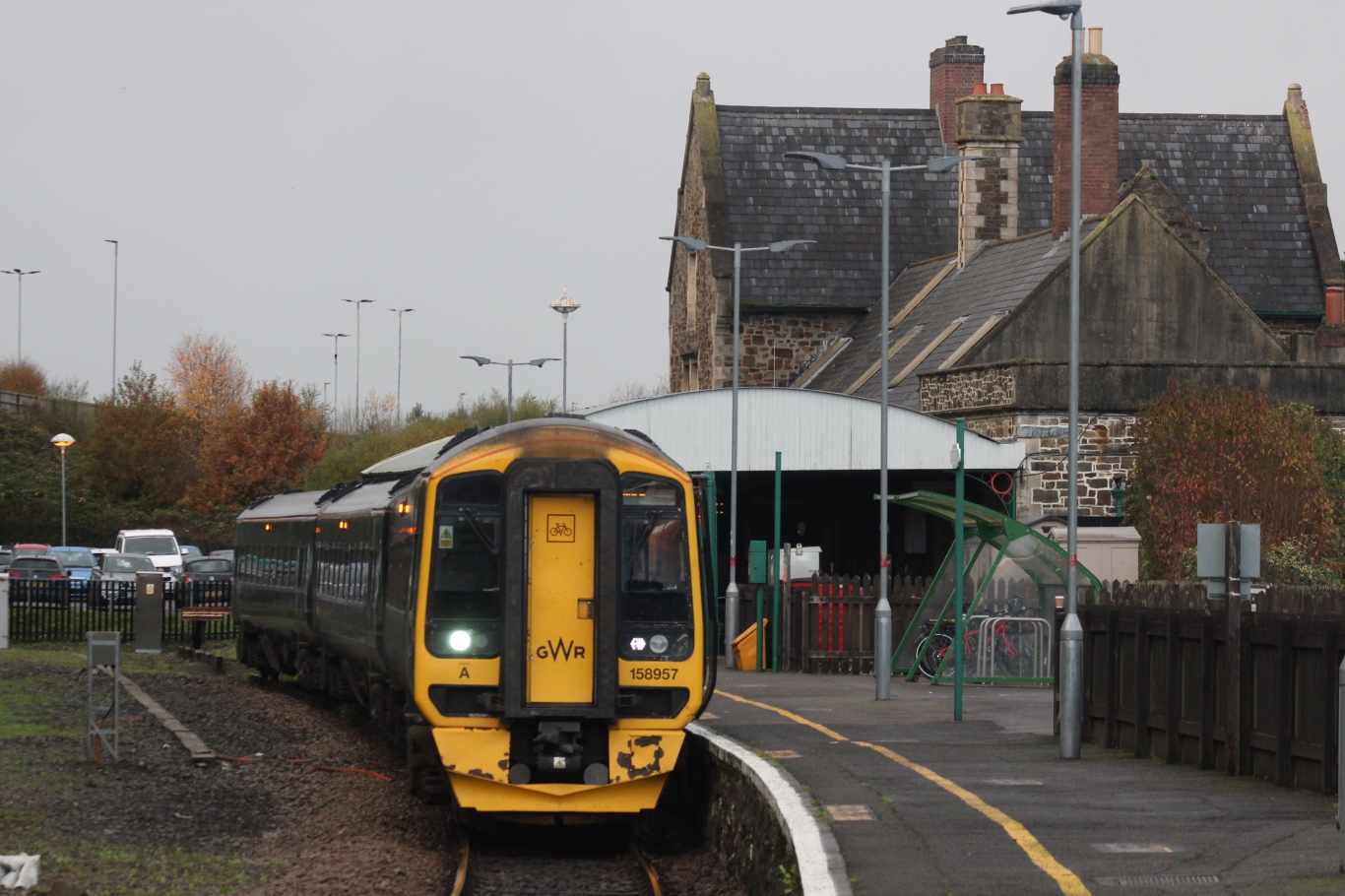
A Class 158 train to Exeter at Barnstaple station in November 2021

All services at Barnstaple are operated by Great Western Railway. There is generally one train per hour to Exeter Central but a very small number of services continue to or from other routes in East Devon on weekdays. The route mainly uses the Class 158 diesel units.

Preceding station	National Rail	Following station
Terminus	Great Western Railway Tarka Line	Chapelton towards Exeter Central
Historical railways
Barnstaple Town	London & South Western Railway; Exeter to Bideford Line; Ilfracombe Branch Line	Chapelton
Fremington	London & South Western Railway; Exeter to Bideford Line; Ilfracombe Branch Line	Chapelton
Barnstaple Town	Great Western Railway; Taunton to Barnstaple Line	Barnstaple Victoria Road

== Community railway ==
The railway between Barnstaple and Exeter is designated as a community railway and is supported by marketing provided by the Devon and Cornwall Rail Partnership. The line is promoted as the Tarka Line.

== Proposed developments ==
The Barnstaple to Bideford route was mentioned in the Association of Train Operating Companies 2009 Connecting Communities: Expanding Access to the Rail Network report which recommended some closed lines that could be rebuilt to restore railway services to large communities. Following from the reopening of the Dartmoor line to Okehampton in 2021, a local 'Atlantic Coast to Exeter' campaign resumed interest in reopening the line from Barnstaple to Bideford.

== Cultural references ==
The Guardian included the Barnstaple station café in its 2009 list of 'the ten best station cafés'.

This line to Bideford was recreated in miniature for one day in 2009 using OO gauge track for episode 6 of James May's Toy Stories, an attempt to build the longest ever model railway orchestrated by James May. Although the track was restored between the two towns the model railway trains were only able to reach the site of Instow signalbox due to the weather and vandalism. May stated that he chose the location for the attempt due to his desire to see the line restored. He repeated the experiment more successfully in 2011.

This station offers access to the South West Coast Path
Distance to path	50 yards (46 m)
Next station anticlockwise	Newquay 123 miles (198 km)
Next station clockwise	Minehead 69 miles (111 km)
