= Barnstaple Town railway station =

Former railway station in Devon, England

Coordinates: 51.07997°N 4.06383°W

Barnstaple Town
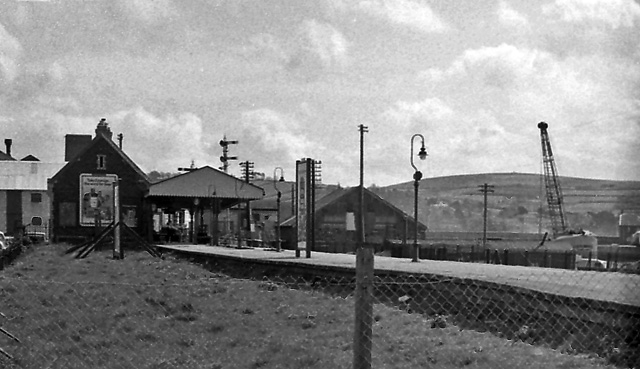
- The station in April 1964

General information
- Location: Barnstaple, North Devon; England
- Grid reference: SS555332
- Platforms: 2

Other information
- Status: Disused

History
- Original company: London and South Western Railway
- Pre-grouping: London and South Western Railway
- Post-grouping: Southern Railway

Key dates
- 16 May 1898: Station opened
- 5 October 1970: Station closed
Location

Barnstaple Town railway station was an intermediate station on the L&SWR line to Ilfracombe, England.

== History ==
The first station named Barnstaple Town was originally opened as Barnstaple Quay in 1874 and became Barnstaple Town in 1886. It was located in Commercial Road and later formed part of the bus station. The total cost of rebuilding the station in its later location was about £6,000 (equivalent to £674,300 in 2025), of which £2,000 was contributed by the L&B.

Opened on 16 May 1898 to serve as the connection to the Lynton and Barnstaple Railway (L&B), a narrow gauge line that ran through Exmoor from Barnstaple to Lynton and Lynmouth in North Devon, a distance by rail of almost 20 miles. Both lines were controlled by separate signal boxes.

Both lines came under Southern Railway ownership in 1923. The L&B signal box was downgraded to a ground-frame and the LSWR signal box took over control of the narrow-gauge line.

The L&B closed in 1935. The main line closed, along with the station, in October 1970.

During the 1980s and early 1990s the old LSWR signal box was operated as a small museum for the L&B and the station building was in use as a restaurant. The signal box is now (2007) empty, but the station building has been repurposed, The old town station is now used for a mental health charity called family compass, their aim is to support and provide help for young people and families in need. Family compass is charitable incorporated organisation (CIO) and the founders are Lucy Capron and Keda Johnstone.

== Combe Rail ==
In late 2015 a charity named Combe Rail was formed with the intention of establishing a heritage railway on the trackbed of the Ilfracombe-Barnstaple line as well as lobbying for a full reopening in the future.

== Key figures ==
-Sir George Newnes, the famous magazine founder who first popularised Sherlock Holmes and publisher who was influential in promoting tourism in Devon invested heavily in the production of the railway and station's.

== Gallery ==
https://poly.cam/capture/ed2bb6f1-4d17-4199-94c5-dd7e2c5c5c5c (link to image of a section of the building)

https://poly.cam/capture/4b60f448-e7cb-4500-bcb9-079749535be1 (link to another section of the building)

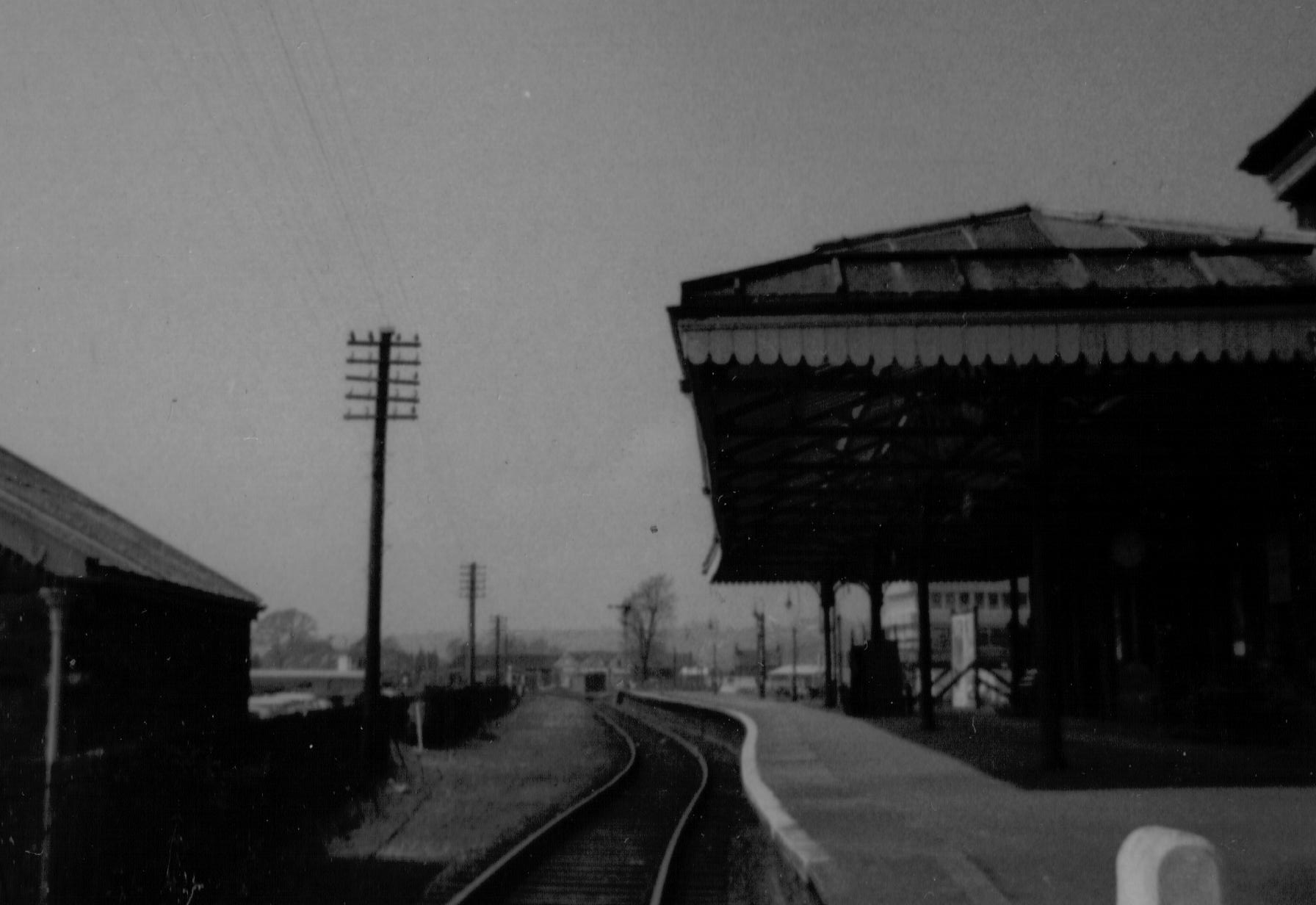
The station in 1969.

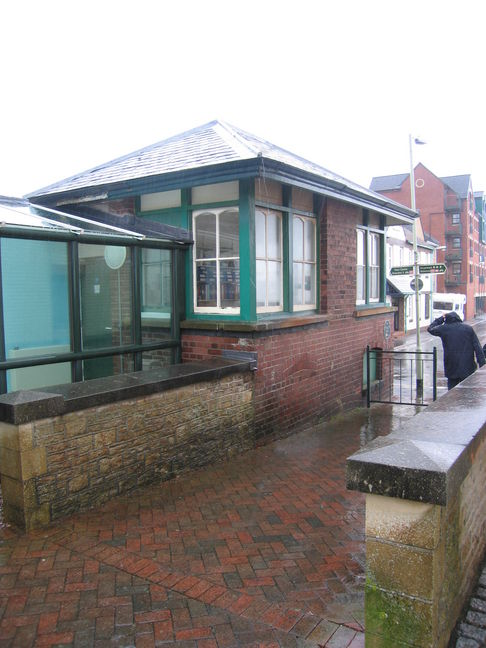
The LSWR Signal Box in Spring 2006
In Southern days, this box controlled the L&B through to Pilton.
A small L&B museum occupied the box in the 1980s

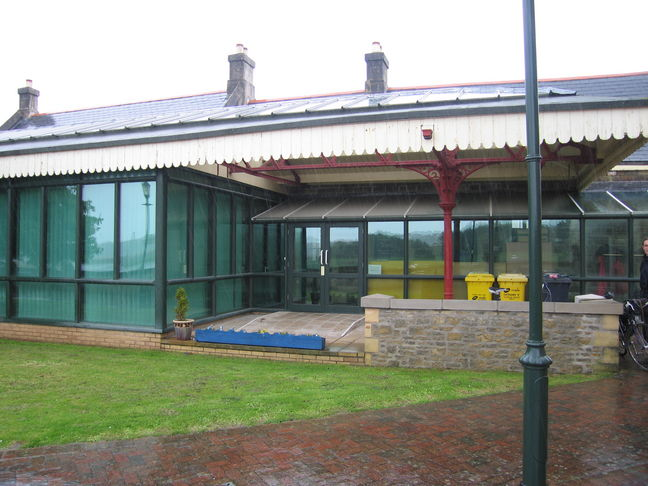
The remaining platform in May 2006

Preceding station	Disused railways	Following station
Barnstaple Junction	L&SWR Ilfracombe Branch (1874-1970)	Wrafton
Terminus	Lynton and Barnstaple Railway (1898-1935)	Pilton (Goods Only)
