= Ilfracombe railway station (England) =

Former railway station in Devon, England

Ilfracombe
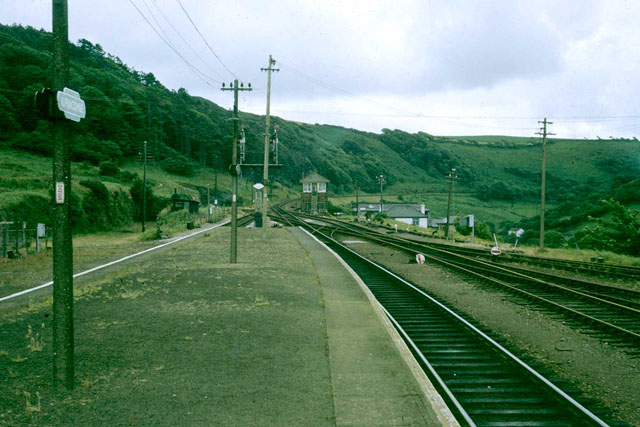
- Ilfracombe station approaches looking southwards

General information
- Location: North Devon; England
- Coordinates: 51.200°N 4.128°W
- Grid reference: SS514467
- Elevation: 225 feet (69 m)
- Platforms: 2

History
- Original company: Barnstaple & Ilfracombe Railway
- Pre-grouping: London and South Western Railway
- Post-grouping: Southern Railway

Key dates
- 20 July 1874: Opened
- 7 September 1964: Closed to goods
- 5 October 1970: Closed completely
Location

Ilfracombe railway station was the terminus of the Ilfracombe branch line in North Devon, England. The line was opened as the Barnstaple and Ilfracombe Railway, later becoming part of the London and South Western Railway, and eventually, part of the Southern Railway. It was opened in 1874, and closed in 1970.

== History ==
The line to Ilfracombe, and the stations on the line, opened on 20 July 1874 as the Barnstaple and Ilfracombe Railway. The local geography in the area proved problematic in siting a railway station in Ilfracombe. Even though the station was built on a hill overlooking the town, it still had a climb of 1-in-40 out of the station southwards. It was 226 miles (364 km) from London Waterloo station, 14 miles 74 chains (24 km) north of Barnstaple Junction, and was located some 225 feet (69 m) above sea level.

A diagram of the station from 1881, shows an island platform with a line on either side, a carriage siding to the west, and the goods shed and turntable to the east side of the station. The no. 1 road on the island platform (furthest west) had an overall roof at the northern end. In 1929, the Southern Railway undertook track improvements and expanded the carriage sidings to the west of the station to seven.

The 1904 Clearing House Handbook of stations listed Ilfracombe as being able to handle all main types of goods traffic (vans, horseboxes, parcels, etc), and was furnished with a crane capable of lifting 10 tonnes (11 tons). The booking office issued 69,000 tickets in 1928, 46,000 in 1930, 31,000 in 1932, 26,000 in 1934 and 24,000 in 1936. In January 1963, the line was transferred from the Southern Region of British Rail, to the Western Region. The turntable was removed from the site in 1964 when dieselisation of the branch using DMUs, made it unnecessary. Apart from a single platform with a run-round loop on the western side of the station, all other track was removed in 1967 when the entire branch was singled.

Goods facilities were removed in 1964, and all associated sidings for goods were removed in 1966. Closure of the entire line between Barnstaple and Ilfracombe was announced in December 1969. British Rail stated that the cost of operating the line came in at £93,000, against a revenue of just £13,300. The station was closed completely on 5 October 1970.

After closure, the station site was sold off and became the location of a factory making filtering equipment.

== Services ==
Upon opening in 1874, the line was worked as a branch by the London South Western Railway, compared to what was envisaged as the main line through Barnstaple to Torrington. The branch saw five down trains (to Ilfracombe), and four up trains (to Barnstaple), which provided a connection to express trains to London Waterloo. The timetable from 1887 shows seven workings northwards from Barnstaple, whilst the returns were nine southbound trains. In the summer of 1891, this had risen to twelve each way, and by 1909, summer services amounted to 17 daily. Of these workings, an average of four per day were through services from London Waterloo, and either one, or two daily from London Paddington.

In the dieselisation era of the early 1960s, some summer Saturday services numbered 17 trains to Ilfracombe. Most were through trains worked from places such as Taunton, Wolverhampton (Low Level), Carmarthen and Paddington. By the late 1960s, only five trains were running and no service ran on a Sunday, even during the summer holiday period.

Preceding station	Disused railways	Following station
Mortehoe and Woolacombe; Line and station closed	London and South Western Railway; Barnstaple and Ilfracombe Railway	Terminus
