= Trek =

Trek may refer to:

== Art and entertainment ==
- Trek (TV channel), a French TV channel
- Star Trek, a science fiction franchise

== Companies ==
- Trek Airways, an airline
- Trek Bicycle Corporation, a bicycle manufacturer

== Physical Activity ==
- Another term for hiking, walking lengthy distances in the countryside or wilderness

== Other uses ==
- Great Trek, a 19th-century migration of Africa's Boers
- the Trek experiment, UC Berkeley, on board STS-74
- KCNK2, otherwise known as the TREK-1 potassium channel

== See also ==
- Jan Jansz. Treck (1606–1652), still-life painter
- Treck Inc., a software company
- Trekking (disambiguation)
- Sea Trek (disambiguation)
- Trekboer
- Trekker (disambiguation)
