= Backpack (disambiguation) =

A backpack is a cloth sack carried on one's back and secured with straps.

Backpack may also refer to:

- Part of some sorts of equipment (e.g. breathing sets, flamethrowers) which is carried on the back
- Backpack, a novel by Emily Barr
- "Backpack", a song by Crazy Town from the album The Brimstone Sluggers
- "Backpack", a song by Justin Bieber from the album Journals
- Plymouth Backpack, a concept car
- Backpack, a character in Dora the Explorer
- Badge Backpack, a repository for collecting and displaying digital badges from a variety of sources
