= Tramp (disambiguation) =

A tramp is a long-term homeless person who travels from place to place as an itinerant vagrant, traditionally walking or hiking.

Tramp may also refer to:

== Entertainment ==
=== Film and TV ===
- The Tramp, an iconic character played by Charlie Chaplin
- The Tramp (film), a 1915 short film in which he appeared
- Tramp (Lady and the Tramp), a character in Disney's movie Lady and the Tramp
- Tramps (1983 film), an Austrian film
- Tramps (2016 film), an American film
- Tramp (EastEnders), a fictional dog in EastEnders
- The Tramps, one of the English-language names for Brazilian comedy group Os Trapalhões

=== Music ===
- Tramp (band), a British blues band
- Tramp (Swedish band)
- Tramp (album) a 2012 album by Sharon Van Etten
- "The Tramp" (song), a 1913 song by Joe Hill
- "Tramp" (The Stranglers song), a 1981 song by British rock group The Stranglers
- "Tramp" (Lowell Fulson song), also recorded by Otis Redding and Carla Thomas
- "The Tramps", an art song by Arthur Bliss (1891-1975)

== People ==
- Mike Tramp (born 1961), songwriter/singer
- David A. Trampier (born 1954), artist and writer who sometimes used the pseudonym "Tramp"

== Other uses ==
- Tramp (nightclub), a private, members-only nightclub in London
- Czech tramping, a youth and social-culture movement in Czechoslovakia from 1918 onwards
- Quasar Tramp, a Czech hang glider design
- USS Tramp (SP-646), a United States Navy patrol vessel in commission from 1917 to 1919
- Tramp, a racehorse in the 1847 Grand National at Aintree
- Tramp boat, a vessel engaged in the Tramp trade which undertakes voyages for hire
- A slang term for a slut in both American and British English
- A commonly used New Zealand term for a hike; see Tramping in New Zealand
- TRAMP, a network-transparent file access and remote shell package for GNU Emacs

== See also ==
- "Tramp! Tramp! Tramp!", an 1864 U.S. Civil War song by George F. Root
- Tramp, Tramp, Tramp (1942 film)
- Tramping (disambiguation)
- Tramp stamps (disambiguation)
- Saddle tramp (disambiguation)
- Trampin', a 2004 album by Patti Smith
- TranP, an adherent of Transnational progressivism
- Trump (disambiguation)
