= Backpacking =

Backpacking may refer to:

- Backpacking (travel), low-cost, independent, international travel
- Backpacking (hiking), trekking and camping overnight in the wilderness
- Ultralight backpacking, a style of wilderness backpacking with an emphasis on carrying as little as possible

== See also ==
- Hiking
- Backpacking with animals, using pack animals to carry gear while hiking or camping
- Backpacker (disambiguation)
- Backpack (disambiguation)
- Tramping (disambiguation), also called backpacking
