= Tramping =

Tramping may refer to:

== Travel ==
- Hiking
- Trekking
- Tramping in New Zealand, a style of backpacking or hiking
- Czech tramping, a Czech outdoors pastime

== Places ==
- Rural Municipality of Tramping Lake No. 380, Saskatchewan, Canada
  - Tramping Lake, Saskatchewan, Canada

== Other uses ==
- Trampin', an album by Patti Smith
- Flounder tramping, a method of catching flounder or other flat fish

== See also ==
- Backpacking (disambiguation), also called tramping
- Trekking (disambiguation)
- Tramping Lake (disambiguation)
- Tramp (disambiguation)
