= Taunton sleeping car fire =

1978 train fire in Somerset, England

Coordinates: 51.0246°N 3.125°W

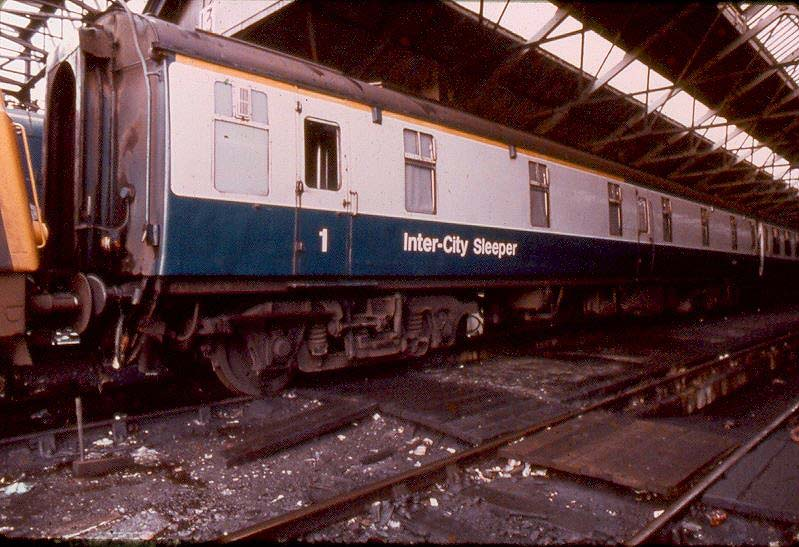
- A British Railways Mark 1 sleeping car, similar to the one involved in the accident

Details
- Date: 6 July 1978; 02:40
- Location: Taunton, Somerset
- Country: England
- Line: Great Western Main Line
- Cause: Obstructed electric heater

Statistics
- Trains: 1
- Passengers: ~8 coaches
- Deaths: 12
- Injured: 15

In the early hours of 6 July 1978, a fire broke out in a sleeping car train near Taunton, Somerset, England. The fire was caused by an electric heater that had been obstructed by sacks of dirty bed linen, causing it to overheat. Most deaths were due to smoke inhalation. Twelve people were killed and 15 were injured.

In response to the incident, British Rail adopted various fire safety measures on the newly introduced Mark 3 passenger carriages.

== Background ==
The fire started in a British Railways Mark 1 sleeping car (no. W2437) which had been built in 1960, at which time trains in the UK were mostly hauled by steam locomotives, which provided steam for heating passenger accommodation. Diesel locomotives of the period were fitted with boilers so that they could be used with existing coaches. However, with steam locomotives gone by the 1970s, and with boilers proving unreliable and expensive to maintain, the decision was made to change to electric train heating (ETH). W2437 was converted in 1976, with an electric heater being installed in the vestibule, although steam heating capability was retained. It was assumed that luggage and other items would not be placed in the vestibules against the heater and no warning notices were provided.

The Class 47-hauled 22:30 sleeping car express from Penzance to Paddington on 5 July 1978 was scheduled to pick up two sleeping cars at Plymouth; this arrangement was so that passengers joining the train there could go to bed without having to wait for the main service to arrive at around midnight.

The main store for bed linen on the Plymouth service was at Old Oak Common depot near London Paddington. Used bedding from Plymouth was previously transported in the guards van of the Plymouth portion, but in 1977 that vehicle was removed from the formation. Instead, the dirty linen was stacked in plastic bags in the vestibule of W2437, adjacent to the heater. At the time the ETH was not in use, but from May 1978, two months before the accident, ETH was brought into use instead of steam.

== Events ==
The train arrived at Plymouth from Penzance at 23:50. It was coupled up to the Plymouth sleeping cars (which included W2437) and the ETH was turned on at 00:15. The train departed on time at 00:30 and made scheduled stops at Newton Abbot and Exeter. Nobody who saw the train noticed anything amiss, but the bags of linen were now heating up. As they smouldered they began to give off toxic gases, including carbon monoxide. The ventilation system drew fresh air from the vestibule, and the gases were sucked into the system and into each berth.

A major fire developed and the train was stopped at 02:48 near Silk Mill signal box about 0.5 miles (0.80 km) short of Taunton railway station, Somerset, when the attendant pulled the communication cord. By that time, most of the victims were already dead from carbon monoxide poisoning and cyanide poisoning. A small number of passengers awoke and were able to escape, although they had considerable difficulty in doing so due to the smoke and heat. The sleeping car attendant of the Plymouth coaches could only shout a warning to a few of the occupants before he was overcome by smoke; it was the attendant in the adjacent coach who pulled the communication cord. Emergency services were able to access the railway line through Fairwater Close.

11 people died on the day of the accident and most deaths were due to smoke inhalation. A twelfth passenger, a Belgian national, died from pneumonia in August, having never regained consciousness.

== Consequences ==
In the immediate aftermath of the disaster David Penhaligon, the Liberal MP for Truro who regularly used the West Country sleeper stated in the House of Commons that "All the doors" on the train were "locked between carriages" and that all the external doors were locked except for the door where the attendant was. He also claimed that windows on the train which were supposed to be able to be opened rarely worked. These remarks echoed claims by passengers that locked doors had hampered escape efforts. In the same debate another West Country MP, Robin Maxwell-Hyslop, the Conservative MP for Tiverton, pointed out that 111 years earlier an inspector reporting on "the Irish Mail crash" - which actually was in 1868 - had warned that locking doors at the end of sleeping cars could result in passenger deaths and asked "should we not have learned by now?"

Initial reports showed that fire crews had difficulty during the rescue operation because doors on the train were locked. This was forbidden but it was commonplace for attendants to lock the end doors of the pair of coaches that they were responsible for. This meant that attendants could greet passengers on arrival, and it helped to keep out intruders. Following this discovery, British Rail stipulated that all doors were to be left unlocked at all times.

The Taunton fire occurred just as new Mark 3 sleeping cars were at the design stage. The decision was taken to install state-of-the art fire prevention measures including sophisticated warning systems, fire retardant materials, multilingual warning placards and revised emergency procedures.

== See also ==
- List of transportation fires
