= Penzance TMD =

Railway traction maintenance depot in Cornwall, England

Penzance Traction Maintenance Depot
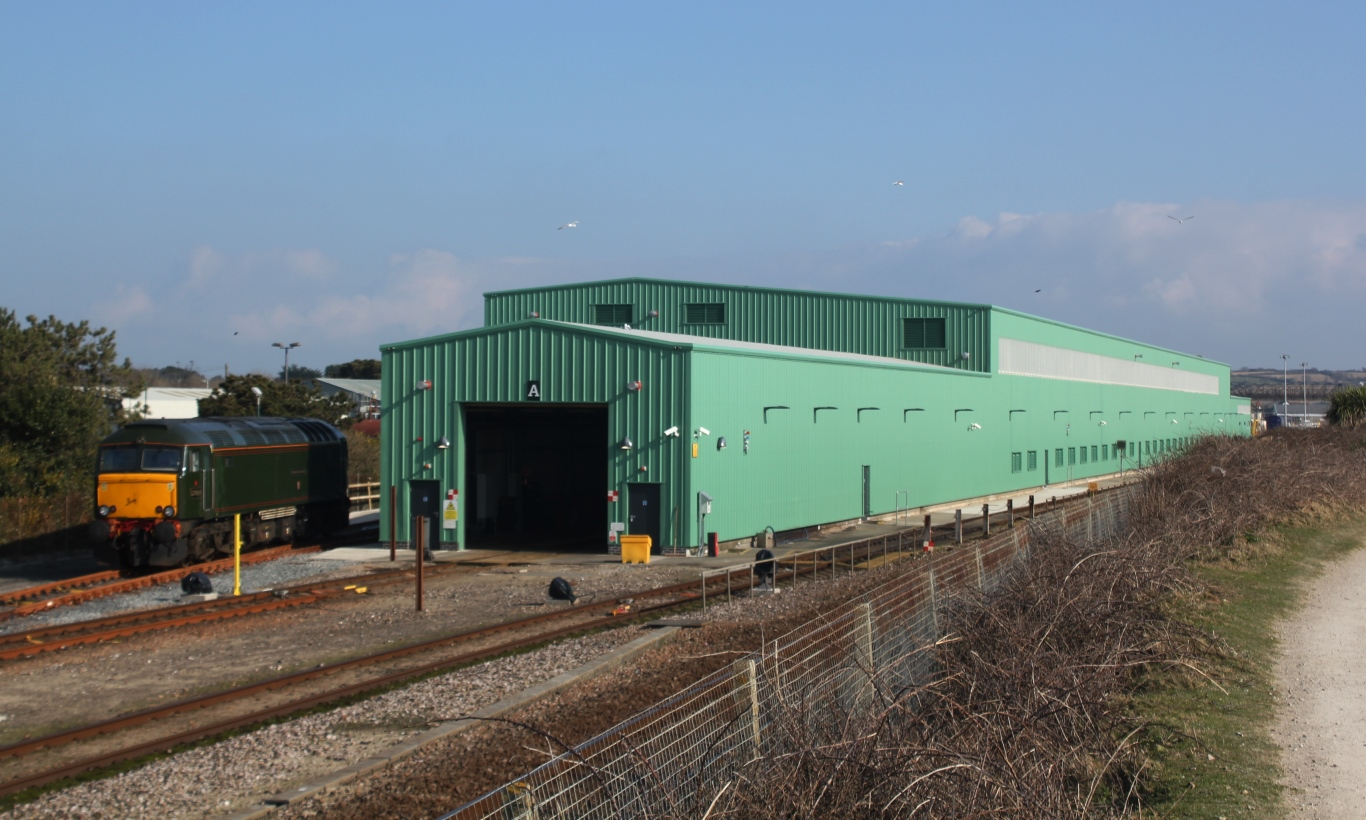
- The depot seen from the west end
- Interactive map of Penzance Traction Maintenance Depot

Location
- Location: Penzance, England
- Coordinates: 50.1279°N 5.5107°W
- OS grid: SW491312

Characteristics
- Owner: Great Western Railway
- Depot code: PZ
- Type: Diesel locomotives and coaches

History
- Opened: 1914
- Pre-grouping: Great Western Railway
- Former depot code: 83G, 84D

Penzance Traction Maintenance Depot, also known as Long Rock Depot, is a railway rolling stock depot in the village of Long Rock near Penzance in Cornwall, England. It was opened by the Great Western Railway in 1914 but has been rebuilt in 1977 and 2019.

It is the maintenance depot for locomotives and coaches used on the Night Riviera sleeper service between Penzance and London Paddington, these carry the depot code PZ. It also services other trains that are used in the area.

== History ==
=== Steam shed ===
An engine shed was provided at Penzance railway station but was moved to Long Rock in 1914 to free up space in the station. The new shed had four tracks for routine servicing and a fifth track on the north side for other repairs. The shed building measured 210 by 66 feet (64 m × 20 m) and there was a large turntable.

Long Rock serviced diesel locomotives from 1968 although steam locomotives continued to visit until 1962. The main line was reduced to a single track in 1974 to make room for a new diesel depot and the steam depot closed in June 1976.

=== Diesel shed ===
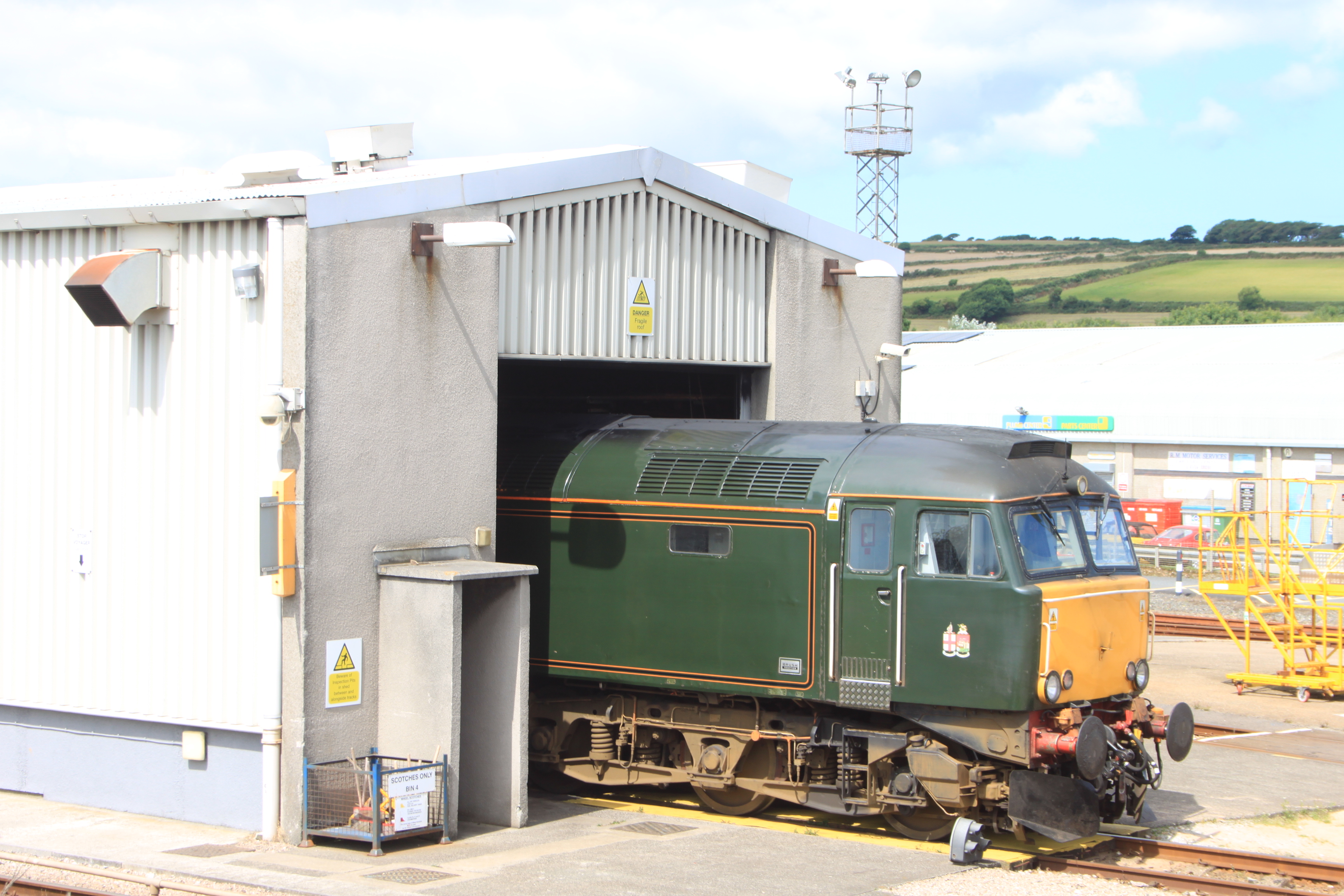
The east end of 1977 shed (and Class 57 57604)

A new depot was constructed on the same site as the steam shed, designed for British Rail's fleet of new Intercity 125 trains. It was ready for use in 1977.

Capacity at the depot was increased in a project that started in 2017 to cater for additional rolling stock maintenance such as additional cars for the Night Riviera sleeper service. The work cost £20m. On 13 April 2019, after the work was completed, an open day was held at the depot in aid of Penlee Lifeboat station and the RNLI.

== Description ==
The depot is on the north side the Cornish Main Line 1 mile 12 chains (1.9 km; 1.15 mi) from its terminus at Penzance railway station. Trains can access the depot from the station or through a connection at the east end near Long Rock level crossing, 1 mi 38 ch (2.4 km) from the station.

There are carriage sidings at both ends of the depot with fuelling facilities between the depot building and the main line.

== Administration ==
Penzance used to provide the locomotives for sub-sheds at St Ives and Helston. It was in the Newton Abbot Division until 1963 when a new Plymouth Division was created with its main depot at Laira.

The Great Western Railway introduced alphabetic codes to identify the allocation of locomotives in the early years of the twentieth century. Initially used only in documents, they were later painted onto the locomotives. Penzance was given code PZ. A different numeric code was used in later documents, Penzance being depot 153. British Railways introduced its national shed codes in 1950 which resulted in the PZ painted on locomotives being replaced by a cast plate showing 83G. In 1963 it became depot 84D in the new Plymouth Division. This numeric system was replaced by two-letter codes when the TOPS computer system was introduced in May 1973 and this saw Penzance reverting to PZ.

== Trains serviced ==
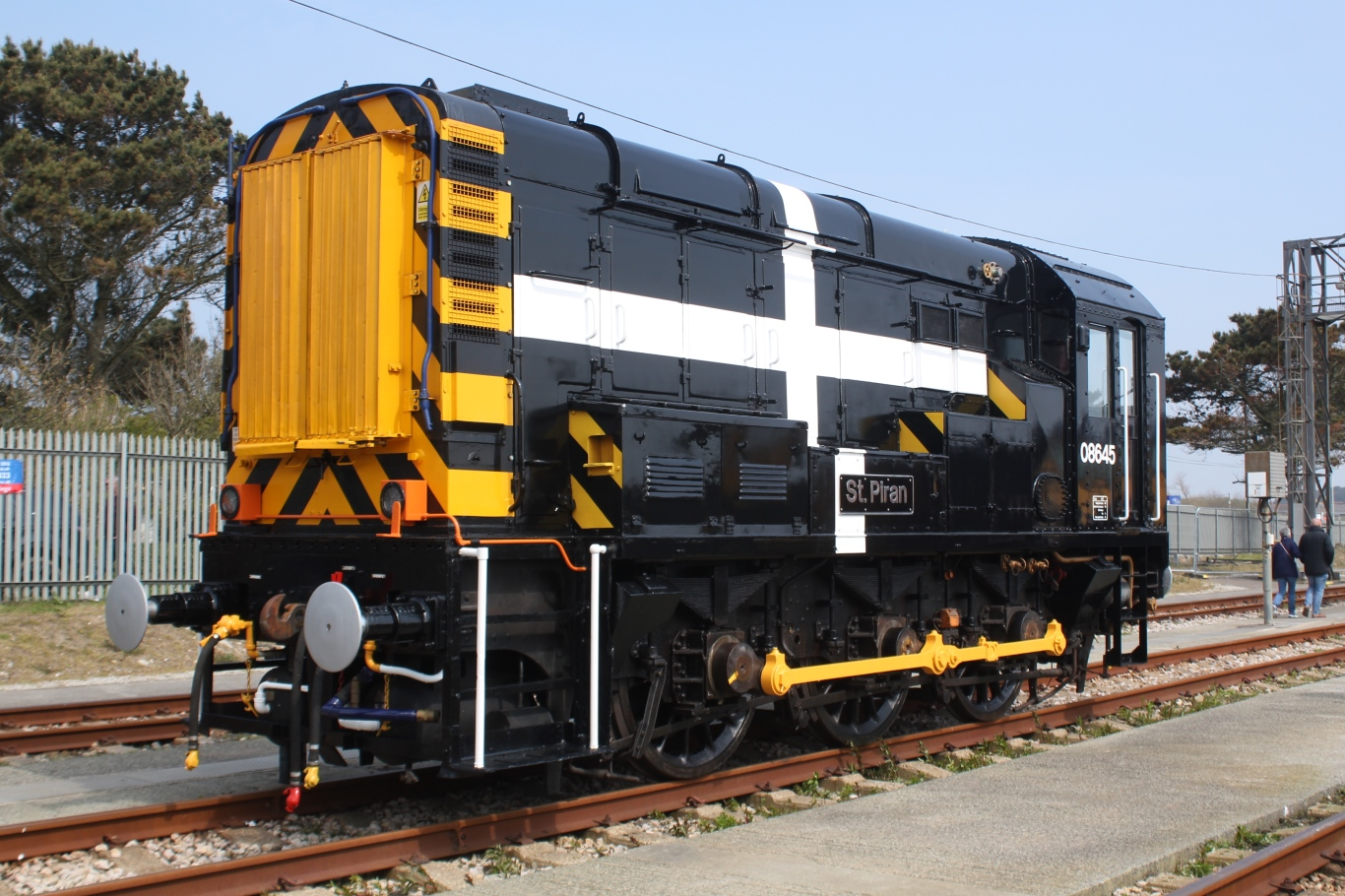
08645 St Piran

Allocated to the depot:

- Class 08 08645 St. Piran is the depot shunter
- Class 57 and the Mark 3 coaches for the Night Riviera overnight service to London Paddington.

The following classes visit the depot but are based elsewhere:

- Class 150, 158 and 175 for Great Western Railway local services, both mainline and branch line
- Class 800 and 802 for Great Western Railway long-distance services and local services
