= Backpacker =

A backpacker is a person who participates in any of several forms of backpacking.

Backpacker or backpackers may also refer to:

- Backpacker (magazine), an American magazine about wilderness hiking and adventure
- Backpacker (video game series), a series of Swedish computer games in which the player travels the world and answers questions about each locale
- Backpackers (film), an Indian Malayalam-language film directed by Jayaraj
- Backpackers (TV series), an Australian TV series following travelling backpackers in Europe
- Backpackers (web series), a Canadian comedy web series, later adapted for American television
- "Backpackers" (Bluey), an episode of the Australian animated television series Bluey
- "Backpackers", a song by Childish Gambino from Camp
- Backpacker, Australian and New Zealander slang for inexpensive sleeping accommodations, such as a hostel

== See also ==
- Mochilero (drug courier), Spanish for "backpacker"
