= The Sleeper =

2013 novel by Emily Barr

- Author: Emily Barr
- Language: English
- Genre: Psychological thriller, travel fiction
- Publisher: Headline Review
- Publication date: 4 July 2013
- Publication place: United Kingdom
- Media type: Print (paperback)
- Pages: 416
- ISBN: 9780755388004
- Preceded by: Stranded
- Followed by: Blackout

The Sleeper is the twelfth novel by English author Emily Barr, released in 2013. It is a psychological thriller with elements of travel fiction.

== Background ==
The novel was inspired by the author's own journeys on the Night Riviera sleeper train which runs from Cornwall to London as well as the 1945 film Brief Encounter.

The Sleeper was originally published in the UK by Headline Publishing Group on 4 July 2013 as a paperback. It was also made available as a Kindle ebook and an audiobook in CD format. The novel has been translated into Turkish, Greek, Spanish, German, Polish, Chinese and Russian.

The Sleeper fared well commercially and Barr revealed that it has been optioned for a TV series.

== Plot summary ==
The novel is written in a dual narrative.

Lara lives in Cornwall happily married to Sam, but secretly is bored by the rural life. She takes up a well-paid job as a property developer in London, which requires her to commute by a sleeper train every Sunday night from Truro to Paddington, and back home on Friday night. She makes friends with fellow commuters, including Guy with whom she starts an affair. One night, Guy gets murdered on the train, and Lara disappears without a trace somewhere between London and Truro. Her friend Iris does not believe the assumed version of events and sets out to find out what happened to Lara, supported by detective Alec. The trail takes her all the way to Thailand and Singapore, where she learns of her friend's long-hidden dark secrets. Lara's past as a drug smuggler has caught up with her, putting her in grave danger.

== Characters ==
- Lara Finch
- Sam Finch – Lara's husband
- Iris – Lara's friend
- Guy – Lara's lover
- Leon – Lara's godfather
- Olivia – Lara's sister
- Alec Zielowski

== Critical reception ==
The novel received generally favourable opinions, with reviewers describing it as "gripping". The critics praised the twists and turns in the story, although some found aspects of the plot "far-fetched" and "implausible". Some reviewers reflected negatively on the novel, criticising the slow start and the overall style of the writing.
