= Tramping Lake =

Tramping Lake may refer to:

- Tramping Lake, Saskatchewan, a village in Saskatchewan, Canada
- Tramping Lake (Saskatchewan), a lake in Saskatchewan, Canada
- Rural Municipality of Tramping Lake No. 380, a rural municipality in Saskatchewan, Canada
- Tramping Lake (electoral district), a former provincial riding in Saskatchewan, Canada

== See also ==
- Tramping (disambiguation)
