= Trekker =

Trekker may refer to:

- Trekker (comics), a comic book series
- Trekkie or Trekker, a fan of Star Trek
- Trekker, a person who goes Backpacking
- Toyota Trekker, Japanese SUV
- VW Trekker, German convertible

== See also ==
- Trek (disambiguation)
- Trekboer
