= Tramp stamps =

Tramp stamps may refer to:

- A sexist nickname for lower-back tattoos
- Tramp Stamps (band), formed in 2020 in Nashville, Tennessee
- Tramp Stamps and Birthmarks, a 2012 album by Logan Lynn
