= Emily Barr =

British writer

- Born: Emily Venie Barr; 10 October 1971 (age 55); Howden, Yorkshire, England
- Education: The Courtauld Institute of Art
- Writing career
- Language: English
- Years active: 2001–present
- Genres: Psychological thriller; travel fiction; chick lit; young adult fiction; horror fiction

Emily Venie Barr (born 10 October 1971) is a British novelist writing mainly psychological thrillers and travel fiction. She started her career as a journalist for The Guardian in the 1990s, and debuted with the acclaimed novel Backpack in 2001. She wrote a dozen of adult novels before transitioning into young adult fiction with The One Memory of Flora Banks in 2016. Barr has also taught creative writing at the Falmouth University and the Faber Academy, among others.

== Early life ==
Barr spent her early childhood in York and then grew up in Norfolk. She attended Norwich High School for Girls before going on to study at the Courtauld Institute of Art. She has spent some of her teenage years in South Wales.

Emily has been interested in becoming a writer since her early years. She has cited Agatha Christie and Margaret Atwood as the authors who inspired her to pursue writing.

== Career ==
In the 1990s, Barr started working as a journalist for The Guardian, writing a column titled "The Other Half". In 1998, she embarked on a year-long work trip around the world, writing a travel column as she went, visiting Brazil, the US, New Zealand, Australia and Southeast Asia, among others. While in Bangkok, Thailand, she appeared as an extra in the film The Beach. The journey inspired her first novel, Backpack, published in February 2001 by Headline Publishing Group. The book was a commercial and critical success, and won the WHSmith New Talent Award in 2002. In September 2002, Barr published her second novel, Baggage, which received mixed reviews. Her subsequent novels, such as Cuban Heels and Atlantic Shift, leaned into the chick lit genre.

Barr released a sequel to Backpack in September 2009, titled The Life You Want, which received mainly positive reviews. Her 2011 novel The First Wife, set in Cornwall and Barcelona and taking inspiration from Daphne du Maurier's Rebecca, was also met with positive reception. In May 2012, Barr released Stranded, followed by The Sleeper in July 2013, which forayed more into crime fiction. In 2014, she released a novella, Blackout, for the Quick Reads series.

Her first young adult novel, The One Memory of Flora Banks, was published by Penguin Books as an ebook in 2016 and paperback in 2017. It has been translated into 26 languages and has sold over 50,000 copies. Barr followed it with another young adult book, The Truth and Lies of Ella Black in 2018. Her first horror novel, We Hear Voices, was released only in the US by Berkley Books in late 2020 under the pen name Evie Green. In May 2021, after a year-long delay caused by the COVID-19 pandemic, Barr published Things to Do Before the End of the World which tackled the topic of climate change. Her 2022 novel Ghosted, blending love story and murder mystery, received positive reviews.

In 2024, Barr contributed a short story in the anthology 13 Cornish Ghost Stories. In 2025, she spent a month in Kraków, Poland, representing her hometown of Norwich during UNESCO's City of Literature programme.

== Personal life ==
Barr met her partner Craig in China, while travelling around the world in the late 1990s. After living in Brighton, they moved to the South of France, spending several years in the Landes region, before relocating to Falmouth, Cornwall in 2008. They have three children.

Barr has expressed support for the Labour Party and Liberal Democrats, and a strong disapproval of Brexit.

== Bibliography ==
- Backpack (2001)
- Baggage (2002)
- Cuban Heels (2003; also known as Cuba)
- Atlantic Shift (2004; also known as Solo)
- Plan B (2005)
- Out of My Depth (2006)
- The Sisterhood (2008)
- The Life You Want (2009)
- The Perfect Lie (2010)
- The First Wife (2011)
- Stranded (2012)
- The Sleeper (2013)
- Blackout (2014)
- The One Memory of Flora Banks (2016)
- The Truth and Lies of Ella Black (2018)
- The Girl Who Came Out of the Woods (2019)
- We Hear Voices (2020; as Evie Green)
- Things to Do Before the End of the World (2021)
- Ghosted (2022)
- The New One (2023; as Evie Green)
- This Summer's Secrets (2023)
- A Girl Can Dream (2024)
- The Other Girl (2025)
- Lies We Told This Summer (2026)
