= Ripple20 =

Set of software security vulnerabilities

Ripple20 is a set of vulnerabilities discovered in 2020 in a software library that implemented a TCP/IP stack. The security concerns were discovered by JSOF, which named the collective vulnerabilities for how one company's code became embedded into numerous products. The software library was created around 1997 and had been implemented by many manufacturers of online devices.

== Description ==
Ripple20 is a set of 19 vulnerabilities discovered in 2020 in a software library developed by the Cincinnati-based company Treck Inc., which implemented a TCP/IP stack.

== History ==
The first release of Treck's library was around 1997. Treck had also worked with Elmic Systems, which created a fork of the library when the companies ended their collaboration. In September 2019, JSOF researchers Moshe Kol, Ariel Schön and Shlomi Oberman analyzed a device containing code from the library and discovered it had vulnerabilities. Further analysis determined that the code originated from Treck's library, which had been widely implemented by numerous manufacturers. The disclosure of the vulnerabilities was made in June 2020. Ripple20 was chosen as the name for the set of vulnerabilities based on the disclosure year and the idea that the problems "rippled" through the supply chain from one company. It is difficult to identify all affected devices, because manufacturers may not realize that the library was used in one of their components.
