= Sleeper Either Class =

Rail sleeping car

British Rail Sleeper Either Class
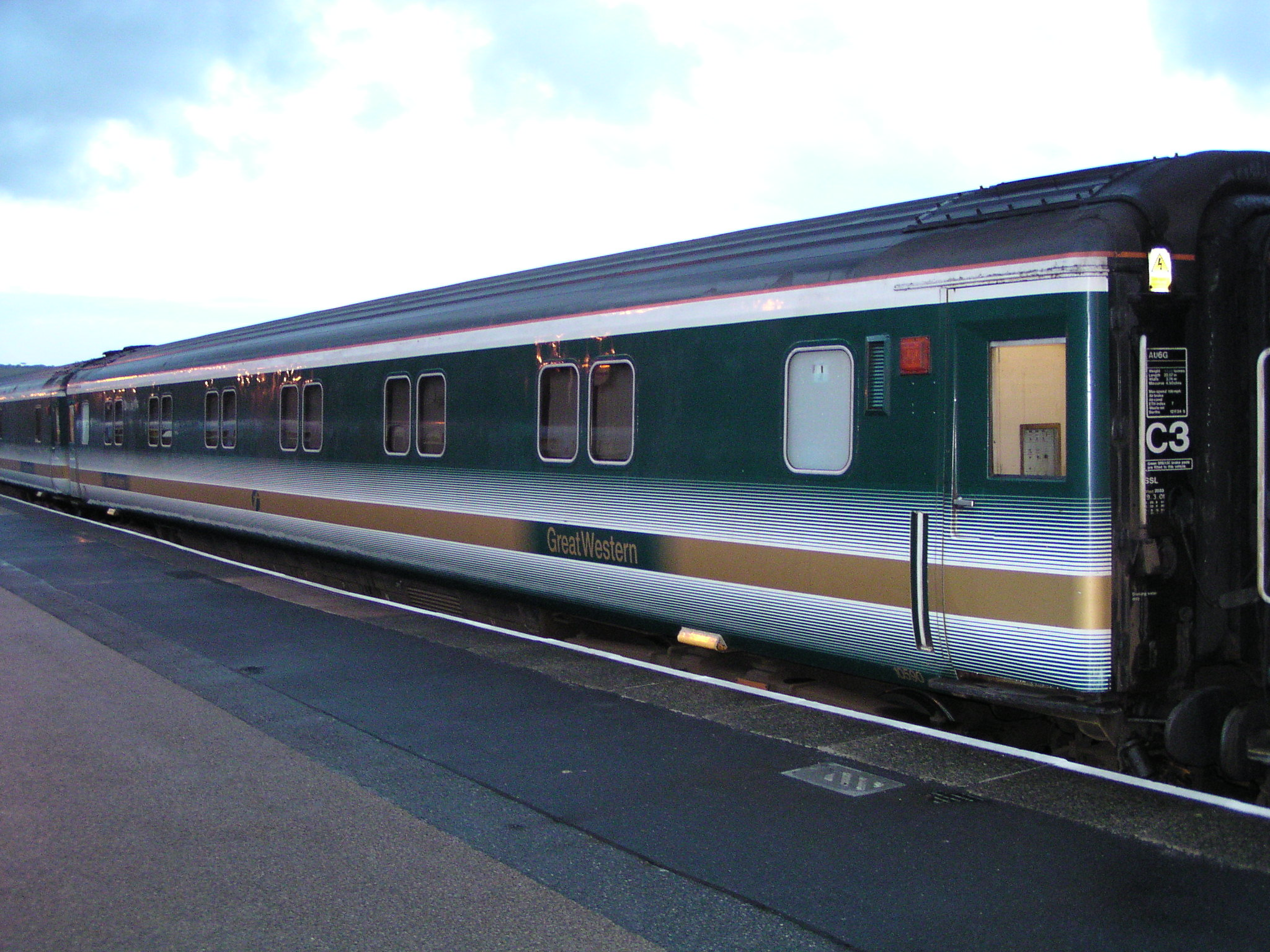
- First Great Western Night Riviera at Penzance
- In service: 1982–
- Manufacturer: British Rail Engineering Limited
- Built at: Derby Litchurch Lane Works
- Family name: British Rail Mark 3
- Constructed: 1981–1984
- Number built: 208 (120 SLEP, 88 SLE)
- Successor: British Rail Mark 5 (Caledonian Sleeper)
- Fleet numbers: SLEP: 10500–10619, SLE: 10646–10733
- Capacity: SLEP: 12–24 beds (12 compartments), SLE: 13–26 beds (13 compartments)
- Operators: Great Western Railway

Specifications
- Car length: 75 ft 0 in (22.86 m)
- Maximum speed: 125 mph (200 km/h)
- Weight: 43 t (42 long tons; 47 short tons)
- HVAC: Electric heating (ETH index SLEP: 7, SLE: 6), air conditioned, electric cooking
- Bogies: BT10
- Braking system(s): Air
- Track gauge: 4 ft 8 1/2 in (1,435 mm)

A Sleeper Either class (SLE) and Sleeper Either class with Pantry (SLEP) are a type of railway sleeping car used in Great Britain. Some units were later modified for better wheelchair access as Sleeper Either class Disabled (SLED). A smaller number reused in Denmark were classified as WLABr.

A total of 208 vehicles were built at Derby Litchurch Lane Works by British Rail Engineering Limited between 1982–1984 to the British Rail Mark 3A profile for British Rail. They were introduced to replace an ageing fleet of Mark 1 sleeper cars built to various designs and which dated from the late 1950s to early 1960s. The order consisted of 88 SLE variants, numbered 10646–10733, were constructed with thirteen bedrooms each, and 120 SLEP variants, numbered 10500–10619 constructed with twelve bedrooms with the last compartment used for an attendant. The Mark 3 air-conditioned sleeping cars were introduced including many additional safety features that had been lacking in the Mark 1 carriages that had caught fire at Taunton. The Night Riviera stock was the first on the route fitted with controlled emission toilets.

As of October 2019, the only mainline operator of this type of carriages are Great Western Railway on the Night Riviera, whose fleet was refurbished in 2017.

With the decline of overnight sleeper services in the United Kingdom shortly after their introduction at the end of the 1980s, many of the carriages later were moved to heritage railways to provide sleeping accommodation for heritage staff and volunteers.

== Service ==
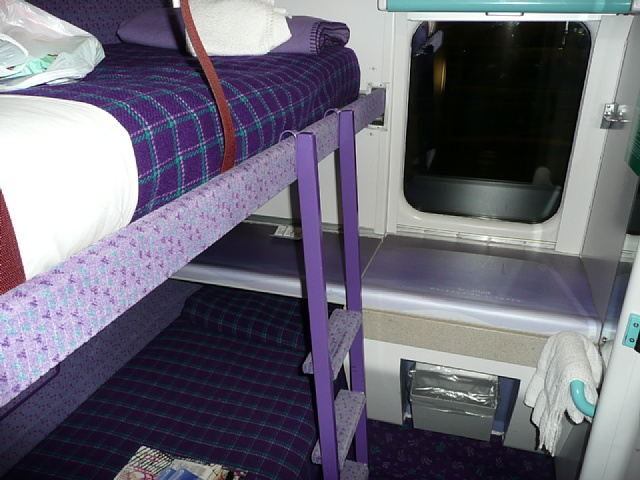
Caledonian Sleeper Single berth

Mk3 sleeper vehicles remain in use on the Great Western Railway's Night Riviera from London Paddington to Penzance in Cornwall. All Night Riviera sleeper carriages have been refurbished, and feature keycard locks, new lighting, a wardrobe and under-bed storage. SLED vehicles, with disabled-accessible berth and toilet, were also added.

The various Scottish services continue to depart from London Euston for final destinations at Glasgow Central, Edinburgh Waverley, Aberdeen, Inverness and Fort William, but the Caledonian Sleeper Mark 3 sleeper sets were withdrawn in October 2019.

Between 1988 and 1998, ten SLE carriages were leased to Danish State Railways (DSB) for use in Denmark. This lease came to an end following the opening of the Great Belt Fixed Link combined bridge and tunnel. During this time, the vehicles were classified as WLABr and each carried a UIC number.

== Preservation ==
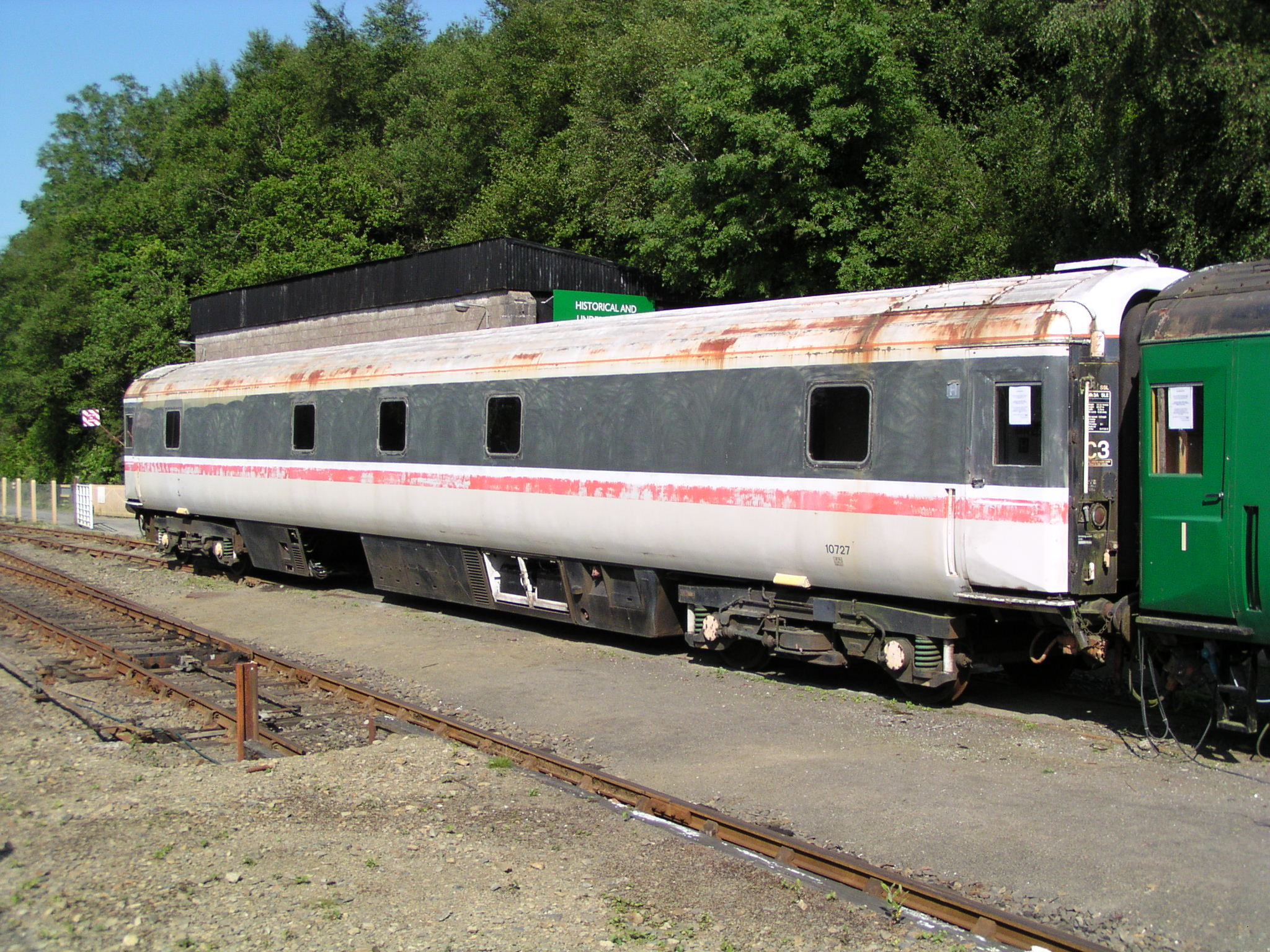
SLE coach as static volunteer accommodation on a heritage railway

Following the withdrawal of many overnight sleeper services in the late-1980s, many Mark 3 SLEP sleeper carriages were obtained by heritage railways in order to provide sleeping accommodation for heritage staff and volunteers. In 2019, some of the former Caledonian Sleeper carriages were preserved.

As of 2020 there were 1 SLED, 15 SLEs and 33 SLEPs in preservation at heritage railways. Since 2016, a sleeper repatriated from Denmark has been operated as a static hostel for members of the public by the Telford Steam Railway.
