= Backpackers (TV series) =

Travel-reality TV program

Backpackers is a mixed genre travel-reality television program created by and starring friends Mick Middleton, James Grech (JAG) and Lee Mahoney from Colac, Victoria.

The show was shot on three cameras over a year as Middleton, Grech and Mahoney left everything behind and backpacked on a shoestring budget around Europe.

It began airing in Australia on 13 November 2006 on Foxtel's Channel V, but had already been picked up and aired in other countries throughout the world, including OLN Canada, C4 New Zealand, Extreme sports channel Extreme Sports Channel in England, in Turkey, Dream TV Turkey and Channel V in Malaysia.

The program has received mixed reviews and cult recognition due to the nature in which the three backpackers went about making the show on small cameras and traveling on their own funds, interviewing, partying and recording all the random moments that occurred throughout the trip.

Backpackers has been both criticized and praised for its honest portrayal of a year of budget travel and has received a small cult base.

== Episode list ==
| Episode # | Aus air date | Episode name | Description |
|---|---|---|---|
| 1 | 2006-11-13 | Three Men & a Pilot | (London In the first episode Mick, Jag and Lee are introduced; three mates from Melbourne, Australia. They are about to say their goodbyes and get on a plane for a year trip around Europe. Once in England the fun begins as Lee gets a girl) |
| 2 | 2006-12-13 | We're in London Still | (London Tooth troubles) |
| 3 | 2007-01-13 | To be Sure! | (Ireland, St Patrick's Day The guys travel through the Republic of Ireland and Northern Ireland talking about clock building and visiting the site where the Titanic was built, and as always having problems with Van Damme. But with money getting low the boys decide to head to Scotland to work, and pimp out Van Damme.) |
| 4 | 2007-02-13 | Belfast Burryman or Bust | Ireland to Scotland (The boys go in search of the Lock ness monster, cook haggis, make kilts and learn to dance.) |
| 5 | 2007-03-13 | Double Creamery Poltergeist | Scotland (Cheese Roll) As the guys say their goodbyes to their jobs and friends in Scotland they head over to France where they get beer at Maccas and get in trouble with the police. Oh and there are more problems with Van Damme. |
| 6 | 2007-04-13 | That's no' how you make Haggis! | Scottish Experience (The group are now in Spain, which means drinks, bulls and good times to be had.) |
| 7 | 2007-05-13 | Adios Scotland | (Scotland to France The Guys and girls Of Van Damme drive from Spain into Portugal, but not before stopping and checking out the little city of Cuntis & plenty of beaches) |
| 8 | 2007-06-13 | Pooing our Pants in Pamploma | Spain, Running of the Bulls |
| 9 | 2007-07-13 | Spain, Portugal, Spain, Portugal! | (Spain - Portugal, Island Getaway) |
| 10 | 2007-08-13 | Those Damn Sirens! | (Portugal, Lagos Party Life!) |
| 11 | 2007-09-13 | Food Fight! | (Portugal - Spain, La Tomatina) |
| 12 | 2007-10-13 | Where? | (Spain to Andorra) |
| 13 | 2007-11-13 | Hello my Rag-Time Gal! | (After dropping the girls off at the airport to do their own thing, the guys head to a little town and have a look around, also eat frogs legs, snails and find a little town called Condom) |
| 14 | 2007-12-13 | Them Dry Bones! | (Paris, Catacombs) |
| 15 | 2008-01-13 | Stolen Memories | (France to Germany, Oktoberfest) |
| 16 | 2008-02-13 | Fook you! | (Germany to Austria) |
| 17 | 2008-03-13 | Don't fear the reaper! | (Austria to Czech, Bone Church) |
| 18 | 2008-04-13 | Trick or Treat! | (Czech to Hungary/Romania/Austria) |
| 19 | 2008-05-13 | Backpacker Pis | (Belgium, Chocolatier!) |
| 20 | 2008-06-13 | High Times! | (Amsterdam) |
| 21 | 2008-07-13 | Dora the Explora! | (London, selling the van) |
| 22 | 2008-08-13 | Buon anno! | (Italy NYE Rome) |
| 23 | 2008-09-13 | The boot continued | (Italy to Cicily, Mt Etna) |
| 24 | 2008-10-13 | How do you make a Maltese Cross? | (Malta Family reunion) |
| 25 | 2008-11-13 | Backpackers Boat Bonanza | (Malta - Denmark, Sweden!) |
| 26 | 2008-12-13 | Three Men and a Season finale | (The Return home) |
