= Night Riviera =

Overnight sleeper train between London and Cornwall

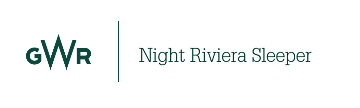

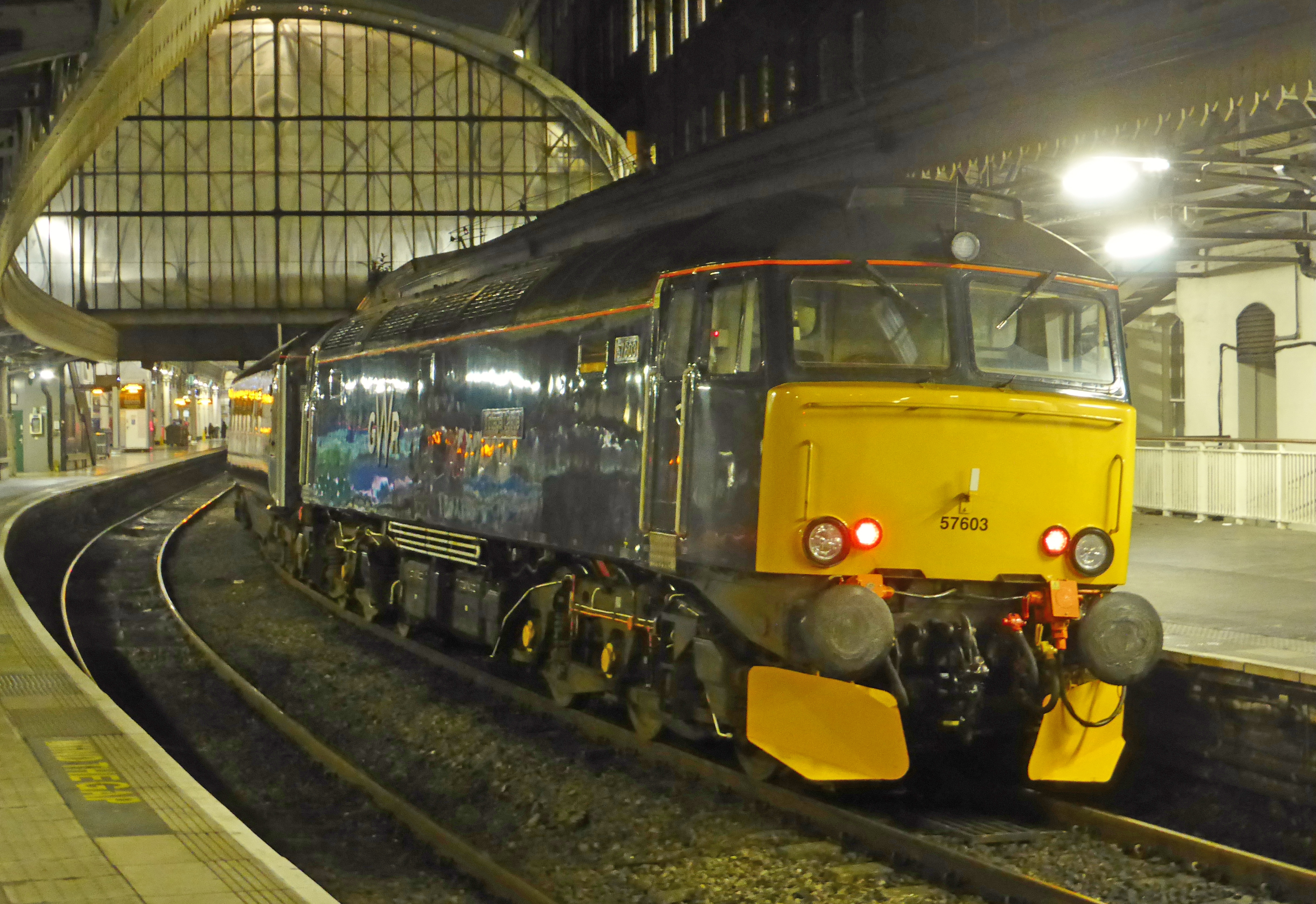
- 57603 in Great Western Railway livery with the Night Riviera at Paddington

Overview
- Service type: Overnight passenger train
- First service: 11 July 1983
- Current operator: Great Western Railway
- Former operator: InterCity (British Rail)
- Website: gwr.com/travelling-with-us/night-riviera-sleeper

Route
- Termini: London Paddington; Penzance
- Distance travelled: 305 miles (491 km)
- Average journey time: 7 hours 30 minutes
- Service frequency: 6 x weekly
- Train numbers: 1C50 (westbound); 1A50 (eastbound)
- Lines used: Great Western Main Line; Reading to Taunton; Taunton to Exeter; Exeter to Plymouth; Cornish Main Line

Technical
- Rolling stock: 4 Class 57 locomotives; 10 Mark 3 Sleeping carriages; 8 Mark 3 Seating carriages
Route map

The Night Riviera (Cornish: Koskador Ruvyer an Nos) is a sleeper train operated by Great Western Railway (GWR). It is one of only two sleeper services on the railway in the United Kingdom (the other being the Caledonian Sleeper services between London and Scotland). The Night Riviera runs six nights a week (Sunday–Friday) between London Paddington and Penzance with one train in each direction.

== Background ==
The first sleeping car train on the Great Western Railway was introduced at the end of 1877 from London Paddington to Plymouth Millbay. This had 7 ft (2,134 mm) broad gauge carriages with two dormitories, one with seven gentlemen's berths and the other with four ladies' berths. These were replaced in 1881 by new carriages with six individual compartments.

An additional service was soon added from London to Penzance which eventually became known as the Night Riviera. In 1920, the two trains left London at 22:00 for Penzance and midnight for Plymouth; by 1947, they had been brought forward to 21:50 and 23:50. Under British Rail sleeping cars were limited to just the Penzance service, although sleeping cars were detached from the Penzance service at Plymouth until 2006.

== Incidents ==
On 22 December 1945 at 00:45, the sleeper service from Paddington collided with the back of the 23.00 train from Paddington near Sonning. The engine of the sleeper service was derailed and it and four parcel vans on the rear of the 23.00 service were badly damaged.

On 23 November 1983, the Night Riviera derailed on approach to London Paddington with locomotive 50041 sliding for 100 metres on its side. There were no casualties.

=== Taunton sleeping car fire ===
On 5 July 1978, the up train left Penzance at 21:30. Approaching Taunton early the next morning, the emergency brake was activated and it came to a stand short of the station with one of the carriages on fire. This had been caused by dirty linen that had been placed near a heater, which had been a standard and safe practice before the recent change from steam to electric heating. Twelve people died and thirteen were injured.

== Relaunch in 1983 ==
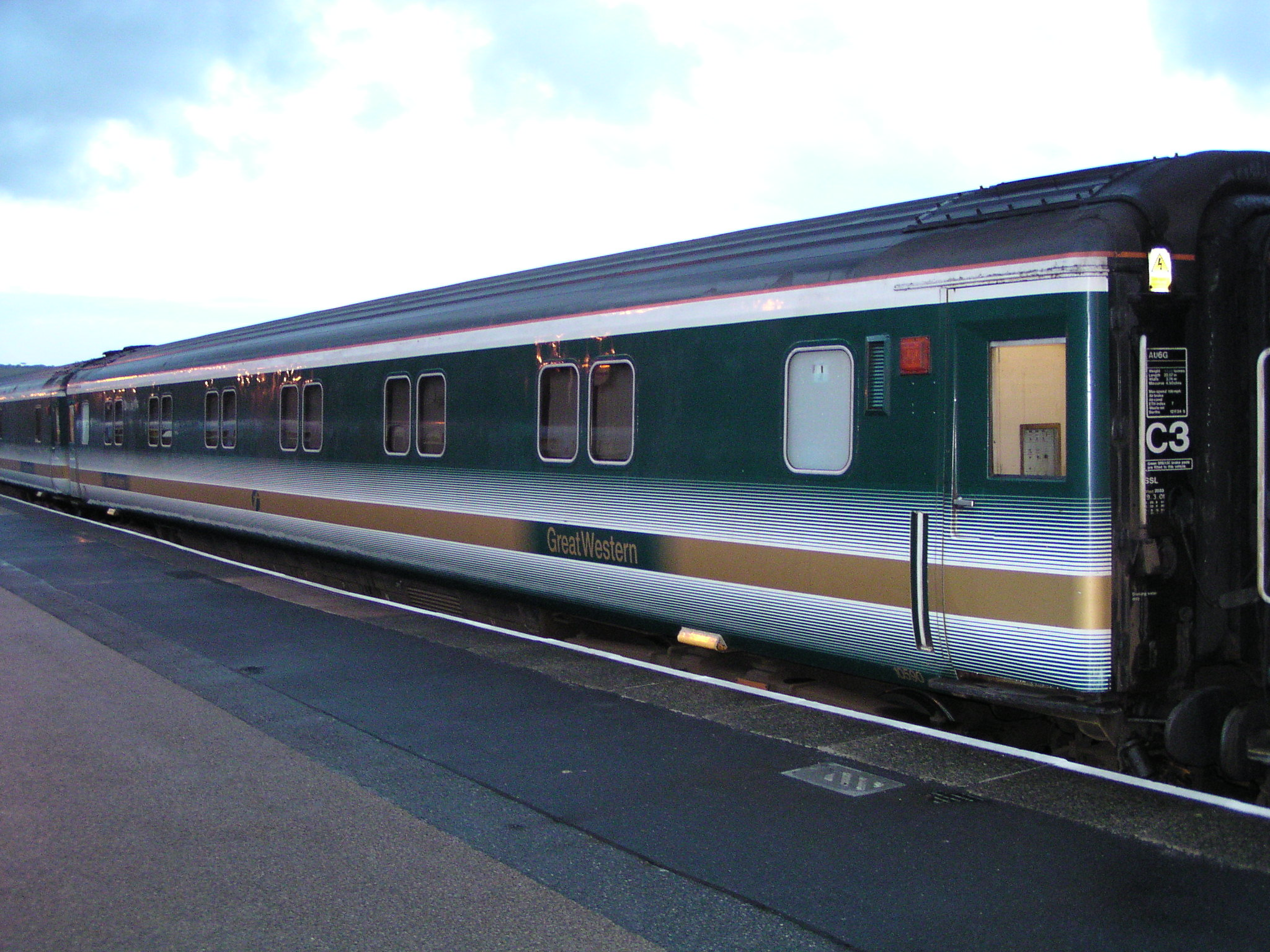
Great Western Trains livery, which continued to be used by First Great Western until 2008

On 11 July 1983 the Penzance sleeper was relaunched as the Night Riviera, designed to complement the long-established daytime Cornish Riviera Express. New Mark 3 air-conditioned sleeping cars were introduced with many safety features that had been lacking in the Mark 1 sleeping car that had caught fire at Taunton. These were the first on the route with controlled emission toilets, so discharge facilities were provided at Plymouth Laira and Penzance Long Rock depots where the carriages were serviced, although for a while the carriages were taken from Paddington to Willesden Depot for discharging as Old Oak Common was not initially equipped. A new pricing scheme was also introduced. Instead of paying a sleeping berth supplement on top of the fare for the journey, all-inclusive fares were introduced that were set at competitive rates. The seating carriages that formed part of the train were mainly Mark 2 carriages. The train by now was again leaving London at midnight, shown in the timetables as 23:59.

Privatisation of British Rail saw the service become part of the Great Western Trains franchise in February 1996 and the rolling stock was repainted into its green and white livery. Between 29 May 1995 and 26 September 1998 the service was diverted to London Waterloo to provide connection with Eurostar services. In December 1998 Great Western Trains was rebranded First Great Western.

When the Greater Western franchise was up for reletting in 2005, consideration was given to withdrawing the service. The service was retained, but from December 2006 the carriage detached at Plymouth was withdrawn as it typically only carried four passengers.

The stop at Bristol Temple Meads was also withdrawn, introducing the flexibility to divert the service during overnight engineering works. The Class 47s were replaced in 2004 by four Class 57s.

In 2006, former Virgin West Coast Mark 3 carriages replaced the Mark 2 carriages. They were refurbished by Railcare at Wolverton Works in 2008 when they were fitted with reclining seats in the first class and repainted in First Great Western's then blue livery.

In June 2012, with the Greater Western franchise scheduled for renewal the following year, the Secretary of State for Transport confirmed the service would continue to be subsidised.

During the course of 2017 and 2018 the entire train was refurbished. This included new standard class seats in the seated coach, and a wheelchair space and toilet. There was a refurbished buffet counter and lounge car. All the sleeper carriages were refurbished, and featured keycard locks, allowing passengers to unlock their own cabins for the first time, new lighting, and a wardrobe, along with underbed storage. There was also a disabled accessible berth and toilet added.

== Current operations ==
=== Route ===
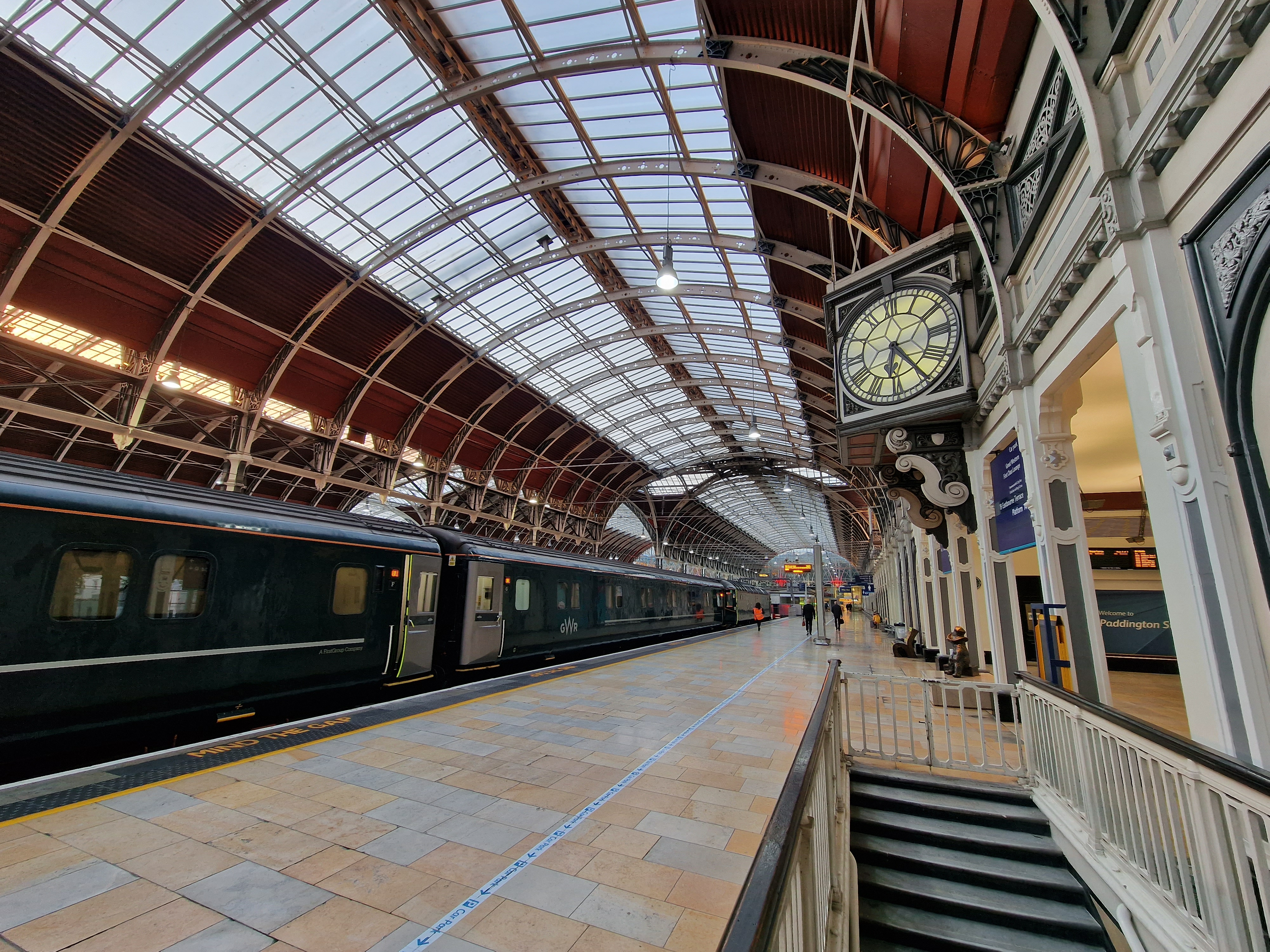
The sleeper arrives at Paddington in the early morning.

The westbound service operates with headcode 1C50, the return 1A50.

From London Paddington, the train stops first at Reading (to pick up only) then a long run without stops to Taunton. This allows it to use different routes between Reading and Taunton depending on engineering work or other blockades each night:

- the direct line through Westbury
- the Great Western Main Line and South Wales Main Line via Bristol Temple Meads
- the Great Western Main Line to Chippenham then via Trowbridge to rejoin the direct line at Fairwood Junction, Westbury.
- diverging at Heywood Road Junction, Westbury, via Trowbridge and Bristol.

In exceptional circumstances it can be diverted between Castle Cary and Exeter St Davids via Yeovil Pen Mill, Yeovil Junction and Honiton, not calling at Taunton and reversing at Exeter.

After Taunton it continues to Exeter St Davids, Newton Abbot and Plymouth, crossing into Cornwall and calling at Liskeard then most stations down the Cornish Main Line to Penzance.

The service from Penzance to London is similar but also calls at Totnes (and omits Lostwithiel and Hayle, and Par on Sunday only) and sets down only at Reading.

Sleeper berth passengers have the use of the first class lounge waiting facilities at Paddington that are usually reserved for first class passengers only. There are sleeper lounges for passengers at Truro and Penzance.

=== Rolling stock ===
The train is usually hauled by one of four dedicated Class 57 locomotives. These are rebuilt and re-engined Class 47s delivered in 2004.

There are two identical rakes of coaches, one operating each way each night. The seated coaches are usually at the Penzance end of the train. Passengers can board the train from 22:40 at Paddington, or remain on board at Paddington in the morning after arrival until 06:45. The train usually arrives and departs from Platform 1 at Paddington.

It usually consists of seven air-conditioned Mark 3 carriages, but is eight from Paddington on a Friday night, and from Penzance on a Sunday night. Coaches A and B are seated coaches, C is the buffet and lounge car and the rest are Sleeper Either Class cars. There are wheelchair spaces in coaches B and D. The sleeping cars are generally made up as six single compartments, and six double in each coach. However this can be altered if demand dictates. Passengers pay standard fares with a supplementary charge for a sleeping berth (a single berth is more expensive per person than twin bunk berths). Alternatively, they can purchase a berth inclusive fare. The coaches have not often been used on any other services. However, on summer Saturdays from 2015 until 2018 the seating coaches from a Night Riviera set operated a daytime service from St Erth to Exeter St Davids and back to Penzance. Additionally, a Night Riviera set operated a service to Oxford in February 2010.

After the closure of Old Oak Common TMD in December 2017, Penzance TMD became the home depot for maintenance of the rolling stock. At the London end, the stock is serviced at Reading TMD. A second Class 57 is attached to the rear of the London-bound train at Reading which then hauls the empty stock back to the depot, the reverse being done with the train from London.

In January 2022, FirstGroup called for tenders for electro-diesel locomotives to replace the Class 57s.

Class	Image	Type	Top speed		Number
Class	Image	Type	mph	km/h	Number
Class 57/6		Diesel locomotive	95	152	4
Mark 3		Passenger coach	110	177	8
Mark 3 Sleeper		Sleeping car	110	177	10

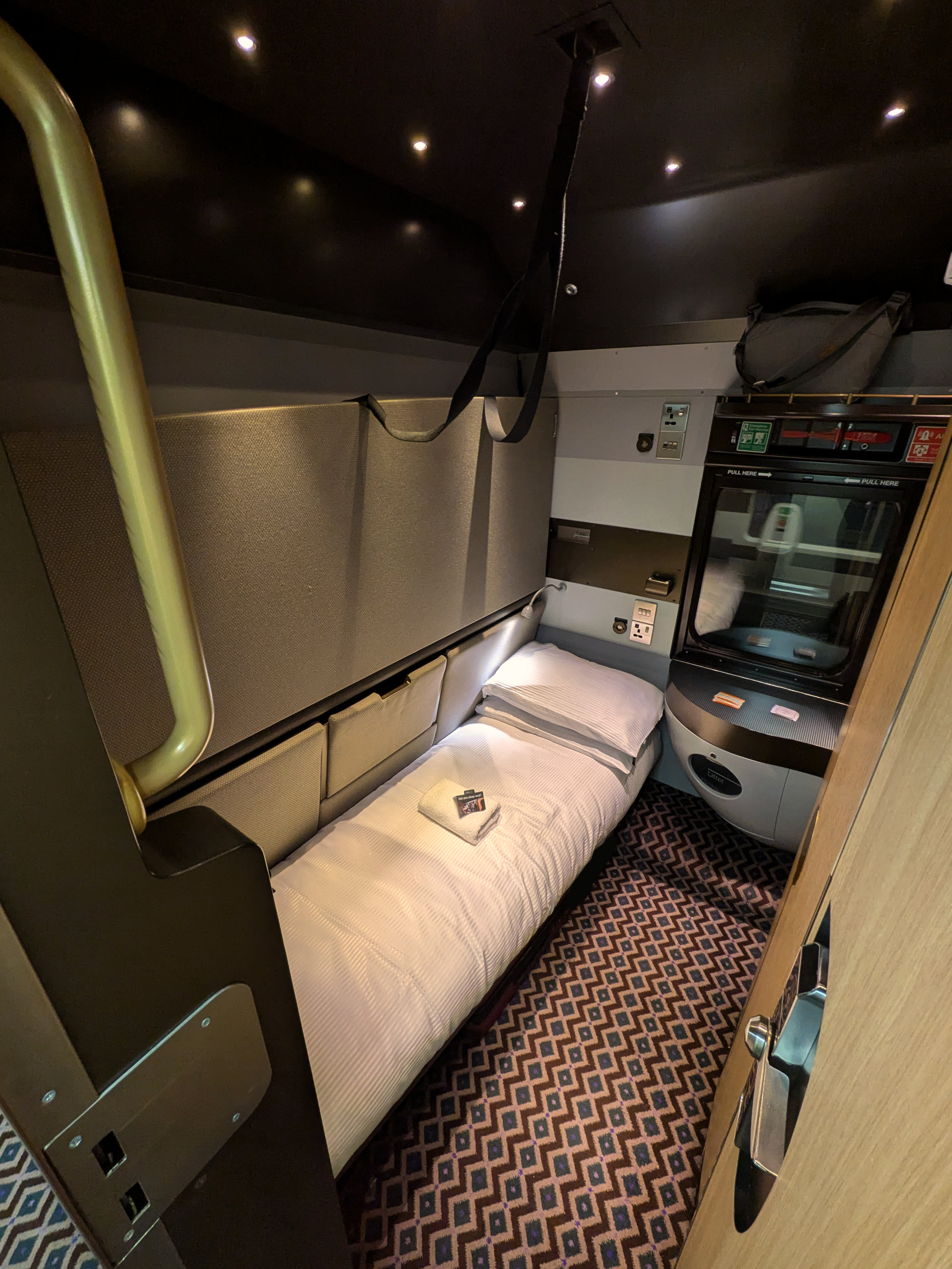
Standard cabin

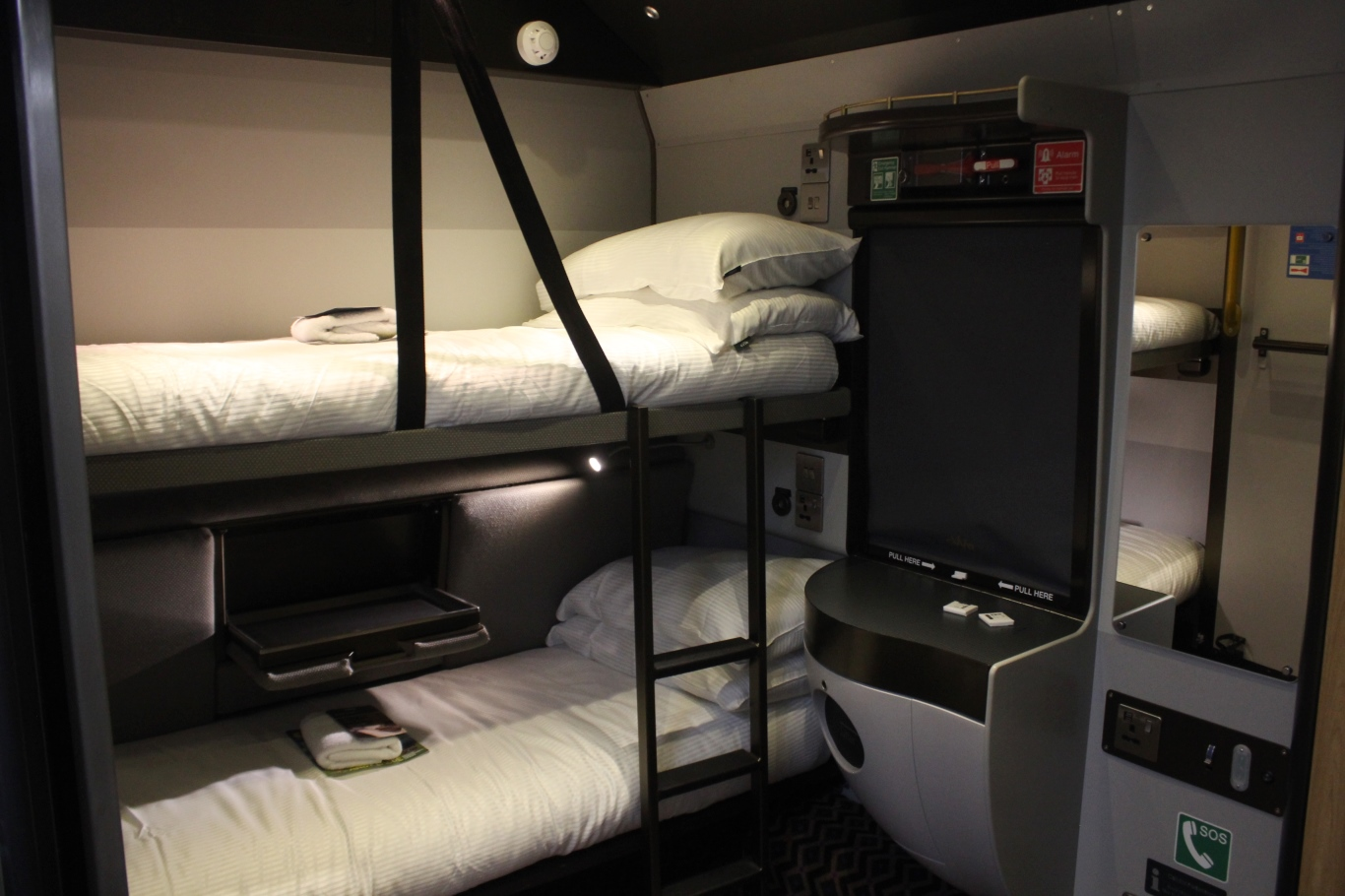
Accessible berth

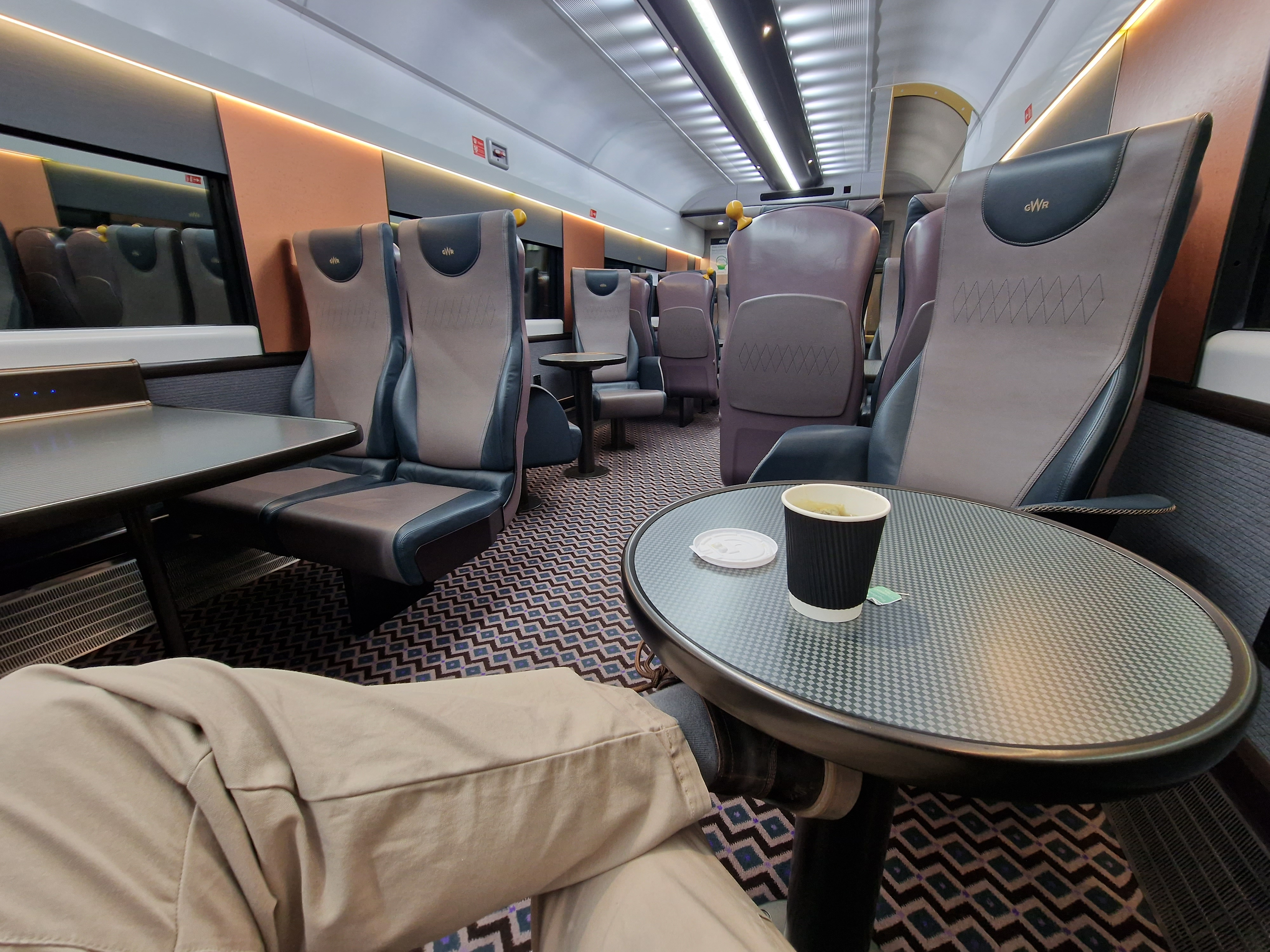
Bar carriage
