= Sea Trek =

Sea Trek may refer to:

- Sea Trek (diving system), an underwater helmet diving system
- Sea Trek (documentary), a TV documentary presented by Martha Holmes
- Sea Trek, a horse which won the Rebel Stakes in 1988
- Sea Trek 2001, a 2001 project to commemorate the exodus of Mormon pioneers from Europe during the 19th century
