= British Rail Mark 3 =

British railway passenger carriage

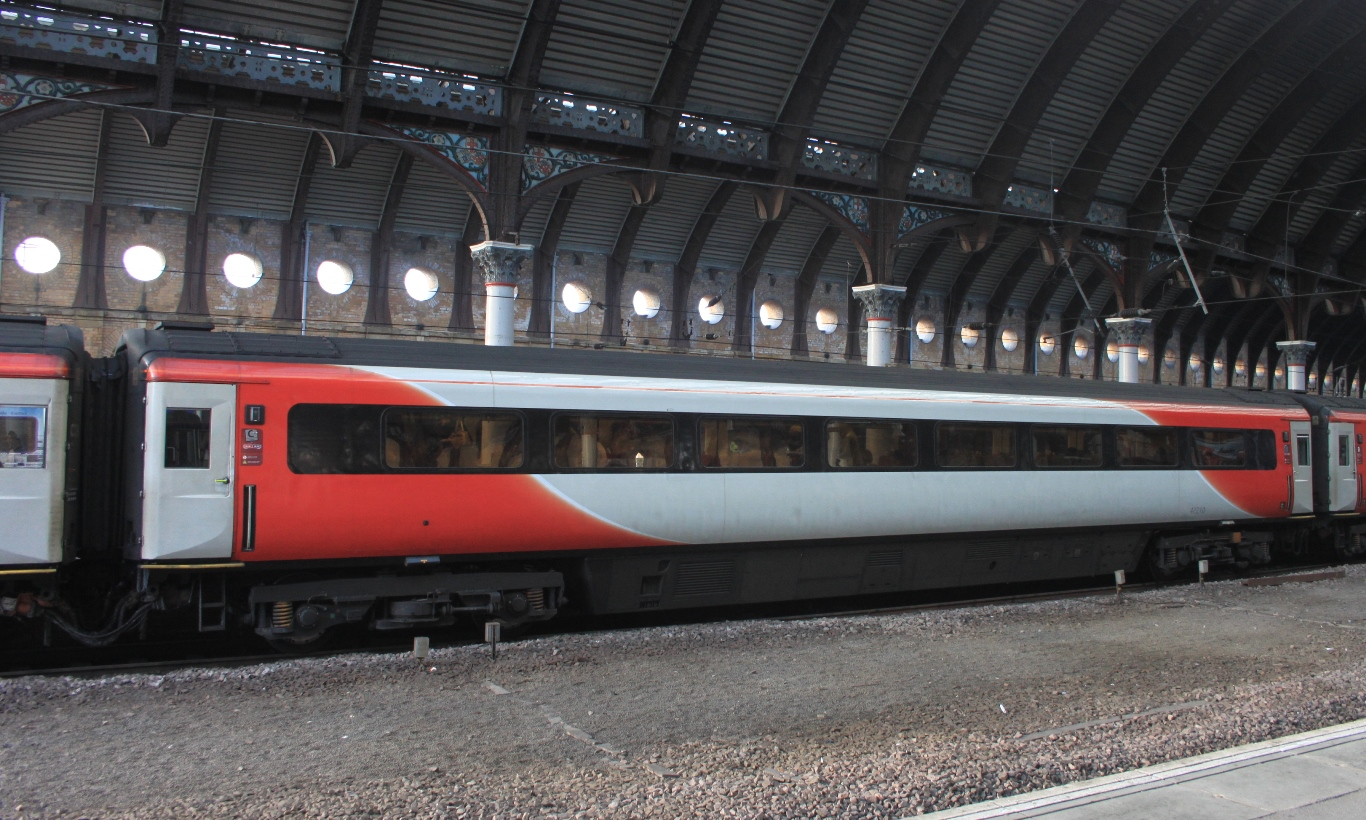
- Virgin Trains East Coast Trailer Standard No. 42210 at York

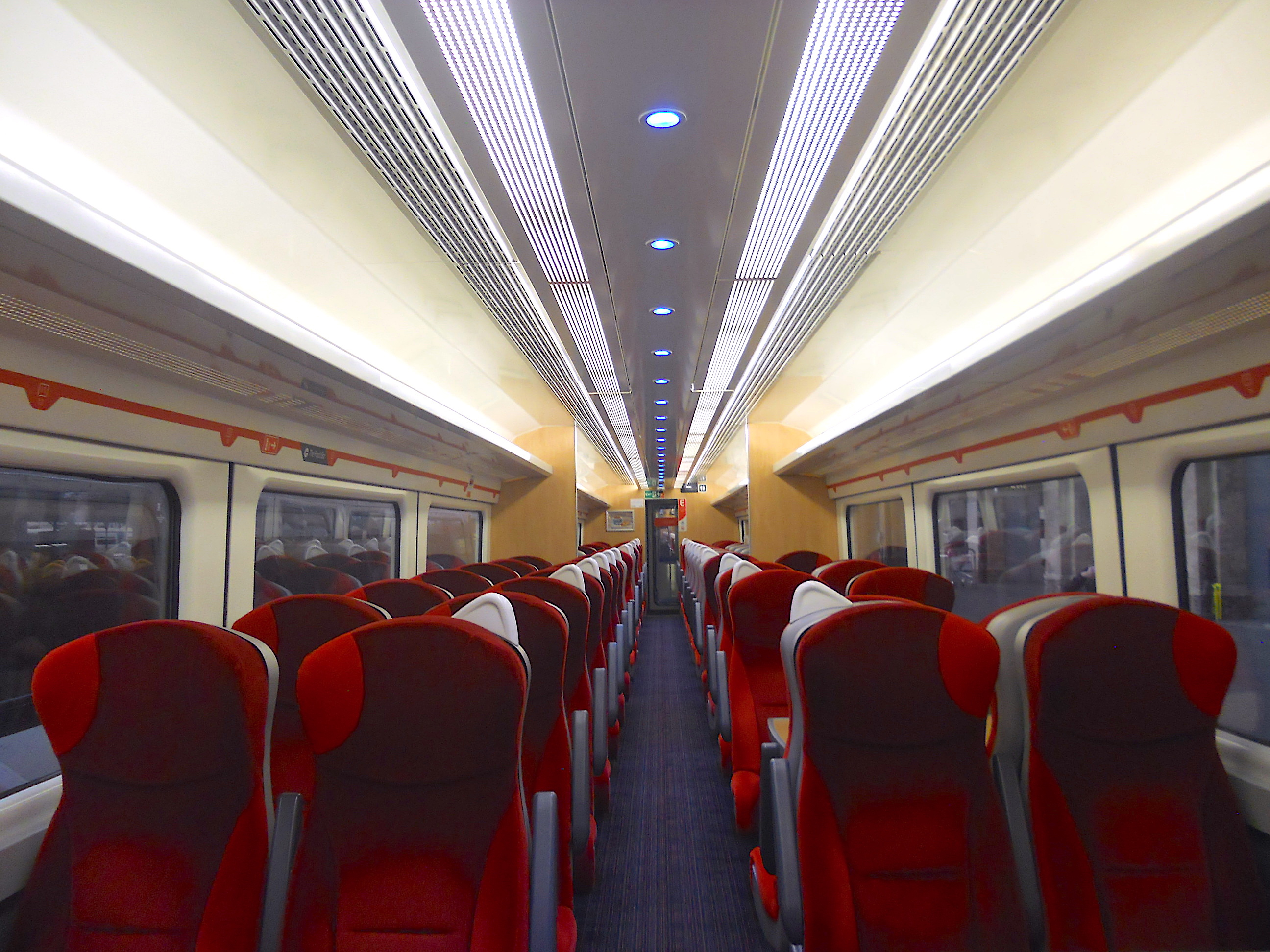
- The interior of Standard Class aboard an LNER refurbished Mark 3 TS vehicle
- In service: 1972–present
- Manufacturer: British Rail Engineering Limited
- Built at: Derby Litchurch Lane Works
- Constructed: 1972-1988
- Number built: 848
- Number scrapped: 300
- Capacity: As originally built (typical): First class: 48; Standard class: 74
- Operators: Great Western Railway; Network Rail; ScotRail; The Royal Scotsman; Royal Train
- Lines served: Great Western Main Line; Highland Main Line; Glasgow to Aberdeen Line; Edinburgh to Aberdeen Line; Aberdeen to Inverness Line

Specifications
- Car body construction: Steel fully integral, monocoque
- Car length: 23.0 m (75 ft 6 in)
- Doors: Hinged slam, centrally locked/automatic sliding doors, centrally locked
- Maximum speed: 125 mph (200 km/h)
- Power supply: 3-phase 415/240 V (Mark 3); 1,000 V DC (Mark 3A/B)
- Bogies: BREL BT10
- Braking systems: Disc, air operated
- Track gauge: 1,435 mm (4 ft 8 1/2 in) standard gauge

The British Rail Mark 3 is a type of passenger carriage developed in response to growing competition from airlines and the car in the 1970s. A variant of the Mark 3 became the rolling stock for the High Speed Train (HST).

Originally conceived as locomotive-hauled coaching stock, the first coaches built were for the prototype HST in 1972. Production coaches entered service between 1975 and 1988, and multiple-unit designs based on the Mark 3 bodyshell continued to be built until the early 1990s. Most of the surviving fleet of the Mark 3 and its derivatives were still in revenue service on the British railway network in 2020, however, as of 7 April 2021, 300 carriages have been sent for scrap.

== Introduction ==
Under the chairmanship of Stanley Raymond, it was decided to reduce journey times further on long-distance trains by increasing line speed to 125 mph (200 km/h), where practical – the maximum considered possible on Britain's Victorian-age railways. At the end of 1968, proposals were submitted to the Commercial and Operating Departments of British Rail for a new fleet of third-generation standard coaching stock, designed to run at 125 mph.

The rapid development required for the HST in 1969 made the Mark 3 coach design the obvious choice for that train and, in 1972, the first ten Mark 3 coaches were built for the prototype HST.

== Construction ==
The Mark 3 looks similar to Mark 2D, 2E and 2F coaches, but is of a completely different design. It has a ridged roof and under-frame skirt, compared with a smooth roof and visible below-frame equipment on the Mark 2.

The bodyshell is 75 feet (23 m) long, almost 10 feet (3.0 m) longer than the Mark 2, of full monocoque construction with an all-welded mild steel stressed skin, and has a reputation for its exceptional strength and crashworthiness. An important advance over its predecessor was the adoption of secondary air suspension between the body and the bogies, giving an exceptionally smooth ride. The bogies, classified BT10 (BT5 on the prototype vehicles), were designed specifically for the Mark 3 and have coil-spring primary suspension with hydraulic dampers, enabling a maximum speed of 125 mph (200 km/h) – the Mark 2 is limited to 100 mph (160 km/h). Disc brakes in place of the Mark 2 clasp brakes completed the engineering package enabling – in conjunction with wheel slip protection (WSP) – efficient deceleration from 125 mph and almost silent brake operation.

Ancillaries, such as electrical and air-conditioning systems, were grouped together in discrete modules housed behind an aerodynamic skirting between the bogies; on the Mark 2, these were mounted above and below the passenger seating area. The lighting and air-conditioning fittings were for the first time integrated into the ceiling panels. Other new features were the pneumatically operated automatic gangway doors triggered by pressure pads under the floor. From 1993, after fatal falls from moving trains, a central door-locking system operated by the train guard was installed to protect the passenger operated slam doors.

The main difference between the HST vehicles and the loco-hauled Mark 3A relates to electrical supply arrangements. HST coaches take an industrial voltage/frequency 3-phase supply directly from an auxiliary alternator in the power car to supply on-board equipment such as air conditioning; loco-hauled vehicles take a standard 1000 V DC or single-phase AC train heat supply from the locomotive and convert it through motor generator units under the floor. These convert the train supply to 3-phase 415/240 V 50 Hz AC to power air conditioning and other ancillaries. The two types are non-interconnectable in service conditions. The other main difference is the lack of buffers on HST coaches.

The later Mark 3B build provided first class loco-hauled vehicles for the West Coast Main Line. These are similar to Mark 3As, but have an improved motor alternator unit with compound-wound motor and seating derived from the Advanced Passenger Train (APT).

== Prototype ==
Ten coaches were constructed to run between a pair of Class 41 power cars as the prototype HST, exploring different seating and layout options for first and standard class passengers, and evaluating different designs of catering facilities. In 1973 the prototype HST was evaluated as an 8-coach formation. The two spare coaches, 2903 and 2904, were rebuilt and redeployed in the Royal Train, where they remain.

== Development ==
Initial plans for a large fleet for almost all InterCity services were amended prior to construction to provide stock for the planned HST fleet, resulting in a much smaller fleet of loco-hauled coaches for the West Coast Main Line. A much reduced number of coaches were manufactured, requiring many Mark 2D, 2E and 2F coaches to remain in service.

The table below lists manufacturing variants as built, showing the quantity of each type/designation and original running numbers.

| Mark | Built | Features | Numbers Built : No, Type, (Original Number Series) | |
|---|---|---|---|---|
| Mark 3 | 1972 | Prototypes | 1 x RSB (10000); 1 x RUK (10100) | 4 x FO (11000-11003); 4 x TSO (12000-12003) |
| Mark 3 | 1976-82 | Standard HST stock (no buffers) | 37 x TRSB (40001-40037); 58 x TRUB (40300-40357); 20 x TRUK (40501-40520) | 167 x TF (41003-41169); 339 x TS (42003-42342); 102 x TGS (44000-44101) |
| Mark 3A | 1975-84 | Standard loco-hauled stock | 28 x RFB (10001-10028); 120 x SLEP (10500-10619); 88 x SLE (10646-10733) | 60 x FO (11004-11063); 165 x TSO (12004-12168); 2 x Royal (2914–2915) |
| Mark 3B | 1985-88 | Loco-hauled stock with improved interior lighting diffusers, InterCity 80 seats and other upgrades | 38 x FO (11064-11101); 3 x BFO (17173-17175); 52 x DVT (82101-82152) T4 bogies | 2 x Royal (2922–2923) |
| Mark 3B International | 1986-88 | Revised version slightly different body profile built to promote export orders. | 11 x International (99519-99529); Eventually exported to Ireland. | |

See British Rail coach type codes for the meaning of RSB, TRUK, BFO etc.

== Usage ==
Since 1977, the Royal Train has included some specially-equipped Mark 3 coaches.

Mark 3s and multiple units derived from them remain in service primarily with HSTs, Class 150s, Class 320s and Class 769s. These were refurbished when their operators were privatised, with all except East Midlands Trains' receiving new seats between 2006 and 2009.

The introduction by Virgin CrossCountry of 220/221 Voyagers in the early 2000s rendered many Mark 3s surplus. After periods of storage, all subsequently returned to service with other operators.

The introduction by Virgin Trains of Class 390 Pendolinos in the early 2000s resulted in the withdrawal of the locomotive hauled Mark 3s. Some were cascaded to One to replace Mark 2s on the Great Eastern Main Line, while a few replaced Mark 2s on the Night Riviera. Most were placed in store at Long Marston. Many subsequently returned to service, both as locomotive hauled coaches with Arriva Trains Wales, Chiltern Railways as well as being converted for use with HSTs by Grand Central and CrossCountry. This required modifications to the coupling mechanisms and electrical systems to make them compatible with Class 43 power cars.

Mark 3 sleeping cars are used on the Night Riviera services.

Virgin Trains retained one complete Mark 3 set. It was initially used to cover peak-time London Euston to Birmingham services while the Pendolinos underwent modifications, but later covering the loss of 390033, written off after the Grayrigg derailment in 2007. In July 2009, it was refurbished and repainted at Doncaster Works in the same style as the Pendolino and Voyager fleets, but with the British Rail seats and interior fittings retained. This set was nicknamed the "Pretendolino" by enthusiasts. It was transferred to Abellio Greater Anglia in November 2014. In 2016 it moved to TransPennine Express to be used as a crew trainer in the lead-up to the introduction of Mark 5As.

=== Sewage discharge ===
Legally in the UK, train operators are allowed to discharge up to 25 litres of untreated waste at a time on to the track and the discharge from each toilet flush is considerably less than this. Most Mark 3 carriages have no retention tanks, discharging onto the track via a U-bend/pipe near the bogies, and in the 2000s both the RMT trade union and politicians were concerned at the environmental impact of this legacy issue. The problem was first raised in 2003 after Railtrack staff at Nottingham abandoned local clean-up and then track maintenance procedures due to an excessive build-up of sewage waste in the area. In 2006 the RMT agreed waste tank and clean-out developments at Northern Rail's Heaton TMD in 2006 with GNER, and new clean-out procedures at all other depots, to solve an ongoing dispute over the previous 18 months.

By 2011, the European Union had begun a formal investigation to see whether trains composed of such carriages were breaking EU environmental and health laws, although the Environment Agency confirmed that train companies claimed special exemptions to dump waste on the track. In 2013, Transport Minister Susan Kramer branded the practice "utterly disgusting" and called on the industry to take action. ATOC responded by stating that, as all new vehicles had to be fitted with compliant toilet tanks, withdrawal of the HSTs by the end of 2017 would solve the problem. The use of HSTs without retention tanks continued after the end of 2017, but sets being transferred to ScotRail and shortened HST sets retained by GWR are being fitted with retention tanks. ScotRail operated brown waste discharging sets until the COVID-19 pandemic facilitated cuts to service in April 2020.

== Train formations ==
=== HST vehicles ===
==== Original formation ====
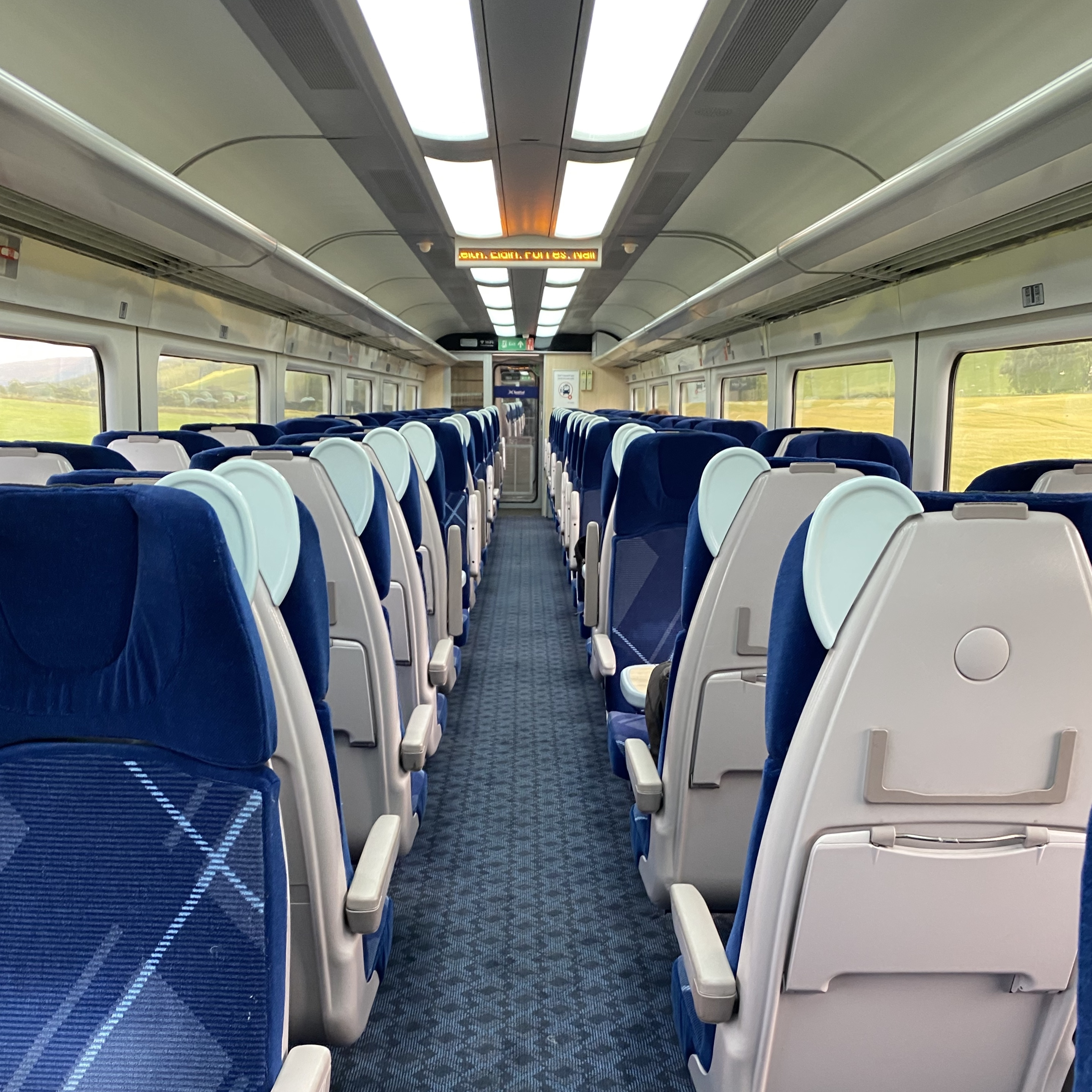
The interior of a refurbished ScotRail Mark 3 Standard Class with electronic destination displays

The original coaches were delivered in HST sets for Western Region (Class 253) with Trailer First (TF), Trailer Restaurant Unclassified Kitchen (TRUK), Trailer Second (TS), and Trailer Buffet Second (TRSB) cars in the formation TF-TF-TRUK-TS-TRSB-TS-TS. Complaints from guards about engine noise in the guards' compartments in the power cars led to the Trailer Guard Second (TGS) in 1980, based on the TS but with the end vestibule and one seating bay replaced by a guard's compartment. This replaced the last TS in all sets from 1980 onwards. Sets delivered for Eastern and Scottish Regions (Class 254) contained eight coaches, originally in the formation TF-TF-TRUK-TS-TS-TRSB-TS-TS.

The TRUK cars were quickly replaced by a TS on the Western Region and most had been replaced on the Eastern Region by 1985 (many later rebuilt into loco-hauled buffet cars). TRUB cars (Trailer Restaurant Unclassified Buffet) were built from 1978 to replace the TRUK cars, these were reclassified as TRFB (Trailer Restaurant First Buffet) from 1985 on the Eastern and London Midland Regions and from 1989/90 on the Western Region. The original interiors were fitted out fully carpeted with InterCity 70 seats. First Class had orange and red stripes on both carpet and seating, whilst Standard Class had a blue and green scheme. From May 1987 onwards, both HST and Mark 3 loco hauled sets were repainted and refurbished into the Intercity swallow livery.

==== Previous formations ====
Virgin CrossCountry proposed operating HST sets in shortened 2 power car and 5 trailer formations to be known as Challenger sets painted in the silver and red livery. This would give the trains better acceleration, similar to the Voyager units. Approval was not granted for this however. Cross Country previously ran 7 coach HST sets (with 2 Powercars) until 2023 when they were withdrawn from service.

==== Current formations ====
Following the May 2019 timetable change, GWR now run exclusively "Castle" sets formed of 4 coaches and 2 power cars. ScotRail have operated 4 coach sets with 2 power cars, on Scottish InterCity routes since 2018. Most ScotRail sets will be extended to 5 coaches.

=== Hauled stock ===
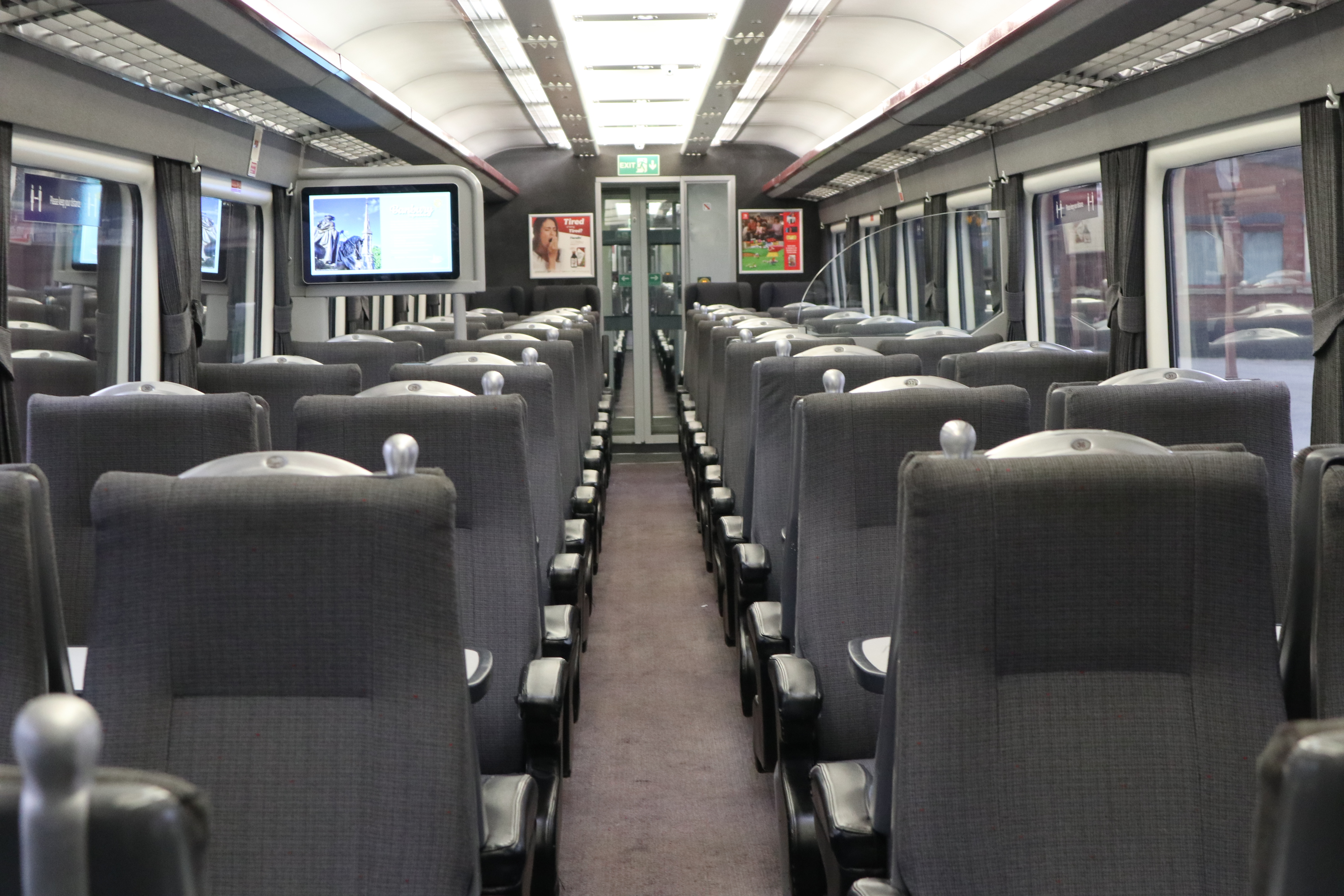
The interior of Chiltern Railways refurbished Mark 3 with the original InterCity 70 seats

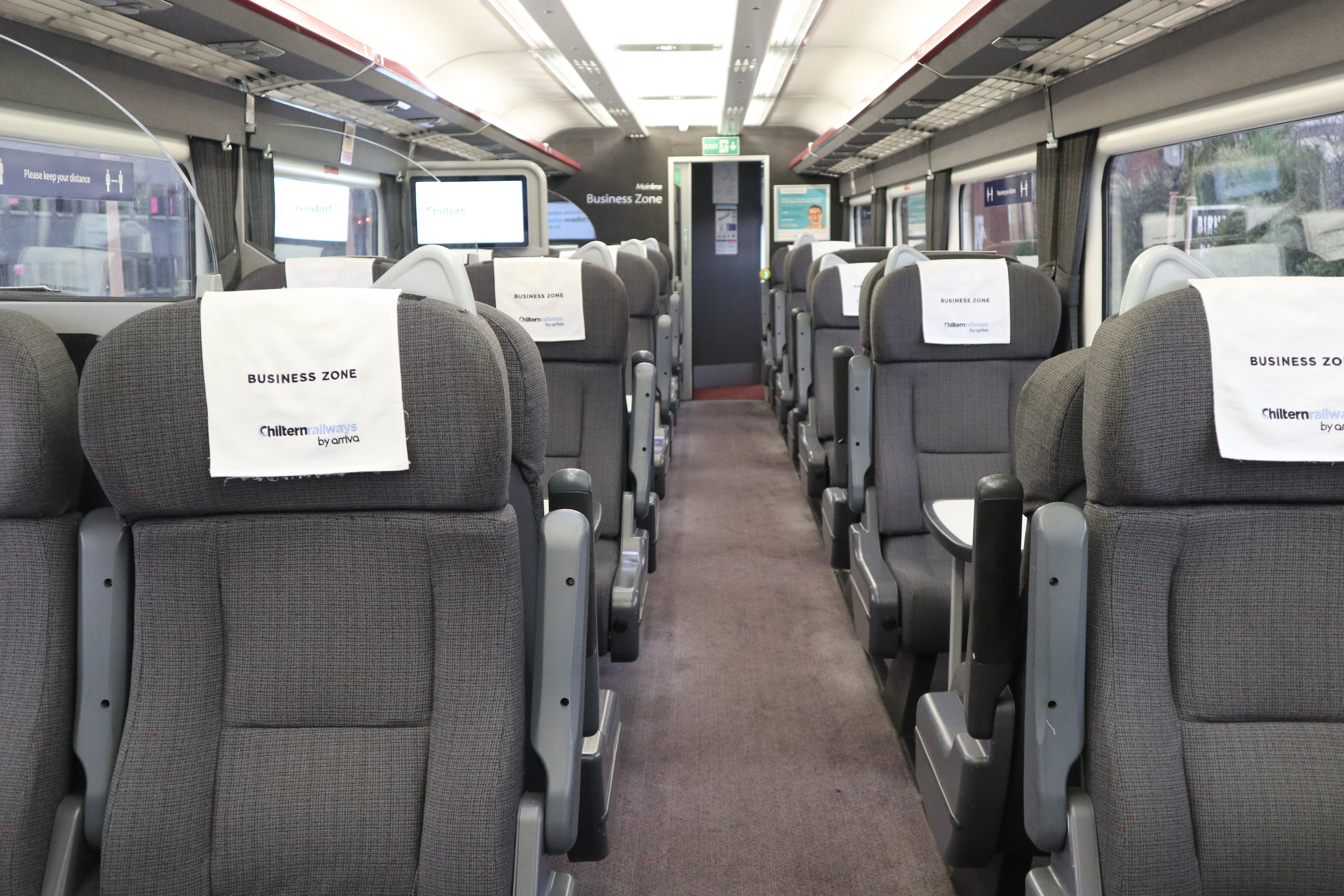
The interior of Business Class aboard a Chiltern Railways refurbished Mark 3

Mark 3A coaches were deployed on West Coast Main Line expresses out of Euston to bring the three main long-distance routes from London up to the same standard. Initial variants were Second Open (TSO) and First Open (FO). Catering and sleeper vehicles continued to be Mark 1 stock until the introduction of Restaurant Buffet (RUB) vehicles in 1979-80 and the sleeper (SLEP) vehicles in 1981–82. In 1988 the process was completed with the elimination of Mk 1 parcels vehicles and their replacement by Mk 3-derived Driving Van Trailers, making the WCML push-pull.

Scottish Region push-pull services were initially made up of four TSO and one FO Mark 3A coaches with a Mark 2F DBSO. The FO was later converted to a Composite Open (CO) by the declassification of half a coach and installation of a partition between the two classes and an SO was removed. These vehicles were removed from the Scottish regional routes in 1989 when they were replaced with Class 158 multiple units.

Chiltern Railways employed several rakes of Mark 3 carriages, hauled by Class 68 locomotives in push-pull configuration with Mark 3 Driving Van Trailers. These Mark 3 carriages were extensively refurbished and modernised with the following enhancements:

- Application of new Chiltern Railways Silver Mainline livery based on the former, defunct Wrexham and Shropshire livery of two-tone silver
- Automatic plug doors in place of the original slam doors (except for the two doors adjacent to the buffet car counter, which are no longer for public use)
- Large doorway vestibule areas
- Installation of economical controlled emission toilets with retention tanks
- Retrimmed carpets in new trim
- Retrimmed seats in new trim
- New dado side panels and repainted wall end coverings
- Power sockets at each seat
- Improved ceiling mounted LED interior saloon lighting diffusers

The Driving Van Trailers were modified with diesel generators to provide Electric Train Supply to the coaches when the locomotive was not running, such as when in terminus stations and when stabled.

Abellio Greater Anglia operated the Mark 3 carriages hauled by Class 90 locomotives in push-pull configuration with Mark 3 Driving Van Trailers on the West Anglia Main Line. In 2014, Greater Anglia refurbished their Mark 3 carriages; these carriages were refurbished with the following enhancements:

- Application of new Greater Anglia livery – a white bodyside with black window surrounds and red highlighted doors
- Installation of economical controlled emission toilets with retention tanks
- Retrimmed carpets in new trim
- Retrimmed seats in new trim
- New dado side panels and repainted wall end coverings
- An increase in Standard Class seating capacity by adding another eight seats to each TSO carriage, thus creating 80 seats per a TSO vehicle
- Removing the kitchen equipment and 24 First Class seats in the former Restaurant Car vehicles, replacing them with 54 Standard Class seats
- Power sockets at each seat
- Improved ceiling mounted LED interior saloon lighting diffusers

The coaches typically had 74 or 76 seats (80 seats on InterCity Anglia) in Standard Class with a 2+2 layout or 46 to 48 seats in First Class with a 2+1 layout. Abellio Greater Anglia used a mix of eight, nine and ten coaches in their sets up until their retirement in 2020

== Manchester Pullman ==
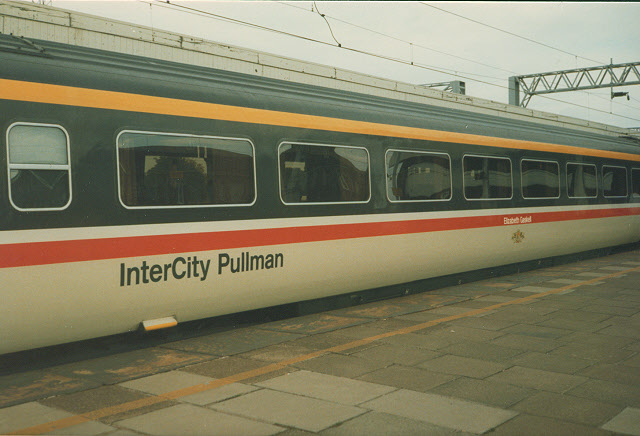
An InterCity Mark 3 Pullman coach at Nuneaton in 1985

Mark 3 carriages were used on the Manchester Pullman from May 1985, with a batch of Mark 3b carriages being built at Derby as Intercity Pullman cars, some named. This was part of a revival of the Pullman brand by InterCity, with Merseyside and Yorkshire services being launched on the same day.

== Entertainment carriages ==
In 2009 First Great Western introduced 'entertainment carriages' with at-seat television screens known as Volo TV. The system, which FGW claimed was a "world first", was fitted to Coach D in Standard Class. The service, originally charged for, eventually became free, although users either had to provide their own headphones (standard 3.5mm stereo mini-jack plug) or purchase a pair from the on-board Express Cafe for £1.50.

In addition to radio and video feeds, a GPS train-location screen allowed passengers to check and track train progress. For this purpose an aerial had been fitted to the roof of these coaches. With the advent of portable media devices and tablet computers, the Volo TV service was discontinued in 2014.

== Sleeping carriages ==
In 1979, British Rail ordered 236 Mark 3 sleeper carriages. Because of cost overruns partly caused by more stringent regulations in the wake of the Taunton sleeping car fire the order was cut back to 207. However even this was too many, as by the time they were delivered British Rail were withdrawing sleeper services.

In 1987, ten were leased to Danish State Railways while in 1994, three were sold to Swiss bogie manufacturer Schweizerische Industrie Gesellschaft for tilt train testing. In 1995 Porterbrook experimentally converted one to a day carriage. GNER purchased 13 with the intention of converting to High Speed Train carriages, but the project was aborted.

Five were converted to generator vans for the aborted Nightstar service. One of these was purchased by UK Rail Leasing for use as a carriage heater at its Leicester depot in 2016. English Welsh & Scottish investigated converting Mark 3s for use on high speed freight trains.

== Future ==
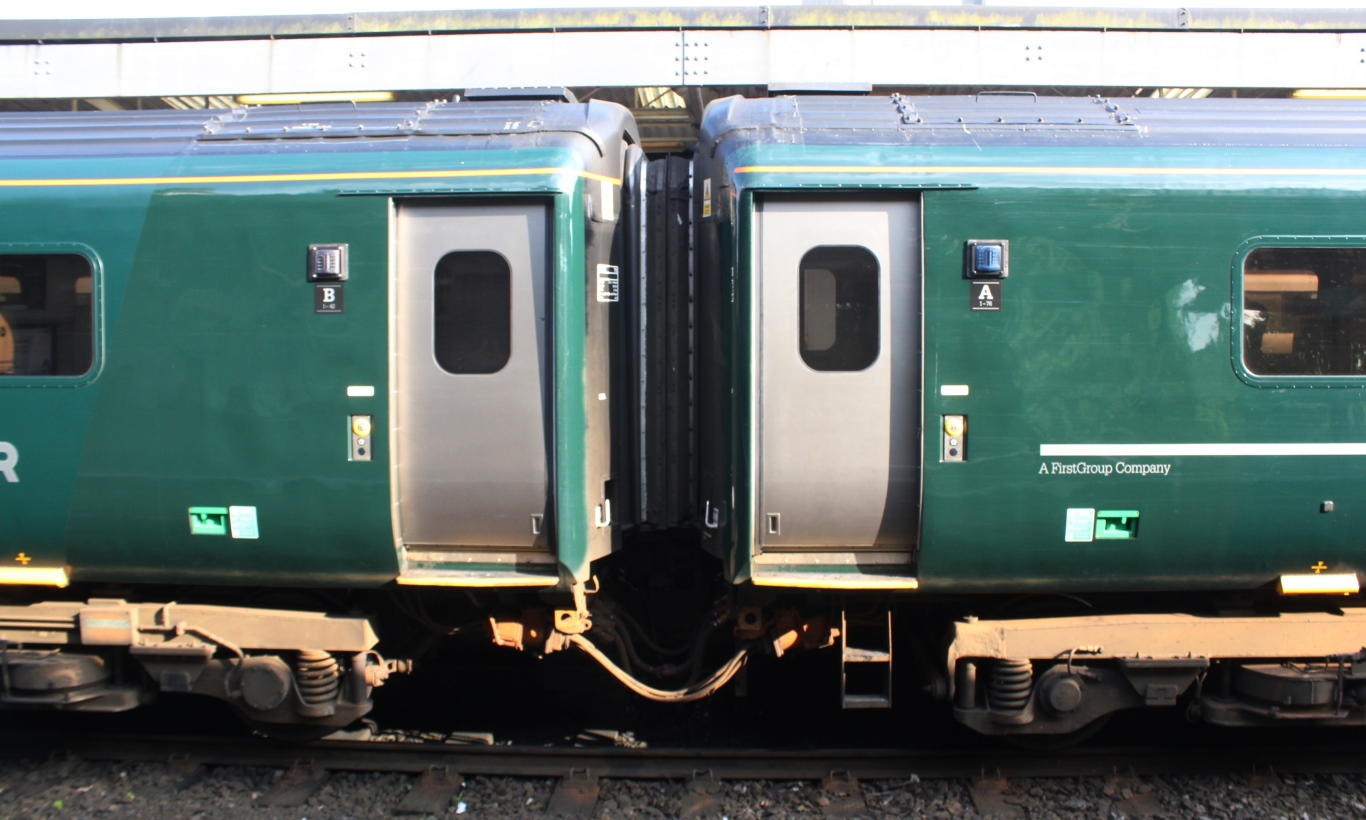
Great Western Railway Mark 3s fitted with power doors in 2018

Many of the Mark 3s were scheduled to be withdrawn by 2020. Great Western Railway and London North Eastern Railway sets were replaced by Class 800, 801 and 802 sets.

The East Midlands Railway Mark 3s were withdrawn in May 2021. Former Great Western Railway Mark 3s were leased to ScotRail from 2018 for use on Edinburgh/Glasgow to Aberdeen/Inverness and Aberdeen to Inverness, routes. Great Western began trials of shortened HST sets with new power-operated external doors in 2018, and intend to run 11 of these 'Castle' sets on local services on the main lines.

The Caledonian Sleeper Mark 3 sleeper sets were withdrawn in October 2019. Grand Central then withdrew their Mark 3s in 2017. These were transferred to East Midlands Trains.

Great Western Railway and London North Eastern Railway withdrew their Mark 3 sets in 2019, with GWR reforming many Mark 3 sets as 4 car refurbished "Castle" sets.

Abellio Greater Anglia withdrew its Mark 3 sets in March 2020.

Chiltern Railways phased out their sets of Mark 3 coaches in February 2026. They were replaced by CAF's Mark 5A coaches previously operated by TransPennine Express.

== Preservation ==
Some former Mark 3 sleeping carriages were sold to railway preservation organisations for use as volunteer staff accommodation vehicles, and a range of additional vehicles have been preserved at a number of heritage railways, including HST vehicles. Others have been acquired for charter work on the main line.

A Buffet Mark 3 has been preserved at the National Railway Museum site in Shildon since March 2020.

== Multiple units based on the Mark 3 ==
The Mark 3 design proved to be highly adaptable and formed the basis of BR's Second Generation multiple unit fleet, introduced from the early 1980s, with the following classes having Mark-3-based bodyshells:

- DMU Classes
  - Class 150
  - Class 210
- AC EMU Classes
  - Class 317
  - Class 318
  - Class 319
  - Class 320
  - Class 321
  - Class 322
  - Class 325
- DC EMU Classes
  - Class 442
  - Class 455
  - Class 456
- Bi-mode EDMU Classes
  - Class 768
  - Class 769
  - Class 799

The cars for Classes 150, 210, 317, 318, 319, 320, 321, 322, 325, 455 and 456 units are built to a shorter 20 m 'suburban' design. Those for Class 442 are 23 m and are very similar to the Mark 3 coach. The main visual difference is the swing plug automatic doors rather than the traditional manual "slam-doors".

The Class 153 and Class 155, while of the "Sprinter family", are built by British Leyland and have no connection with the Mark 3, neither does the Class 156, built by Metro-Cammell.

The final batch of "Sprinters" of Class 158 (some rebuilt as Class 159) are of a different design built from aluminium extrusions. Its design being intermediate between that of the Mark 3 and the Networker (train).

Nine 450 Class DMUs were built at Derby Litchurch Lane Works for Northern Ireland Railways using Mark 3 bodyshells and Mark 1 underframes, together with refurbished power units and traction motors, recovered from the former Class 70 units.

The last Mark-3-based EMUs built are the Class 325 EMUs built for Royal Mail in 1995.

== Mark 3 coaches overseas ==
=== Ireland ===
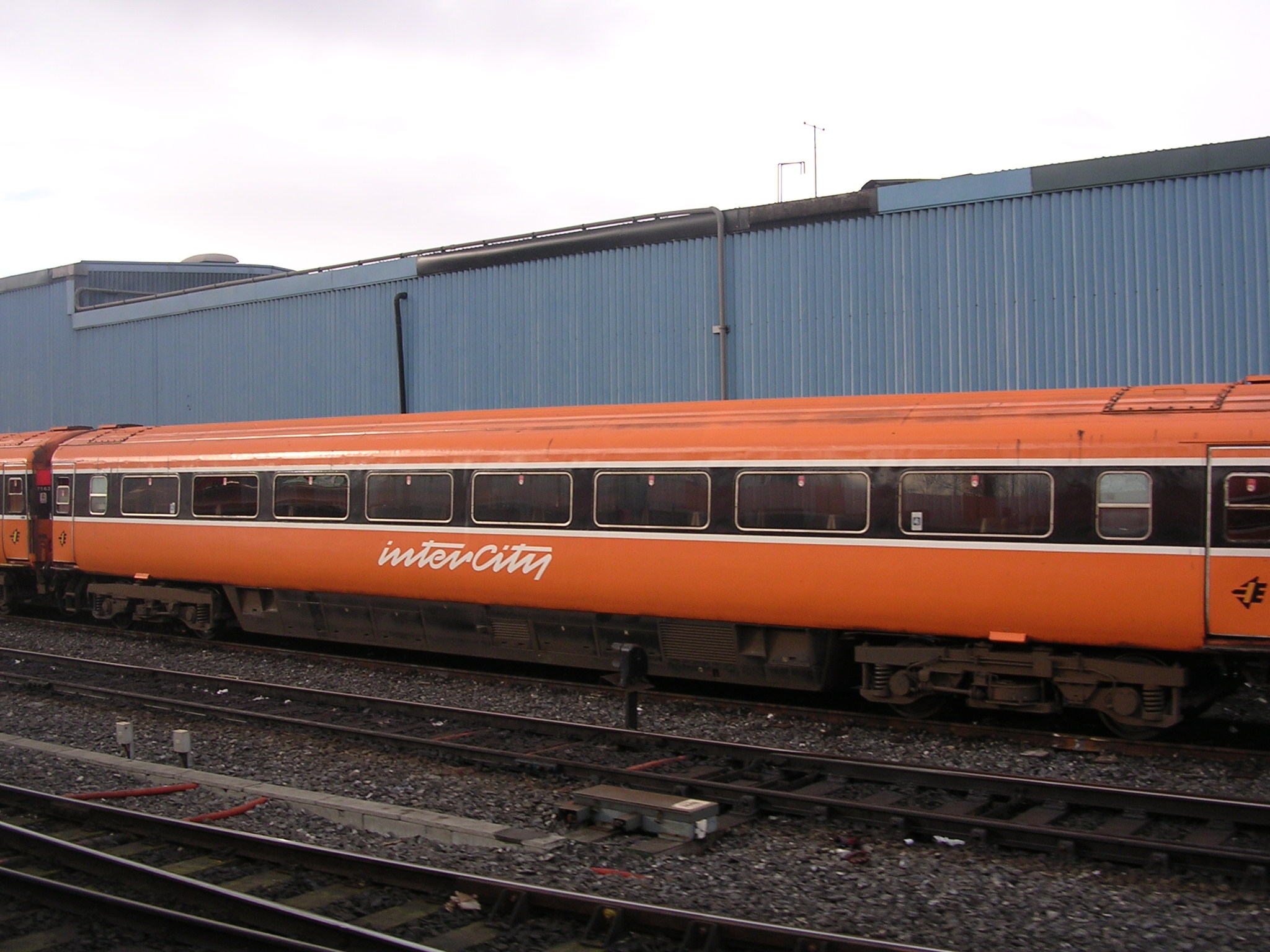
Iarnród Éireann Mark 3 at Dublin Heuston in InterCity livery

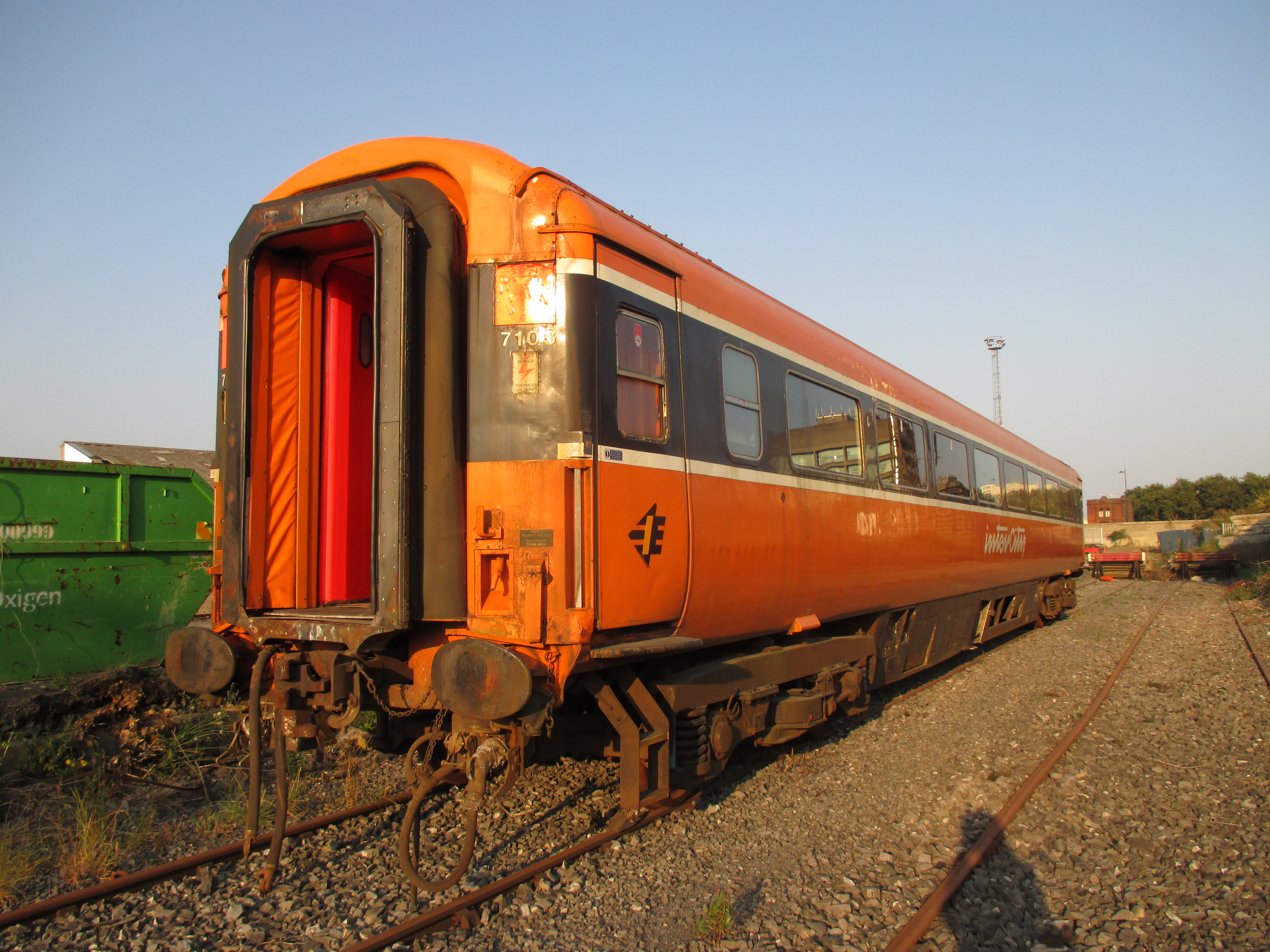
Iarnród Éireann BREL Mark 3 carriage at the North Wall, Dublin, 2014

The Republic of Ireland's national rail operator, Iarnród Éireann, ordered Mark 3 carriages built between 1980 and 1989, with bogies for the Irish gauge of 1600 mm (5 ft 3 in). The fleet consisted of 124 Mark 3 and nine Mark 3A Internationals, which worked only the Dublin–Galway service, branded Cú na Mara or Hound of the Seas as it was a coast-to-coast route.

Throughout the 1990s and 2000s they were the backbone of the Irish InterCity rolling stock.

They were built with automatic plug doors, which initially caused some concern as additional time and resources were required to perfect them. The design was later used on the Class 442 "Wessex Electrics". Most of the fleet was air-conditioned, except for a small number of coaches built as outer-suburban stock, which ran in push-pull configuration. A number of coaches were first class, and there were several dining cars and five driving van trailers (DVTs) that included passenger seating. There were also a number of accompanying generator vans to supply power.

In 2006–07, Irish Mark 4 carriages were introduced on the Dublin-Cork route, with the Mark 3 coaches displaced to other InterCity routes.

In 2008, Iarnród Éireann began taking delivery of 22000 Class railcars, which led to withdrawal of all Mark 3 coaches. The type's final service was a Dublin-Cork relief train on 21 September 2009.

Efforts were made to sell the 130 carriages but some were still stored in various locations. During 2015 some carriages were refurbished for use on the Grand Hibernian luxury train, which began operating on 30 August 2016 and ceased operating in 2020 due to the COVID-19 pandemic - however, the final cancellation was announced only in 2021. A year later the carriages were transported from Ireland, and in the upcoming time redesigned as Belmond's new luxury train Britannic Explorer, which is scheduled to run from July 2025.

Between 2013 and 2014, most of the Iarnród Éireann Mark 3s were scrapped at Waterford, Dundalk, and Adelaide Depot in Belfast.

=== Denmark ===
In 1987, ten sleepers were leased to Danish State Railways. They returned in November 1998 and placed in store at MoD Kineton.

=== Mexico ===
In early August 2023, 11 carriages were exported to Mexico, along with three Class 43 power cars, for use on the Tren Interoceánico, a service operating in the Isthmus of Tehuantepec. They arrived in early September 2023.

=== Switzerland ===
In 1994, three sleepers were sold to Swiss bogie manufacturer Schweizerische Industrie Gesellschaft for tilt train testing.

== Gallery ==
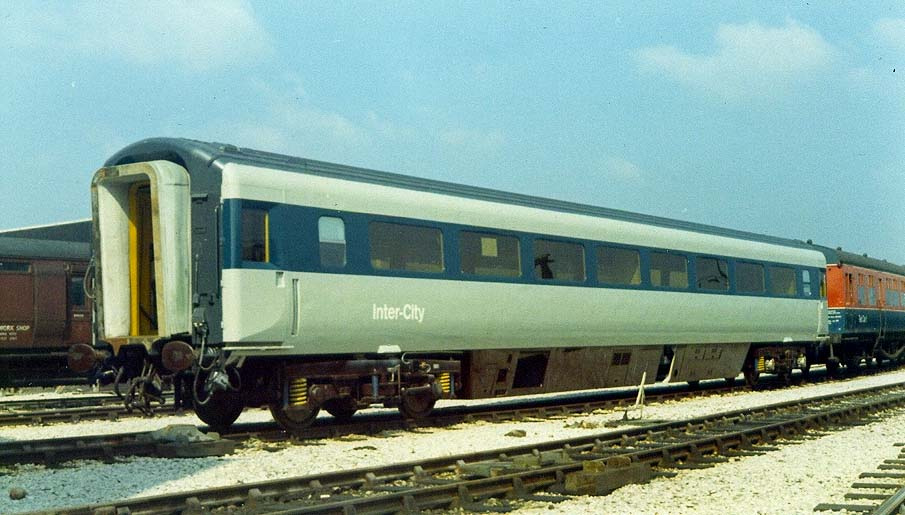
Prototype Mark 3 as delivered

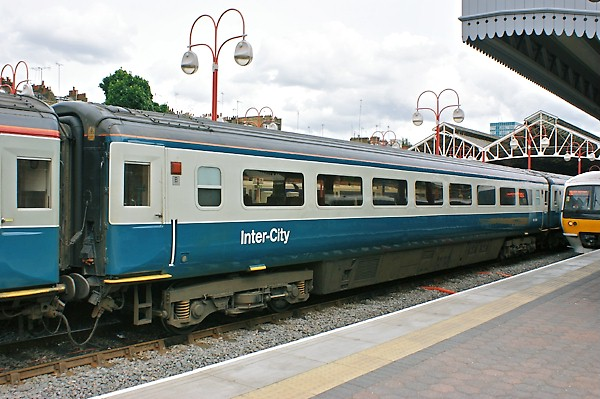
Cargo-D Mark 3 in as delivered InterCity livery at Marylebone in 2008

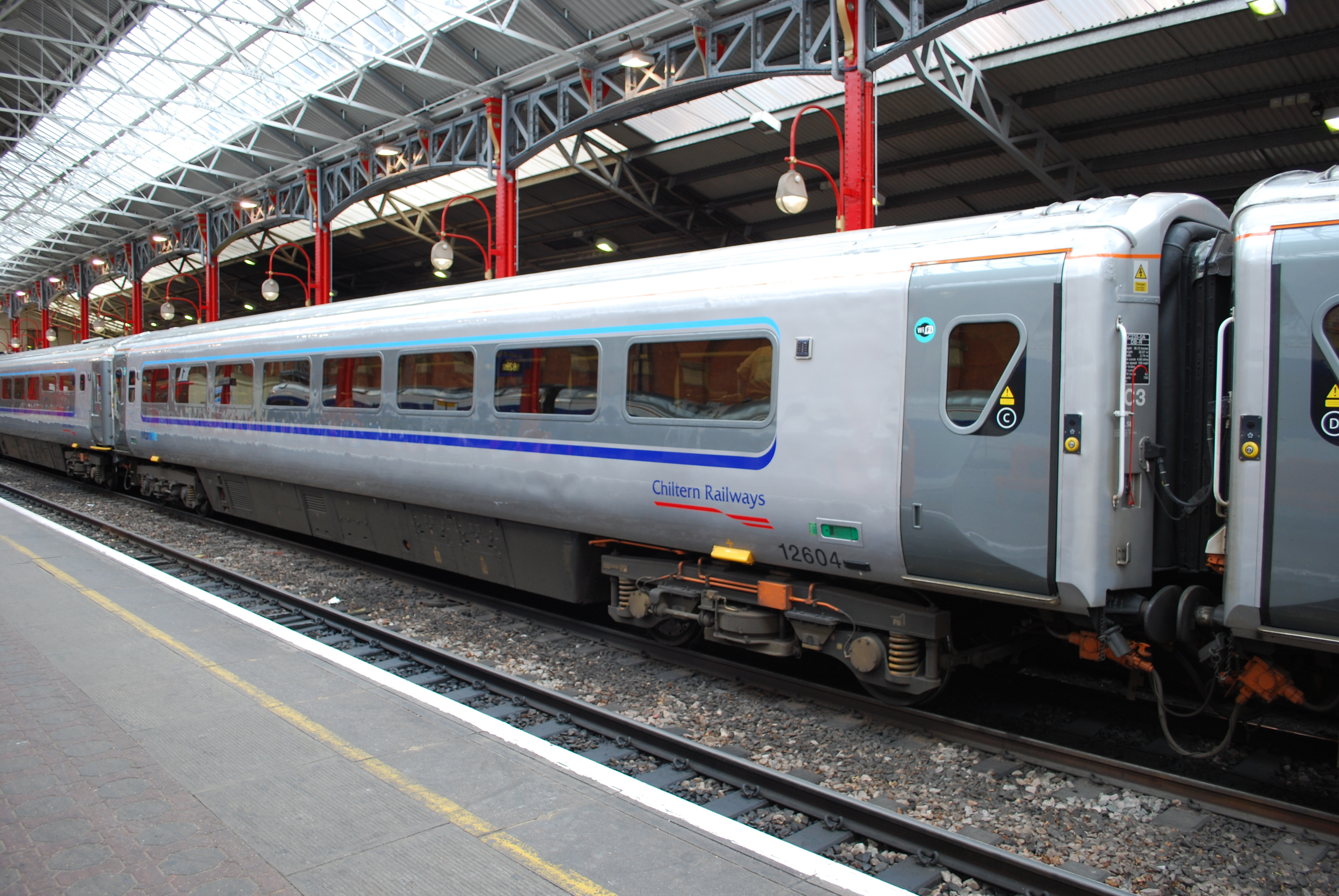
Chiltern Railways Mark 3 with retrofitted plug doors at London Marylebone in 2012

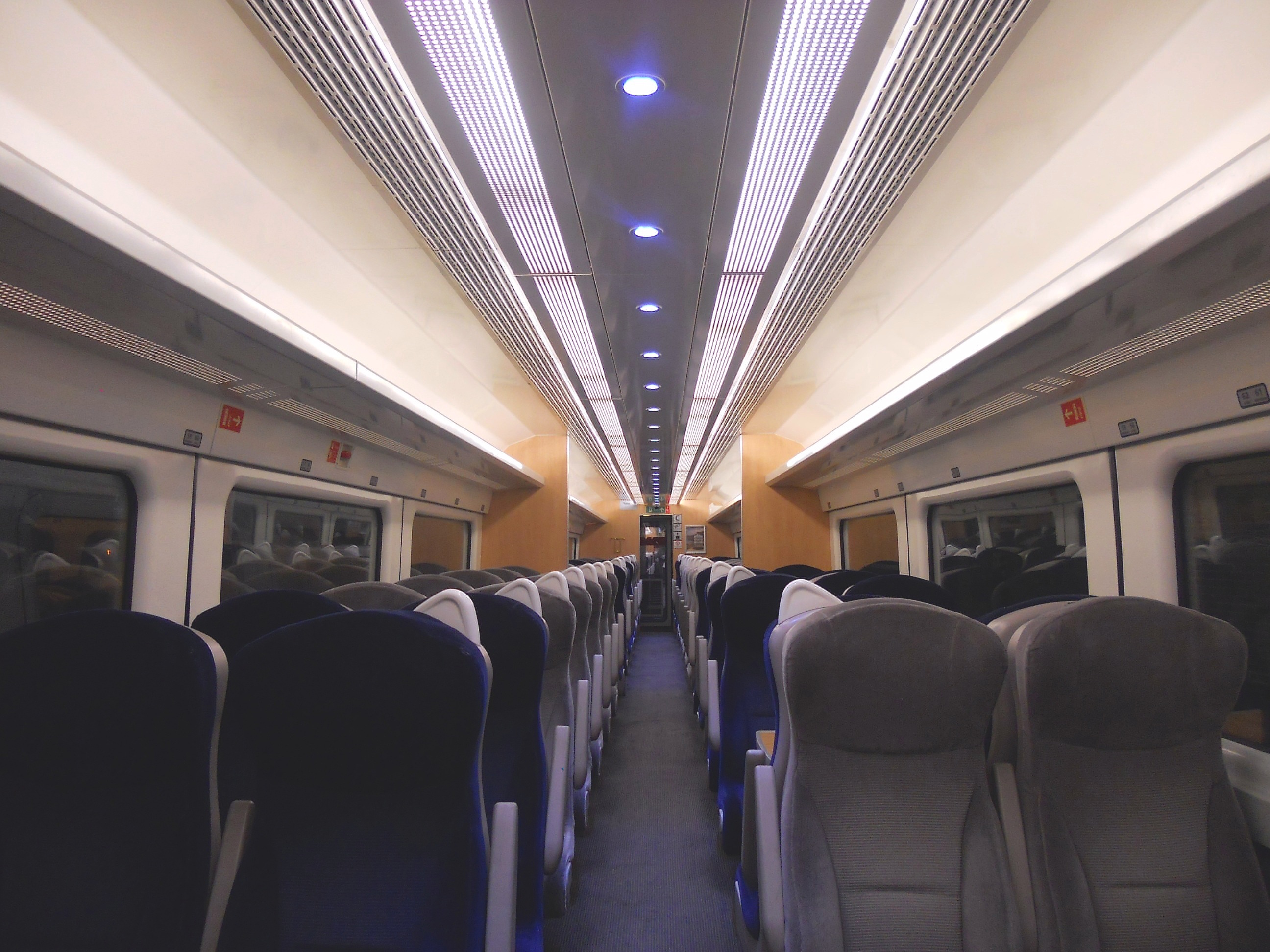
The interior of a GNER 'Project Mallard' refurbished Mark 3 Standard Class

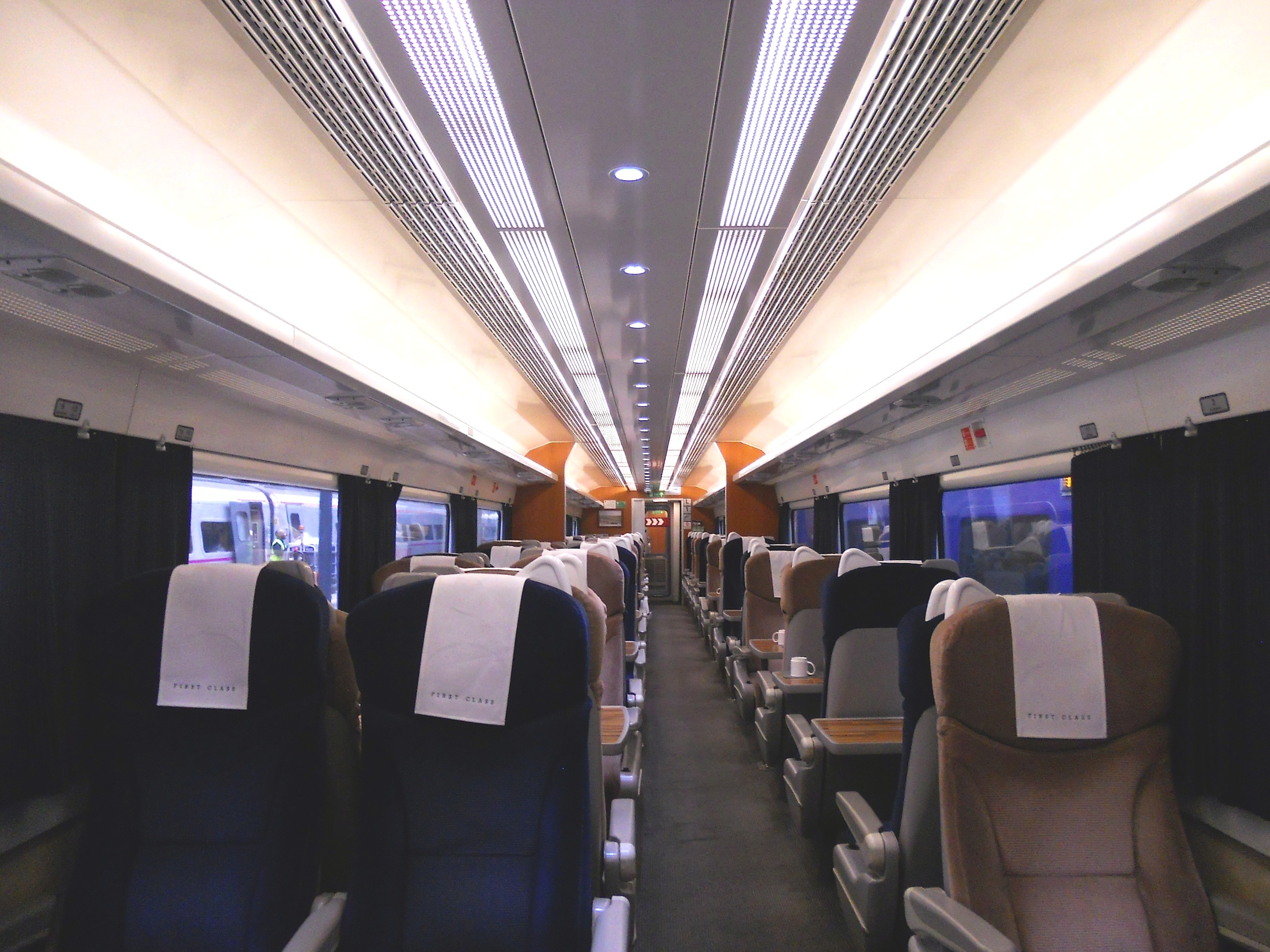
The interior of a GNER 'Project Mallard' refurbished Mark 3 First Class

== See also ==
- InterCity 125
- Class 43 power cars
- Coaching stock of Ireland
