= Plymouth Backpack =

Overview
- Manufacturer: Plymouth
- Production: 1995
- Designer: Tom Gale

Body and chassis
- Class: Concept car
- Body style: 2-door compact pickup
- Layout: FF
- Platform: Dodge Neon

Powertrain
- Engine: 2.0 L I4

The Plymouth Backpack is a compact pickup truck concept vehicle manufactured by Plymouth. It was unveiled at the 1995 Chicago Auto Show.

The 2+2 seating with an "El Camino-esque" versatility could carry two passengers with ease, and even left enough room for a small integrated table for a laptop inside the cabin. A built-in bike rack on the back was also built into the vehicle.

Tom Gale, Chrysler's design chief that had visions of the future vehicles of the company; 'not what Plymouth is today, but what it will be', designed the sporty Backpack.

The Backpack was based on Dodge Neon platform and featured a MoPar 2-liter OHC straight-4 engine producing 135 hp sending the power on the front wheels.
