= Backpack (novel) =

2001 novel by Emily Barr

- Author: Emily Barr
- Language: English
- Genre: Psychological thriller, travel fiction
- Publisher: Headline
- Publication date: 1 February 2001
- Publication place: United Kingdom
- Media type: Print (paperback)
- Pages: 472
- ISBN: 074726676X
- Followed by: Baggage

Backpack is a 2001 debut novel by English author Emily Barr, combining elements of psychological thriller, travel fiction and "chick lit". It tells about a solo female traveller being followed by a serial killer as she is backpacking through Southeast Asia.

The book received mostly positive reviews and won the WHSmith New Talent Award in 2002. It had reportedly sold in over 80,000 copies by 2009.

== Background ==
Emily Barr started working on the novel as a journalist on a year-long work trip in the late 1990s, during which she wrote a travel column for The Guardian. After her return to London, Barr secured a publishing deal with Headline Publishing Group on the basis of six chapters and a synopsis, having then about six months to complete the book.

Backpack was originally released in the UK by Headline Publishing Group on 1 February 2001. Later that year, it was translated into Dutch and published in the Netherlands. The US edition followed in late 2001 by Plume. In 2010, the novel was released as a Kindle e-book, and in 2014, as an audiobook narrated by Emma Fenney.

In September 2009, Barr published a sequel to Backpack, titled The Life You Want, set mostly in the Tamil Nadu state of India. The book received positive reviews.

Antonia Bird had bought the rights to adapt Backpack into a feature film, however, the project never came to fruitition.

== Plot summary ==
The novel is written largely in the first-person narrative, with occasional email correspondence between the protagonist and other characters.

The story follows Tansy Harris, a London-based journalist in her late twenties. A cocaine addict, Tansy wakes up from a near-fatal overdose on New Year's Day, still coming to terms with the death of her alcoholic mother. When her boyfriend, Tom, pulls out of their planned backpacking trip through Southeast Asia, Tansy decides to travel solo, landing in Vietnam and proceeding through Laos, Thailand, China and Nepal. Initially snobbish and judgemental, Tansy gradually becomes more open-minded and sheds her addictions. She also embarks on a travel romance with a fellow backpacker, Max. Meanwhile, news channels report about a serial killer operating in the region, targeting women closely resembling Tansy and possessing items that she owns as well.

== Characters ==
- Tansy Harris
- Tom – Tansy's boyfriend
- Roger Harris – Tansy's father
- William Marchmont – Tansy's brother
- Kate Jones – Tansy's friend
- Guy – Tansy's friend
- Tim O'Hare – Tansy's boss
- Amanda Evans – Tansy's colleague
- Max
- Gabe – Max's friend
- Ellie
- Eddy

== Critical reception ==
Backpack received generally favourable reviews from literary critics, and is regarded as one of Barr's best works. Publishers Weekly complimented the novel as "[c]austically hilarious and very entertaining", praising Barr as "a welcome new voice". Kirkus Reviews described it as "sparkly and entertaining", but criticized the "clumsily handled serial killer subplot and a depressingly tidy climax".

The reviewers noted similarities between Backback and Alex Garland's The Beach and Helen Fielding's Bridget Jones's Diary.

In a negative New Statesman review, the book was described as "an uncomfortable mixture of travelogue and fiction".
