= Trekking (disambiguation) =

Trekking is a form of backpacking.

Trekking may also refer to:

== Locomotion ==
- Hiking, a long, vigorous walk
- Walking, a gait of locomotion among legged animals
- Horse or pony trekking, a form of trail riding

== Other uses ==
- Trekking (horse), a thoroughbred racehorse
- Trekking bike, a type of hybrid bicycle
- Trekking sarl, a French aircraft manufacturer
- Trekking during the Blitz, a term applied to the nightly movements of civilians from British cities threatened by air raids

== See also ==
- Trekking peak
- Trekking pole
- Trek (disambiguation)
