= Saddle Tramp =

A saddle tramp is a person who wanders from place to place on horseback.

Saddle Tramp may also refer to:

- Saddle Tramp (album), a Charlie Daniels album and song
- "Saddle Tramp", a song by Molly Hatchet from the album Silent Reign of Heroes
- "Saddle Tramp", a song by Marty Robbins
- "Saddle Tramp", a song by Travis Shredd and the Good Ol' Homeboys
- "Saddle Tramp", a song by Dickless on the Sub Pop album The Grunge Years
- Saddle Tramp (film), a 1950 western starring Joel McCrea
- Saddle Tramp (comic strip), a short-lived photographic strip in Eagle (1982 comic)
- "Saddle Tramp", a 1944 short story by Johnston McCulley
- Saddle Tramps, a school spirit organization at Texas Tech University
- The Saddletramps, an alternative country band from Toronto, Ontario in the 1980s and 1990s
