= Angarrack viaduct =

Angarrack Viaduct
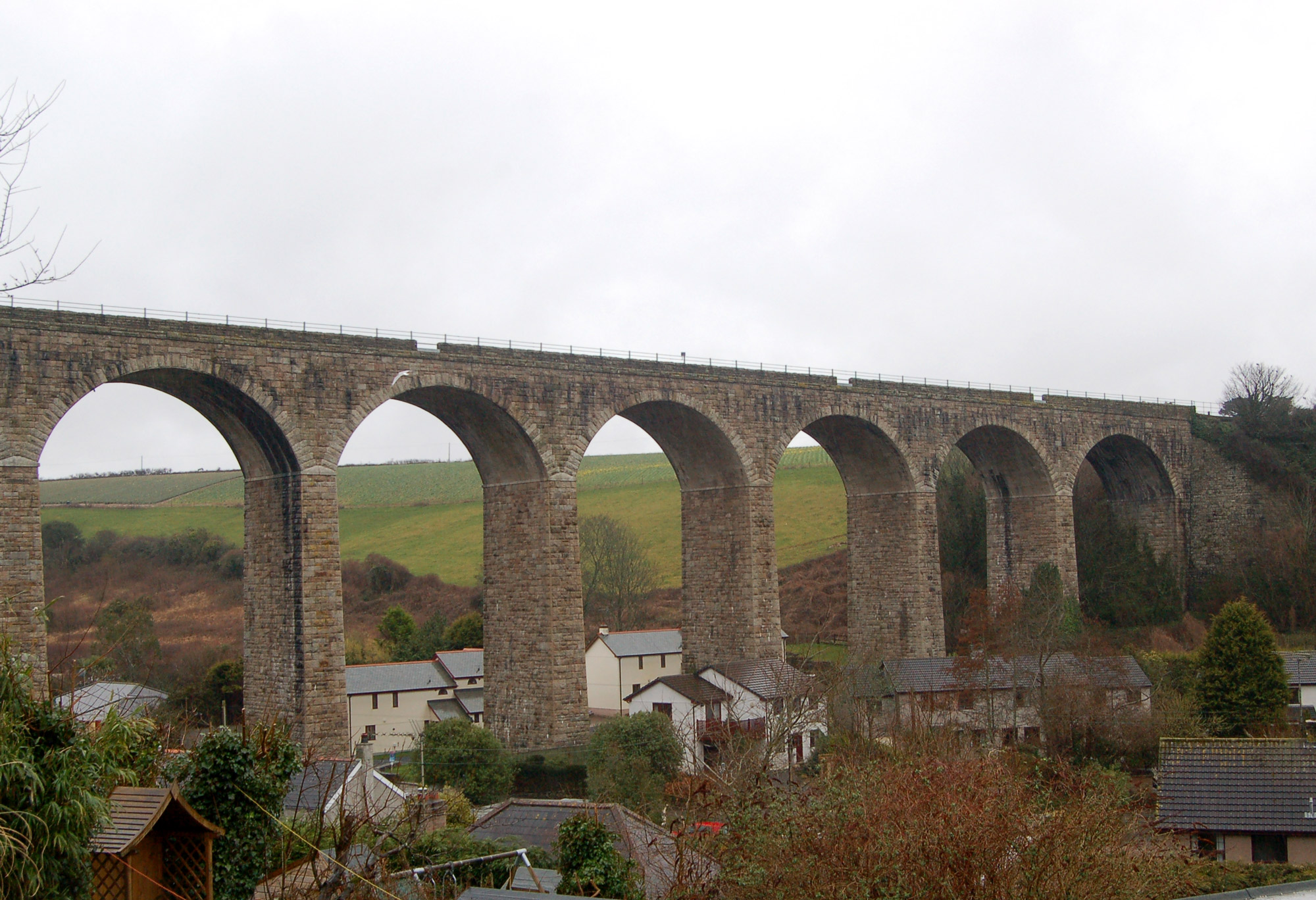
- Coordinates: 50.193269°N 5.385473°W
- Carries: Cornish Main Line
- Locale: Angarrack, Cornwall
- Preceded by: Penponds Viaduct
- Followed by: Guildford Viaduct

Characteristics
- Material: Granite
- Total length: 243 metres (797 ft)
- No. of spans: 11

History
- Constructed by: H Stevens, Ashburton
- Construction start: 1883
- Opened: 1888

Statistics

Listed Building – Grade II
- Official name: The viaduct at SW58353801
- Designated: 14 January 1988
- Reference no.: 1143709
- Legacy System: LBS
- Legacy System number: 70158

Location
- Interactive map of Angarrack Viaduct

Angarrack railway viaduct crosses the valley of the Angarrack River at Angarrack in west Cornwall, England, United Kingdom.

== Geography ==
The eleven-arch granite-built viaduct carries the Cornish Main Line railway across the steep-sided valley of the Angarrack River, a tributary of the River Hayle, between the present day stations of Camborne and Hayle. The village extends up the valley and under the viaduct.

== History ==
The original viaduct at Angarrack was designed by Isambard Kingdom Brunel for the West Cornwall Railway and was "built wholly of timber on stone footings". It was nearly 800 feet (240 m) long and 100 feet (30 m) high. The stone from the original Brunel footings was re-used to construct the sea wall on the approach to Penzance railway station. Today, no evidence remains of Brunel's original structure.

Building of the replacement commenced in January 1883 by Mr H Stevens of Ashburton, who also built the replacement viaducts at Redruth and Guildford (west of Angarrack). A tram-road of a few hundred yards was laid to a nearby quarry owned by Mr Gregor to provide infill for the granite viaduct. The foundations were expected to be at least 30 feet (9.1 m) deep and the work would take two to three years. It was opened by the Great Western Railway in 1888 and its eleven granite arches each have a span of 56.5 feet (17.2 m). It is a Grade II listed building.

== See also ==
- Angarrack railway station
- Cornwall Railway viaducts
