= Redruth railway station =

Railway station in Cornwall, England

Redruth
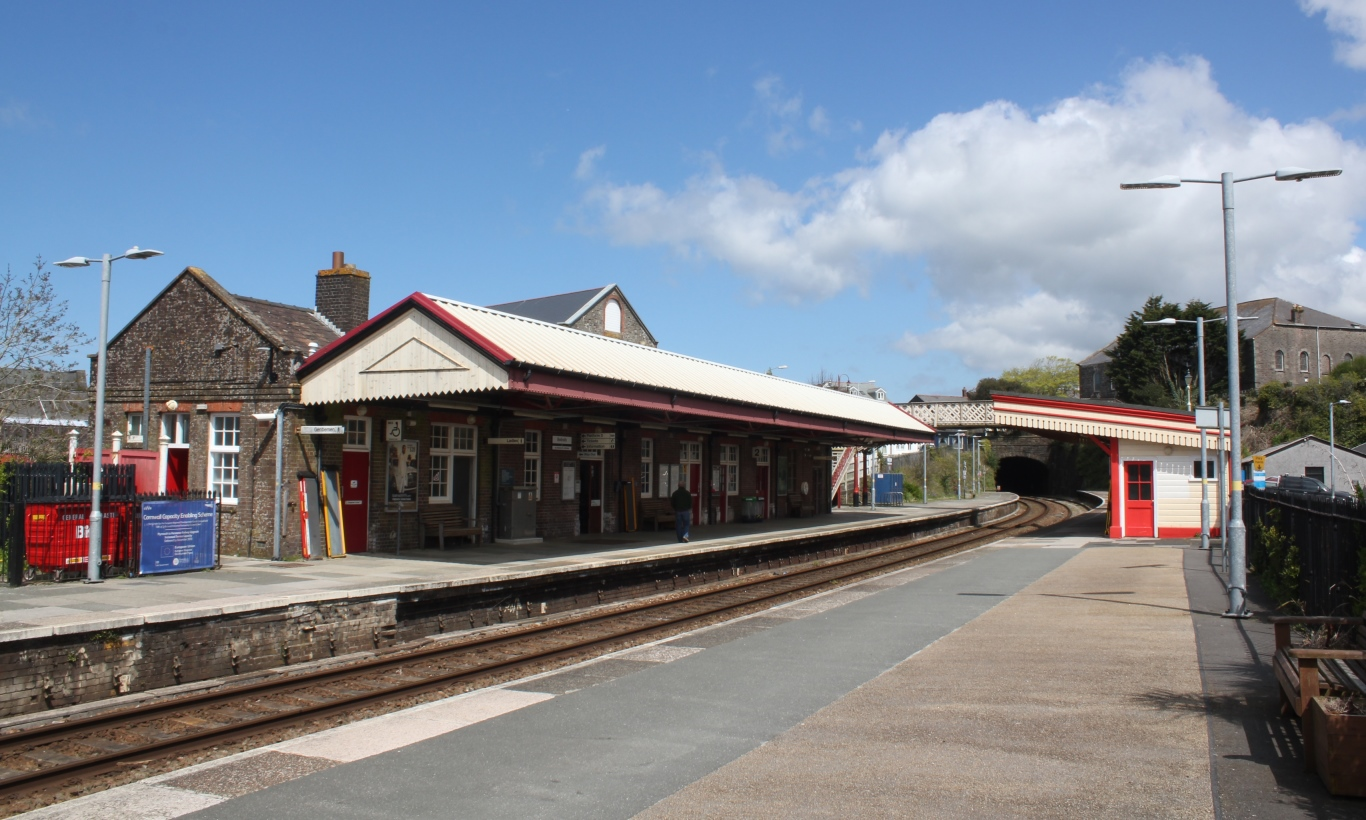

General information
- Location: Redruth, Cornwall, England
- Coordinates: 50.233°N 5.226°W
- Grid reference: SW700420
- Manager: Great Western Railway
- Platforms: 2

Other information
- Station code: RED
- Classification: DfT category D

History
- Original company: West Cornwall Railway
- Pre-grouping: Great Western Railway
- Post-grouping: Great Western Railway

Key dates
- Opened: 1852

Passengers
- 2021/22: ▲0.304 million
- 2022/23: ▲0.329 million
- 2023/24: ▲0.362 million
- 2024/25: ▲0.416 million
- 2025/26: ▲0.419 million
Location
Notes
- Passenger statistics from the Office of Rail and Road

Redruth railway station serves the town of Redruth, in Cornwall, England. It lies on the Cornish Main Line between Truro and Camborne, 309 miles 68 chains (309.9 mi; 498.7 km) down the line from London Paddington, via Box and Plymouth Millbay. The station is managed by Great Western Railway, which operates most of the services alongside CrossCountry.

== History ==
=== First station ===
The Hayle Railway opened a station on the west side of Redruth on 31 May 1838. (Note: The first station was located at: 50.2316°N 5.2326°W.) The railway had been built to move goods to and from local mines and the harbours at Hayle and Portreath. A passenger service started on 26 May 1843; nearly 200 people travelled on the first train from Redruth to Hayle.

Preceding station	Historical railways	Following station
Terminus	Hayle Railway	Pool

=== Second station ===
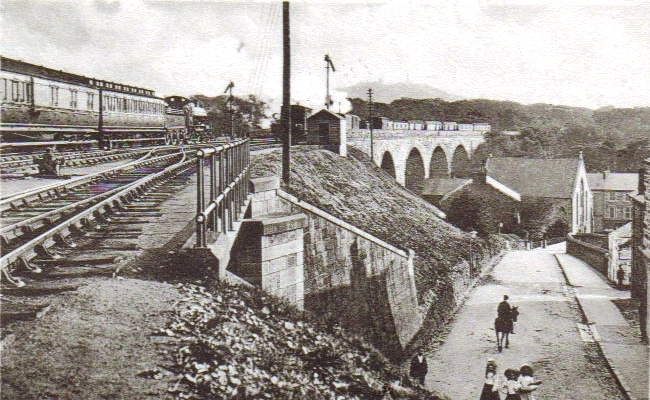
A train pulls away from the station and over the viaduct in the early 1900s

The West Cornwall Railway (WCR) was authorised by an Act of Parliament, passed on 3 August 1846, to take over the Hayle Railway; it could extend its line westwards to Penzance and eastward to Truro. It took possession of the line on 3 November 1846 and set about rebuilding it. A viaduct was built 61 feet (19 m) above the streets of Redruth and a new station was opened at the east end of this on 11 March 1852. On 25 August, the line was continued through a short tunnel at the east end of Redruth station to a temporary station at Truro Highertown. It was completed to a station at Newham Wharf in Truro in 1855. The city's present day station was reached in 1859, but through trains over the Cornwall Railway could not start until 1867 due to the two railways being built to different gauges. The main station buildings were replaced by the Great Western Railway (GWR) in the 1930s, but an old wooden shelter survives on the westbound platform and the footbridge is marked as being erected in 1888.

The original Hayle Railway station became a goods depot when the new WCR station opened, access to it being controlled by 'Redruth Junction' signal box which also controlled access to the goods branch line to Tresavean mine. Goods sidings were also provided on both sides of the line at the new station, with a large goods shed on the north side of the line. A new goods depot for Redruth was opened at Drump Lane, east of the tunnel, in 1912.

The original 489 feet (149 m) viaduct was built in timber to the designs of Isambard Kingdom Brunel, but it was replaced in 1888 by a masonry structure by P.J. Margery for the GWR. The line had until now been just a single track with a passing loop in the station, but the new viaduct was wide enough for two tracks once the 7 ft (2,134 mm) gauge rail was no longer required following the abandonment of broad gauge services in 1892. The second line was brought into use over the viaduct in February 1894 and extended eastwards beyond the station in 1911.

Preceding station	Historical railways	Following station
Scorrier	Great Western Railway; Cornish Main Line	Carn Brea

=== Stationmasters ===
- J.G. Bone (ca.1863–65) (later station master at Penzance)
- John Lovell (ca.1871–96)
- Alfred Uren (1896–1912) (formerly station master at Exeter St Thomas)
- C.H.W. Isaac (1912–26) (formerly station master at Hayle)
- Joseph Mortlock Williams (1926–35)
- F.R. Sherman (1935–50) (formerly station master at Helston, also station master at Carn Brea)
- William Thomas John Protheroe (1950–53)
- A.C. Smith (1953–54) (later station master at Falmouth Docks)
- Marcel H. Kingdon (1954–65).

== Description ==
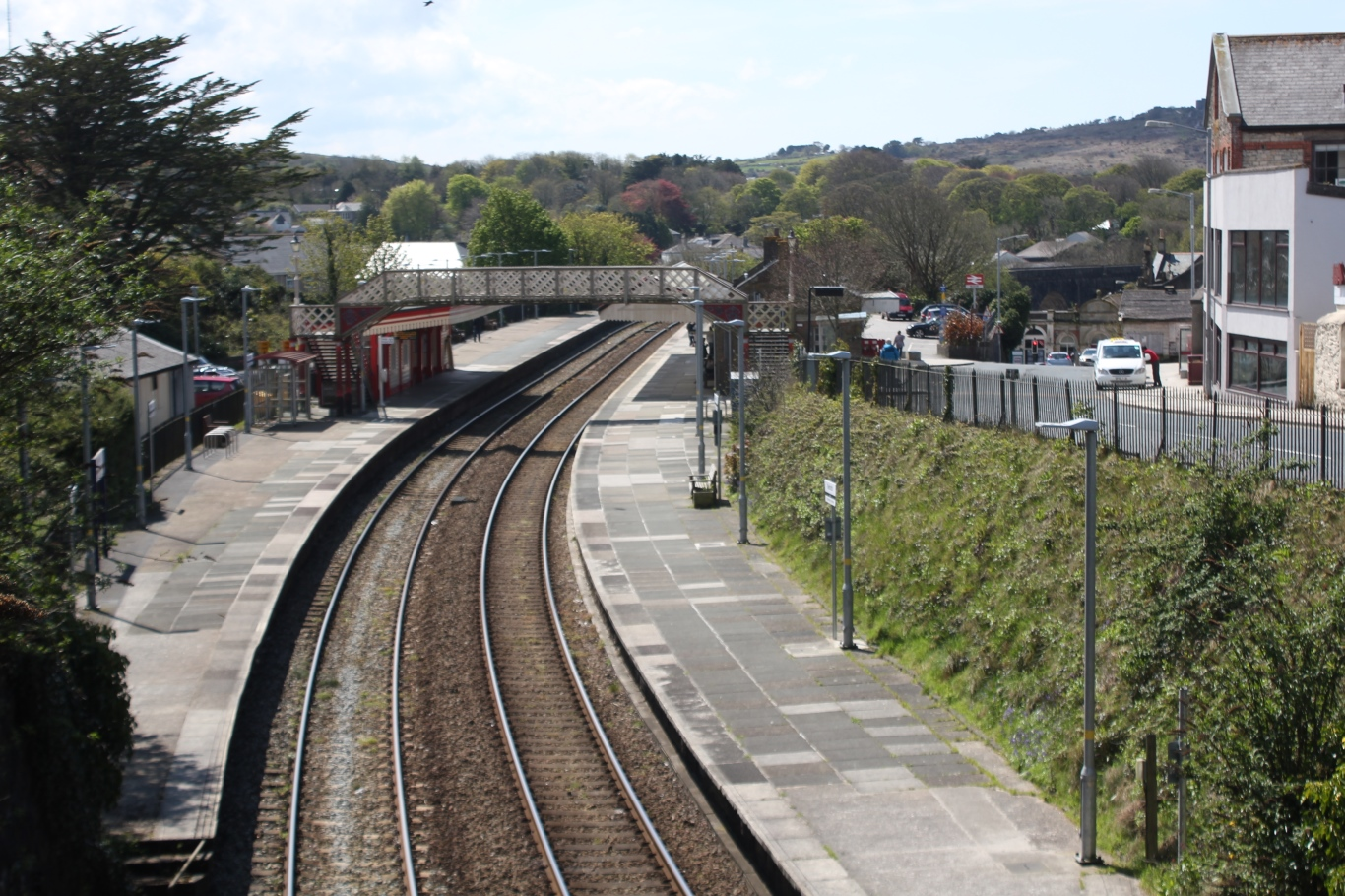
Looking westwards from above the tunnel

The station has two platforms:

1. westbound for trains towards St Erth and Penzance
2. eastbound for trains towards Truro, Plymouth, Exeter St Davids and London Paddington.

The station is on the side of a hill, with the road climbing steeply from beneath the viaduct at the west end of the station, to climb over the tunnel at the east end. The entrance to the station lies where the road and railway are on the same level.

On the eastbound platform is the main station building, with a ticket office, waiting area, toilets and a café. A footbridge connecting the two platforms is at the east end of the station building. There is step-free access options to both platforms and to the eastbound platform this is via an approach road on that side of the line. Buses call at the main entrance to the eastbound platform. There are car parks on each side of the station.

== Services ==
A Class 158 on a service to Penzance

Redruth is served by two train operating companies, which provide the following general off-peak service pattern in trains per hour/day (tph/tpd):

Great Western Railway:

- 2 tph to Penzance
- 2 tph to Plymouth; of which:
  - 1 tp2h continues to Exeter St Davids
  - 1 tp2h continues to London Paddington, via Exeter St Davids, Taunton and Reading.

The Night Riviera sleeper:

- 1 tpd to Penzance
- 1 tpd to London Paddington.

CrossCountry:

- 2 tpd to Penzance
- 1 tpd to Edinburgh Waverley, via Bristol Temple Meads, Birmingham New Street, Leeds and York
- 1 tpd to Birmingham New Street.

Preceding station	National Rail	Following station
Camborne	Great Western Railway; Cornish Main Line	Truro
Camborne	CrossCountry; Cornish Main Line	Truro

== See also ==
- Redruth and Chasewater Railway
