= Disused railway stations on the Cornish Main Line =

There are seventeen disused railway stations on the Cornish Main Line between Plymouth in Devon and Penzance in Cornwall, England. The remains of nine of these can be seen from passing trains. While a number of these were closed following the so-called "Beeching Axe" in the 1960s, many of them had been closed much earlier, the traffic for which they had been built failing to materialise.

== Background ==
The railway from Plymouth to Truro was opened by the Cornwall Railway on 4 May 1859, where it joined up with the West Cornwall Railway which had been completed from there to Penzance on 16 April 1855. The section from Carn Brea to Angarrack dates back to the Hayle Railway, opened on 23 December 1837. It now forms Network Rail's Cornish Main Line.

== Plymouth to Truro ==
=== Plymouth Millbay ===
The trains of the South Devon Railway finally reached the town of Plymouth on 2 April 1849. Docks were opened adjacent to the station and a new headquarters office was built next door. The station was expanded ready for the opening of the Cornwall Railway on 4 May 1859 and the South Devon and Tavistock Railway on 22 June 1859. It became known as Plymouth Millbay after other stations were opened in the town in 1876–7 at Mutley and North Road.

The station was closed to passengers on 23 April 1941 after bombs destroyed the nearby goods depot; the passenger station being used thereafter only for goods traffic and access to the carriage sheds. All traffic ceased from 14 December 1969 except for goods trains running through to the docks which continued until 30 June 1971.

The site is now occupied by the Plymouth Pavilions leisure complex. Two granite gate posts outside the Millbay Road entrance are all that is left of the station, although a goods shed on what used to be Washington Place is still extant nearby

=== Wingfield Villas Halt ===
This suburban halt (50.3781°N 4.1579°W) near Devonport Junction in Plymouth was opened by the Great Western Railway on 1 June 1904. It was served by the Plympton to Saltash railmotor service introduced at that time to compete with the electric tramways in the town. It was closed in June 1921.

=== Ford Halt ===
Ford (50.3856°N 4.1776°W) was one of the halts opened by the Great Western Railway for its railmotor services on 1 June 1904. It was located to serve the northern district of Devonport which had grown around the naval dockyard; other stations serving this traffic were opened at Keyham (1900) and Dockyard Halt (1905). The denuded remains of the southbound platform still remain, just west of an underbridge into the Royal Navy Dockyard and at the commencement of the cutting before Keyham.

It was closed on 6 October 1941, during the World War II blitz of Plymouth and Devonport.

=== Defiance Platform ===
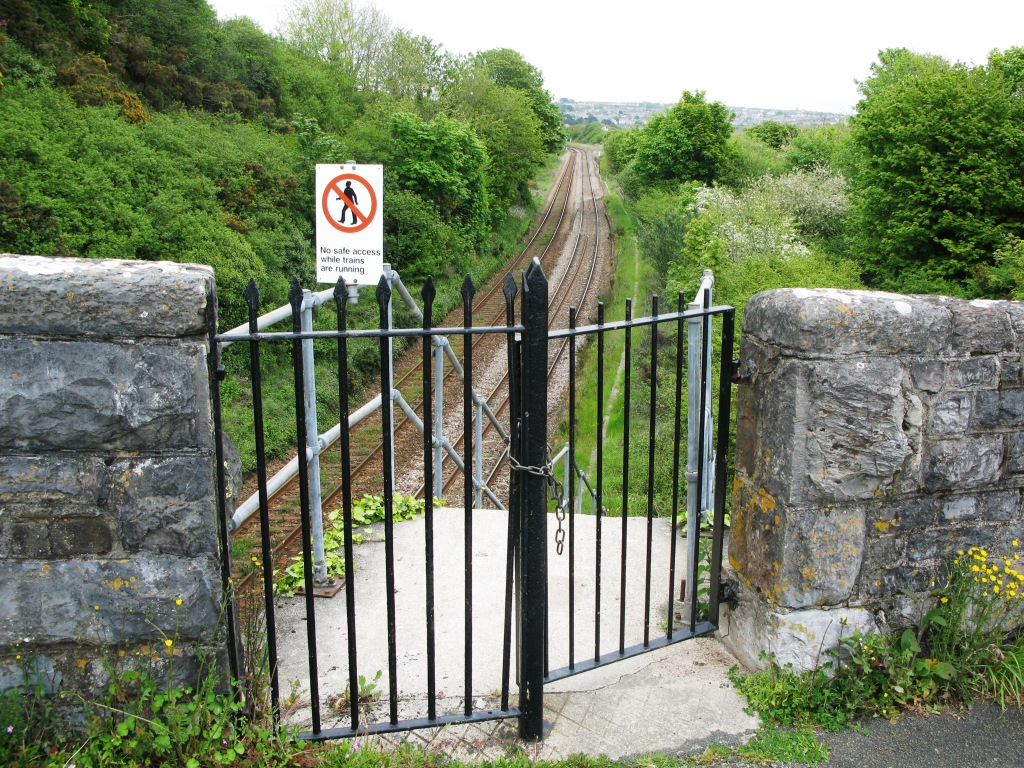
Old entrance to Defiance Platform in May 2009

Defiance Platform (50.3981°N 4.2188°W) (252 miles 11 chains or 405.8 km) was opened by the Great Western Railway on 1 March 1905 and served naval personnel travelling to the nearby torpedo training school on HMS Defiance which was moored nearby. Most trains were the railmotors and auto trains from Plympton which were run for an extra 3/4 mile (1.2 km) beyond Saltash where they otherwise terminated.

The line was doubled and moved on 4 February 1906 and Wearde became the junction for a deviation line to St Germans that allowed the removal of the remaining timber viaducts on the Cornish Main Line. As a result of the deviation the platform was moved in 1907, where access to the platform was by steps from a bridge that carried a road across the railway to Wearde Quay. The signal box that had been at the original location was also relocated and was situated at one end of the platform.

The station closed to passengers on 27 October 1930 but continued to be used for loading goods traffic until the 1950s. The platforms are still in existence and alterations to the road bridge to accommodate the new alignment of 1906 can be clearly seen. The old line was retained as carriage sidings for Saltash until 2 December 1964 and another siding behind the platform was kept in use until 1972.

=== Doublebois ===
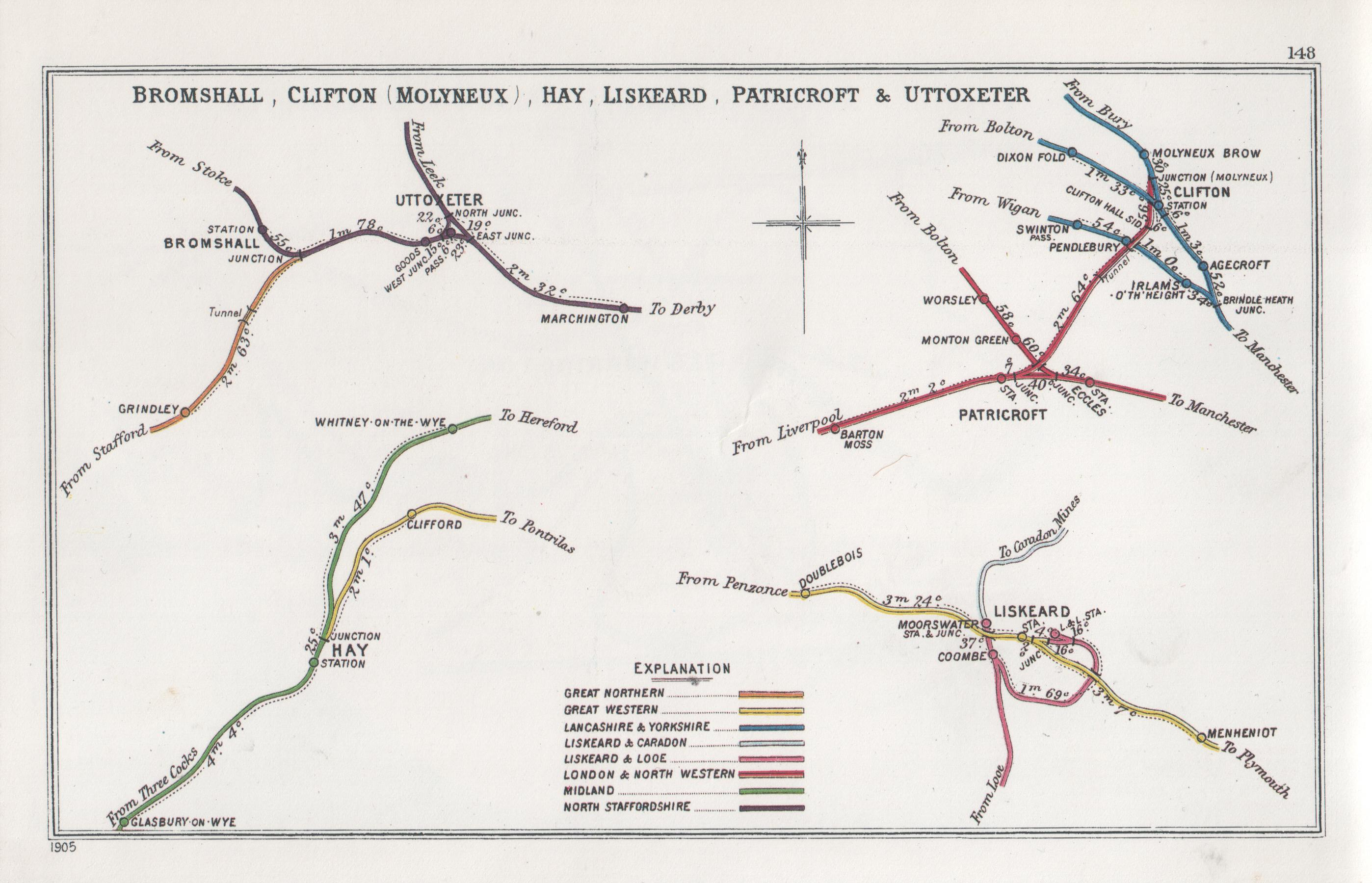
A 1905 Railway Clearing House Junction Diagram showing (lower right) railways in the vicinity of Doublebois

Doublebois station (Cornish: Kosdewblek) (50.4558°N 4.5381°W) (268 miles 14 chains or 431.59 kilometres) was situated at the west end of a cutting which is the summit of the Cornwall Railway. A siding was provided here when it opened on 4 May 1859 to enable trains to be split into smaller parts to enable them to be worked over the steep inclines up from Liskeard and Bodmin Road.

In January 1860 the railway company was asked to provide a facility here for goods traffic, which they acceded to after local people subscribed £130 towards it and offered the necessary land. Because of this the company offered to build an accompanying passenger station. The station opened on 1 June 1860, providing a service to people and mines in the St Neot area, providing a passing loop until the line was doubled in 1894. A signal box was provided part way along the platform, with sidings at both ends on the down side. During World War II, the eastern sidings were used by the military for ammunition.

The station was closed on 5 October 1964, and the sidings were taken out of use in January 1968. Extant earthworks are still visible from passing trains.

=== Respryn ===
Due to delays in securing the site for Bodmin Road, the Cornwall Railway provided a temporary station a little further west for the opening of the line on 4 May 1859 until the permanent station was ready on 27 June 1859.

=== Burngullow ===
Once it was open, the Cornwall Railway found there was a demand for facilities to transport china clay from the St Stephens district to Par harbour. To satisfy this they opened a station consisting of a single platform at Burngullow (Cornish: Bronnwolow) (50.3364°N 4.8381°W) (288 miles 45 chains or 464.40 kilometres) on 1 February 1863. The construction costs were largely met by Mr Robartes, who had interests in the extraction of the china clay.

A branch line to Nanpean was opened for goods traffic by the Newquay and Cornwall Junction Railway on 1 July 1869. A small engine shed was built by them on the north side of the station. The shed closed in 1922 and was removed in 1931.

The station was closed and rebuilt a little further west (288 miles 56 chains or 464.62 kilometres) on 1 August 1901, this time with two platforms, and closed to passengers on 14 September 1931. The sidings and branch continue to handle heavy china clay traffic.

The large dryer and storage sheds alongside the main line are the Blackpool clay works; Burngullow clay works are smaller and situated alongside the branch line a short distance from the junction.

Two railway accidents have happened here, both involving runaway china clay trains. On the first occasion a train had left Burngullow with wagons for Par harbour on 29 October 1872. It was unable to stop for signals at St Austell but the driver of the passenger train coming in the other direction saw the train sliding towards it and reversed his train back to Par.

On 9 June 1952 a similar problem occurred with a train on the branch line approaching Burngullow. This time the train ran into a siding where it collided with a stationary engine. Unfortunately the driver of the runaway train, who had stayed at the controls in an attempt to bring it to a halt, later died from his injuries.

The former 'up side' (London bound) station building still remains some seventy years plus after closure.

The signal box was closed in 1986 when the Burngullow to Probus section of the main line was singled, and the signals were then controlled by the Signal Box at Par railway station. The double line was reinstated in 2004.

=== Grampound Road ===
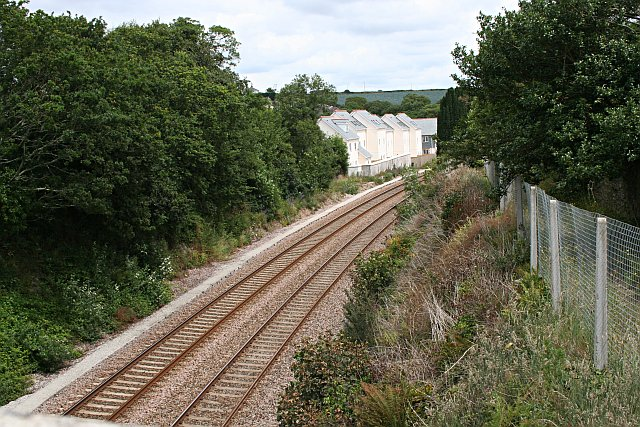
New houses have been built at Grampound Road since the station closed, pictured in July 2006.

A two-platform station (50.3177°N 4.9287°W) (293 miles 16 chains or 471.86 kilometres) to serve Grampound was opened in a cutting by the Cornwall Railway on 4 May 1859, but it was known as "Grampound Road" due to the distance from that town. Wooden waiting shelters were provided on each platform, and a newspaper at the time of opening reported merely that "it comprises arrival and departure stations exactly similar to those at Par."

There was a loop on the up line at the down end of the station with a trailing crossover. A goods shed was not provided until 1864 when one was erected in the up yard, but with up and down yards the goods traffic developed quickly: 3,580 cattle were dispatched in the twelve months to June 1869, more than any other station on the line. A signal box was erected half way along the up platform of brick with a timber upper floor and slate roof.

Because of its remote location two cottages were built in 1860 for the station master and his staff. A small village known as Grampound Road (Cornish: Fordh Ponsmeur) grew up around the railway station and continues to expand despite the station's closing (along with Doublebois, Chacewater, Scorrier, Gwinear Road and Marazion) on 5 October 1964, but the signal box remained open until June 1972. Harry Hingston was the last registered paid employee and station master.

The site is easily recognised from passing trains.

=== Probus and Ladock Halt ===
The Probus and Ladock halt (Cornish: Lannbrobus hag Egloslajek) (50.2950°N 4.9686°W) (295 miles 47 chains or 475.70 kilometres) was nearer to Probus than Ladock which was actually nearer to Grampound Road railway station and was opened by the Great Western Railway on 1 February 1908 as Probus and Ladock Platform, the term platform being used rather than Halt to indicate that it was staffed although it was later changed to an unstaffed halt. Platforms were provided on both sides of the track of mixed timber and brick construction with access to each platform directly by a footpath from the road, and a foot crossing at rail level as there was no footbridge. Characteristic Great Western Railway corrugated iron waiting shelters were provided on both of the wooden platforms at opening and remained in use throughout, and there was a signal box at the down end of the down platform. The station was closed on 2 December 1957, and by the early 1990s there was no trace of the down platform, but the section of the up platform that was built of brick was identifiable as a grassy mound with a signalling relay room on top.

== Truro to Penzance ==
=== Chacewater ===
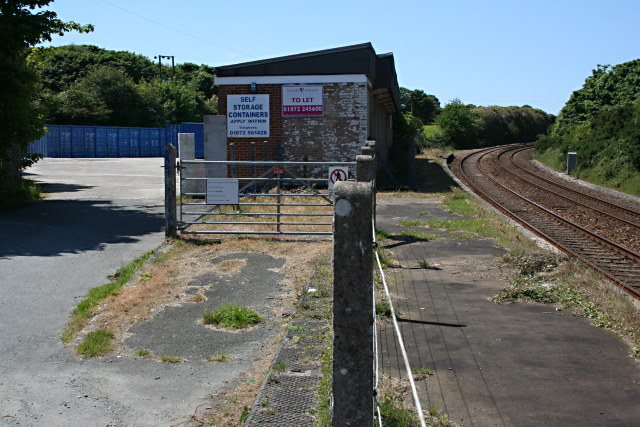
Chacewater railway station in June 2008

A station (50.2638°N 5.1698°W) (306 miles 1 chain or 492.48 kilometres) was opened at Chacewater (Cornish: Dowr an Chas) by the West Cornwall Railway on 25 August 1852. On 6 July 1903 a branch line to Perranporth was opened from nearby Blackwater; it was extended to Newquay on 2 January 1905. Blackwater Junction was closed on 9 November 1924 which resulted in the physical junction being moved the half mile to Chacewater station, although most trains ran through to Truro.

The Perranporth line closed on 4 February 1963. The station closed to passengers on 5 October 1964 but continued to be served by goods traffic for many years, latterly for Blue Circle Cement. The Penzance bound platforms can still be seen, complete with much altered station building.

There are two viaducts east of Chacewater. The 128 yard (181 m) Blackwater Viaduct is immediately east of the station site and the 93 yard (132 m) Chacewater Viaduct is a little further east towards Truro.

Preceding station	Historical railways	Following station
Truro	Great Western Railway; Cornish Main Line	Redruth
Truro	Great Western Railway; Truro & Newquay	Mount Hawke Halt

=== Scorrier ===
A station (50.2531°N 5.1964°W) (307 miles 57 chains or 495.22 kilometres) was opened at Scorrier (Cornish: Skorya) by the West Cornwall Railway on 25 August 1852. Initially known as "Scorrier Gate", the name was changed to "Scorrier" in March 1856. It reverted to "Scorrier Gate" from 1 June 1859 but became plain "Scorrier" once more on 1 October 1896. Originally stone-built waiting rooms were erected on both platforms, each with a cantilever canopy, but at some stage an additional wooden building was erected on the down platform more than doubling the accommodation. The platforms were connected by an open footbridge of metal construction.

The last trains to call at Scorrier were on 3 October 1964. Class 118 DMUs W51309 and W51324 formed the last down train, and W51304 and W51319 the last up train. It closed to passengers on 5 October 1964.

Preceding station	Disused railways	Following station
Redruth	Great Western Railway; Cornish Main Line	Chacewater

=== Carn Brea ===
A station (50.2213°N 5.2672°W) (311 miles 70 chains or 501.91 kilometres) was opened near Carn Brea (Cornish: Karnbre) on 23 May 1843 by the Hayle Railway and named "Pool" after a nearby village. The railway was closed on 16 February 1852 and reopened by the West Cornwall Railway on 11 March 1852, however Pool station remained closed until 25 August 1852, when it was reopened as "Carn Brea", only to be renamed "Pool" once more in June 1854. It reverted to "Carn Brea" on 1 November 1875. It was closed on 2 January 1961.

Carn Brea was the home of the West Cornwall Railway's workshops, where they maintained the locomotives and rolling stock.

Preceding station	Disused railways	Following station
Camborne	Great Western Railway; Cornish Main Line	Redruth

=== Dolcoath Halt ===
The Great Western Railway opened a railmotor halt (50.2142°N 5.2837°W) (312 miles 62 chains or 503.36 kilometres) near Dolcoath mine on 28 August 1905 but it closed again on 1 May 1908; the days when Dolcoath was one of the biggest mines in Cornwall were long past. The halt was situated to the west of Dolcoath level crossing, and the site can be recognised because of this.

=== Penponds ===
The Hayle Railway provided a station at Penponds (Cornish: Pennpons) from 23 May 1843 until 16 February 1852. It was not replaced when the West Cornwall Railway opened a month later.

=== Gwinear Road ===
A station known as "Gwinear Road" (Cornish: Fordh Gwynnyer) (50.1972°N 5.3478°W) (316 miles 0 chains or 508.55 kilometres) was opened by the West Cornwall Railway on 11 March 1852, west of a level crossing, and became a junction for the Helston Railway on 9 May 1887. The goods yard lay west of the station to the north of the line, but extensive sidings were constructed alongside the main line east of the level crossing to handle traffic for the branch. The main station building was of wooden construction and was located on the up platform with just a canopy on the down platform, the two platforms being connected by a footbridge of cast metal construction and utilitarian appearance. There were also two signalboxes at Gwinear Road: Gwinear Road West Signal Box, located on the up end of the down platform, opened on 30 November 1916 and was closed on 31 October 1965 when the adjacent level crossing was converted from manual gates to Automatic Half Barriers. Gwinear Road East Signal Box was located in the goods marshalling yard and controlled access to the Helston branch.

The branch line to Helston closed to passengers on 3 September 1962 and to goods on 5 October 1964 when Gwinear Road station also closed. The former 'down' (Penzance-bound) platform and Helston branch bay is still more or less intact.

Preceding station	Disused railways	Following station
Hayle	Great Western Railway; Cornish Main Line	Camborne
Terminus	Great Western Railway; Helston Railway	Praze

=== Angarrack ===
The Hayle Railway introduced passenger trains on 23 May 1843. The service was closed on 16 February 1852. On 11 March 1852 the West Cornwall Railway opened a new station. The old station had been on the section of the Hayle Railway that was closed entirely as a steep rope-worked incline descended from Angarrack (Cornish: An Garrek) to sea level at Copperhouse, it was replaced by a much gentler incline to the new Hayle railway station. However the new Angarrack station was closed in 1853. (See also Angarrack viaduct.)

=== Copperhouse Halt ===
The Great Western Railway introduced railmotor services in west Cornwall and provided several small halts at which they called. Copperhouse (Cornish: Chi Kober) (50.1894°N 5.4070°W) was one of the small halts provided for these services, opening on 1 July 1905 to provide a service to the Copperhouse district in Hayle. It closed in 1908.

An earlier station had been provided at Copperhouse nearer the waterfront by the Hayle Railway from 23 May 1843 until their line closed on 16 February 1852.

=== Marazion ===
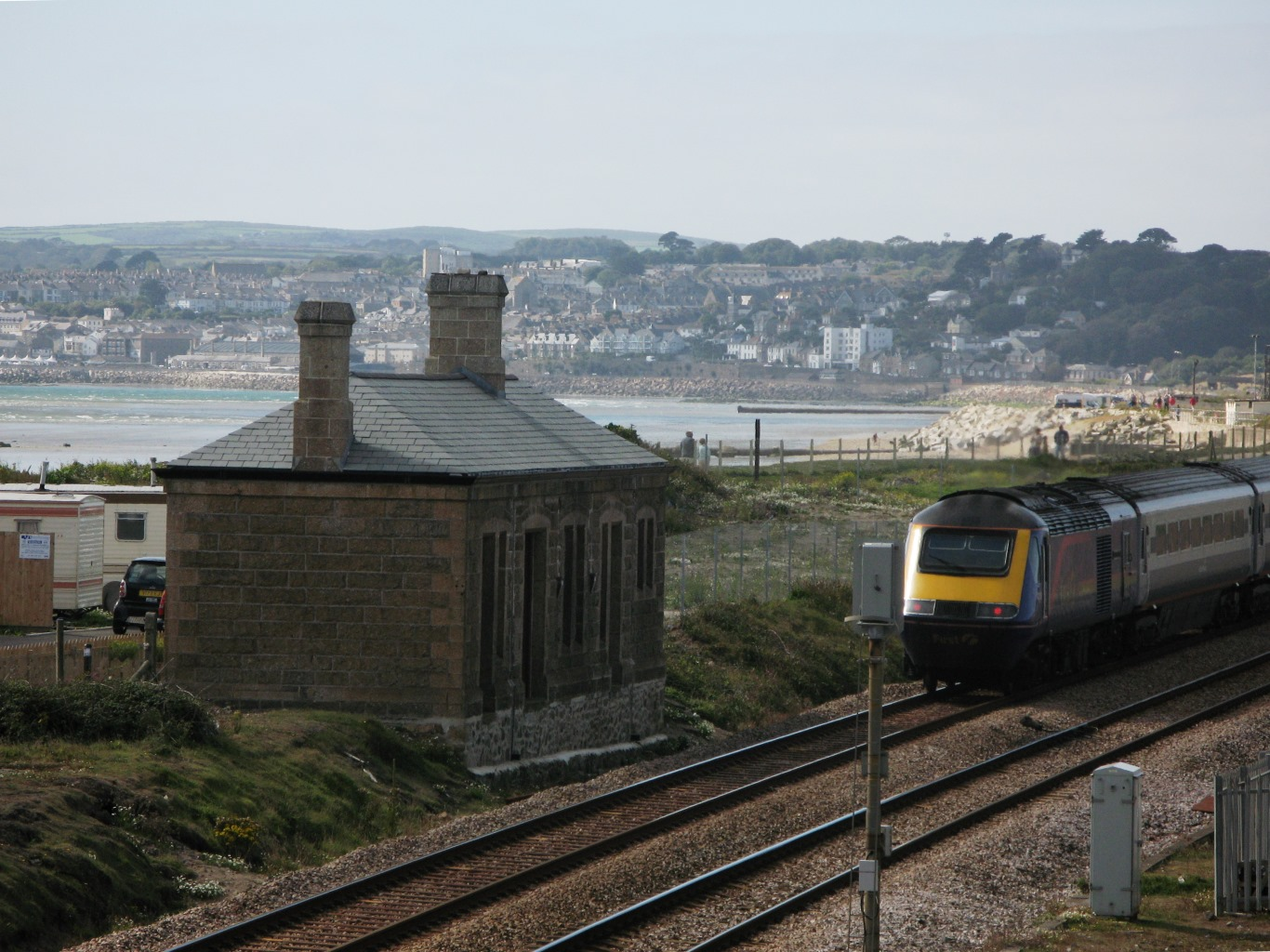
43189 passes the disused Marazion station in September 2007

A station (50.1292°N 5.4919°W) (324 miles 53 chains or 522.49 kilometres) was opened at Marazion (Cornish: Marghasyow) by the West Cornwall Railway on 11 March 1852. New waiting rooms with corrugated iron pent roofs were completed in December 1878 or January 1879. The original single platform was situated on the south side of the line but the station was rebuilt about thirty years later, when a second platform was added. The line westwards to Penzance was doubled in 1893 and the goods yard expanded so that it could share in handling the large volume of perishable traffic – fish, fruit and vegetables – from the surrounding farms and harbours. The line eastwards to St Erth was not doubled until 1929. The station closed for passengers on 5 October 1964.

The station is situated on the shore of Mount's Bay with fine views of St Michael's Mount and for many years was home to six old Pullman coaches that were formerly used as camping coaches. Three of these were rescued and restored, and now provide sleeping accommodation at Petworth railway station, which has been converted into a guest house. One was purchased privately, while the others were left to become derelict until broken up on site. In 2006 the remains of these coaches were cleared away from the site to make way for nine holiday cottages, the old station has now been fully restored into a two bedroom bungalow currently owned by the developers. The 1880s station building still stands, but part of the line westwards is currently reduced to a single track.

Preceding station	Historical railways	Following station
Penzance	Great Western Railway; Cornish Main Line	St Erth

== See also ==
Disused railway stations (Exeter to Plymouth Line)

== Sources ==
- Bennett, Alan (1990). The Great Western Railway in East Cornwall. Cheltenham: Runpast Publishing. ISBN 1-87075-411-5.
- Bennett, Alan (1988). The Great Western Railway in Mid Cornwall. Southampton: Kingfisher Railway Publications. ISBN 0-94618-453-4.
- Bennett, Alan (1988). The Great Western Railway in West Cornwall. Cheltenham: Runpast Publishing. ISBN 1-87075-412-3.
- Clinker, CR (1963). The Railways of Cornwall 1809 – 1963. Dawlish: David and Charles.
- Cooke, R A (1977). Track Layout Diagrams of the GWR and BR WR, Section 10: West Cornwall. Harwell: R A Cooke.
- Cooke, R A (1977). Track Layout Diagrams of the GWR and BR WR, Section 11: East Cornwall. Harwell: RA Cooke.
- Cooke, R A (1979). Track Layout Diagrams of the GWR and BR WR, Section 12: Plymouth. Harwell: R A Cooke.
- Heginbotham, Stephen (2010). Cornwall's Railways Remembered. Halsgrove. ISBN 978-0-85704-005-3.
- MacDermot, E T (1931). History of the Great Western Railway, volume II 1863–1921. London: Great Western Railway.
- Mitchell, David (1994). Cornwall. British Railways Past and Present. Vol. 17. Past & Present Publishing. ISBN 1-85895-060-0.
- St John Thomas, David (1973). West Country Railway History. Newton Abbot: David and Charles. ISBN 0-71536-363-8.
- Vaughan, John (2009). An Illustrated History of the Cornish Main Line. Hersham: Oxford Publishing Co. ISBN 978-0-86093-625-1.
- Pre-grouping Atlas and Gazetteer. Shepperton: Ian Allan Limited. 1976. ISBN 0-71100-320-3.
