= Camborne railway station =

Railway station in Cornwall, England

Camborne

General information
- Location: Camborne, Cornwall, England
- Coordinates: 50.210°N 5.298°W
- Grid reference: SW648396
- Manager: Great Western Railway
- Platforms: 2

Other information
- Station code: CBN
- Classification: DfT category E

History
- Original company: Hayle Railway
- Pre-grouping: Great Western Railway
- Post-grouping: Great Western Railway

Key dates
- Opened: 1843

Passengers
- 2021/22: ▲0.280 million
- 2022/23: ▲0.296 million
- 2023/24: ▲0.334 million
- 2024/25: ▲0.373 million
- 2025/26: ▲0.379 million
Location
Notes
- Passenger statistics from the Office of Rail and Road

Camborne railway station serves the town of Camborne, in Cornwall, England. It is 313 miles 40 chains (313.5 mi; 504.5 km) from London Paddington (measured via Box and the former station at Plymouth Millbay). The station is managed by Great Western Railway, which operates most services along with CrossCountry.

== History ==
The Hayle Railway opened on 23 December 1837, which was designed to move goods to and from local mines and the harbours at Hayle and Portreath. The station itself was opened in 1843 by the West Cornwall Railway with passenger services starting on 26 May of that year. The West Cornwall Railway took over the Hayle company on 3 November 1846; it extended the line westwards to Penzance and opened a new and more convenient Redruth station on 11 March 1852.

Later that year, the line was continued eastwards to a temporary station at Truro Highertown and was completed to a station at Newham Wharf in 1855.

The station buildings were replaced by some in the style used by the Great Western Railway in circa 1900. The railway was originally just a single track, with a passing loop in the station. In 1895, a second line was laid to the east and, in 1900, to the west. Goods sidings were originally laid on both sides of the station, with a goods shed behind the westbound platform. The sidings on the north side of the station were removed in 1937, which allowed the eastbound platform to be lengthened. The sidings on the south side, along with the goods shed, were taken out of use in 1965 and this platform was also extended in 1980.

Preceding station	Historical railways	Following station
Carn Brea	Great Western Railway; Cornish Main Line	Gwinear Road

== Signalling ==
Signals in the area are controlled by a signal box at Roskear Junction to the east of the town, where the signalman can oversee an adjacent level crossing. This was opened in circa 1895 and contained 29 levers. The lever frame has been removed and the box now contains individual switches on the block shelf. Its signals are identified by the code letter R.

A signal box at Camborne station had been built on the eastbound platform next to the level crossing in 1895 and but closed on 8 June 1970, since when the signalman at Roskear Junction has monitored the level crossing at Camborne by CCTV. The reason for retaining this signal box was that it also controlled the goods branch line to North Roskear, but this closed in July 1983.

== Layout and facilities ==
The station is located on Trevu Road, adjacent to a level crossing and the Railway Hotel.

Platform 1 is for westbound trains to Hayle, St Erth and Penzance. There is a car park alongside this platform and with an old railway goods shed at its end, although it is no longer used for its original purpose.

Platform 2 is served by eastbound trains to Truro, Plymouth and London Paddington.

The main station buildings are situated on platform 2, nearest to the town centre. There is a small car park behind the station buildings, which contain a booking office, café and waiting room with toilets. A level crossing passes over the line at the east end of the two platforms.

== Services ==
A pairing of Class 802 passes over the level crossing and arrives on a Penzance service

Camborne is served by two train operating companies, which provide the following general off-peak service pattern in trains per hour/day (tph/tpd):

Great Western Railway

- 2 tph to Penzance
- 2 tph to Plymouth; of which:
  - 1 tp2h continues to Exeter St Davids
  - 1 tp2h continues to London Paddington, via Exeter St Davids, Taunton and Reading

The Night Riviera sleeper:

- 1 tpd to Penzance
- 1 tpd to London Paddington.

CrossCountry:

- 2 tpd to Penzance
- 1 tpd to Edinburgh Waverley, via Bristol Temple Meads, Birmingham New Street, Leeds and York
- 1 tpd to Birmingham New Street (to Bristol Temple Meads on a Saturday and to Plymouth on a Sunday)

Preceding station	National Rail	Following station
Hayle	Great Western Railway (Cornish Main Line)	Redruth
Hayle	CrossCountry (Cornish Main Line)	Redruth
