= Hayle railway station =

Railway station in Cornwall, England

Hayle
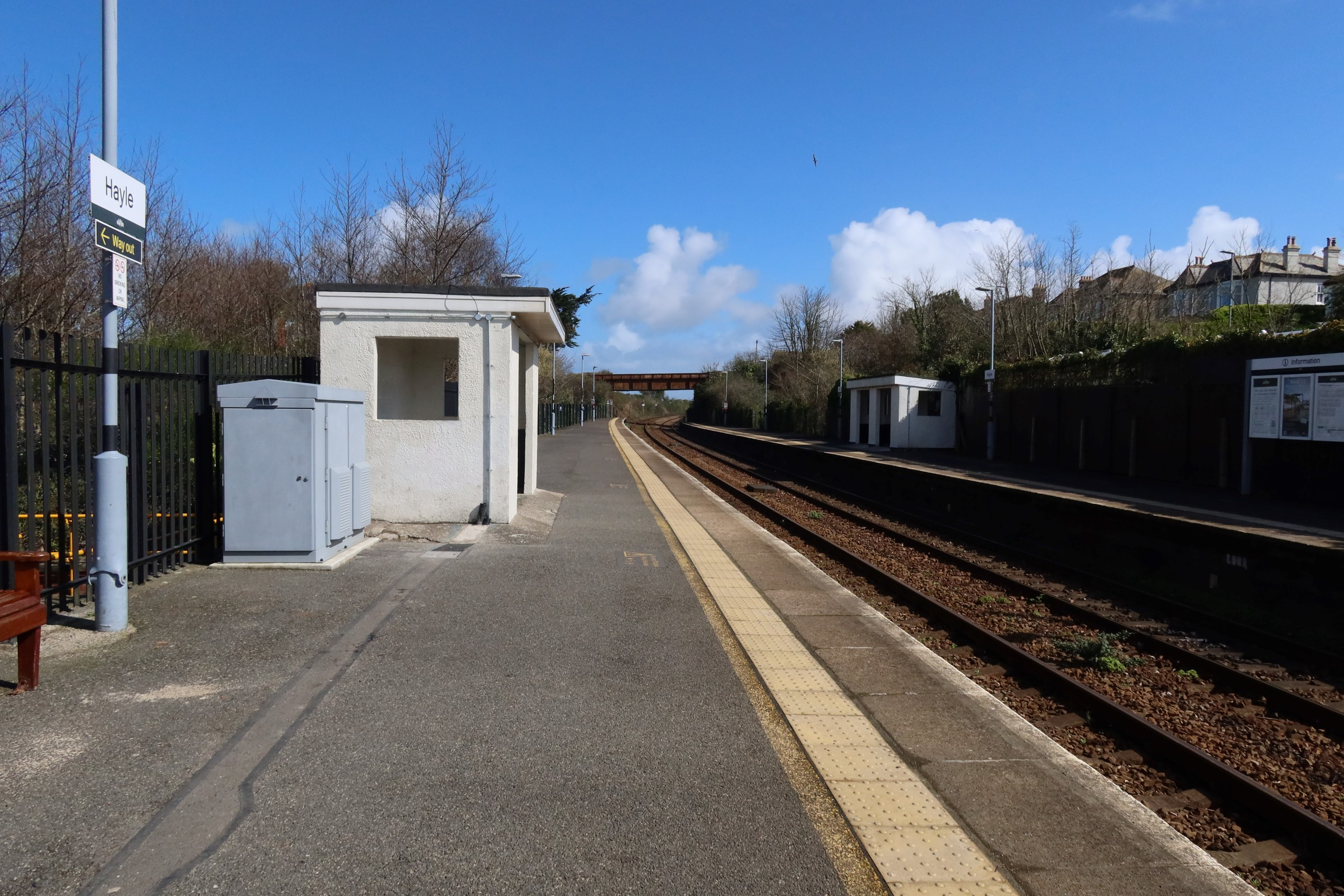
- View of platforms looking east

General information
- Location: Hayle, Cornwall; England
- Coordinates: 50.186°N 5.420°W
- Grid reference: SW559372
- Manager: Great Western Railway
- Platforms: 2

Other information
- Station code: HYL
- Classification: DfT category F1

History
- Original company: West Cornwall Railway
- Pre-grouping: Great Western Railway
- Post-grouping: Great Western Railway

Key dates
- Opened: 1852

Passengers
- 2021/22: ▲0.119 million
- 2022/23: ▲0.127 million
- 2023/24: ▲0.137 million
- 2024/25: ▲0.155 million
- 2025/26: ▲0.163 million
Location
Notes
- Passenger statistics from the Office of Rail and Road

Hayle railway station serves the small town of Hayle, Cornwall, United Kingdom. It is on the Cornish Main Line 7 miles (11 km) north-east of Penzance, 319 miles 31 chains (319.39 mi; 514.0 km) from the zero point at London Paddington measured via Box and Plymouth Millbay. Great Western Railway manage the station and provide train services alongside CrossCountry.

== History ==
The station was opened by the West Cornwall Railway on 11 March 1852 when it replaced the original Hayle Railway terminus, located in what is now the Isis RNLI Memorial Gardens. It was demolished shortly after the end of World War II.

During the 19th century, Hayle was a busy junction with goods lines running all round the town, many connecting from the embankment which is still visible behind the 'up' platform. However, the decline of shipping in the Hayle estuary meant that these freight lines were no longer of any use and were closed in 1981. Hayle signal box was closed and demolished at the same time.

Preceding station	Historical railways	Following station
St Erth	Great Western Railway; Cornish Main Line	Gwinear Road

== Description ==
The main entrance is to the platform served by trains to Penzance, which is approached by a road from Foundry Square. A footpath beneath the west end of the station allows step-free access to the other platform too, and this continues along the route of a closed railway track down towards the wharves opposite a bridge which leads across the water to the Towans.

A converted British Rail Mark 1 adjacent to the westbound platform offers holiday camping coach accommodation.

== Services ==
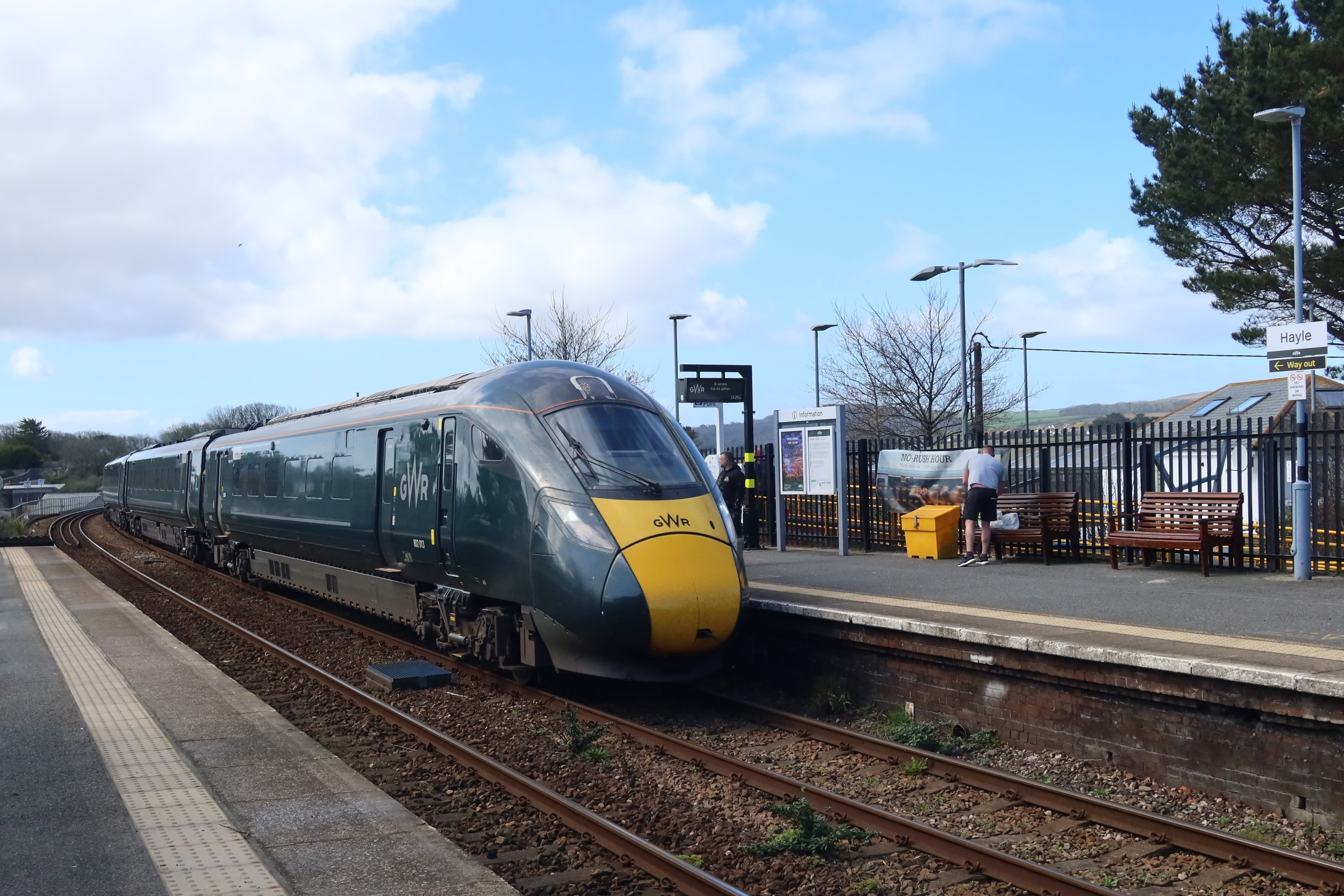
Class 802 with GWR service to Plymouth

Hayle is served by two train operating companies. Great Western Railway (GWR) provides most services:

- 1 tph to Penzance
- 1 tph to Plymouth with some services also extending to Exeter St Davids

This includes a few GWR services to and from London Paddington. The Night Riviera sleeper service only calls on the way down to Penzance.

The most recent timetable from CrossCountry sees most of their services serving Hayle. This consists of two trains a day in each direction; two to Penzance and one to Edinburgh and Birmingham New Street (Bristol Temple Meads on a Saturday and Plymouth on a Sunday). On Sundays there is one less service, with the service from Edinburgh to Penzance not serving Hayle.

Preceding station	National Rail	Following station
St Erth	Great Western Railway (Cornish Main Line)	Camborne
St Erth	CrossCountry (Cornish Main Line)	Camborne

This station offers access to the South West Coast Path
Distance to path	100 yards (91 m)
Next station anticlockwise	Lelant Saltings 2 miles (3 km)
Next station clockwise	Newquay 35 miles (56 km)
