= Angarrack =

Village in Cornwall, England

Coordinates: 50.194°N 05.386°W

Angarrack: Cornish: An Garrek
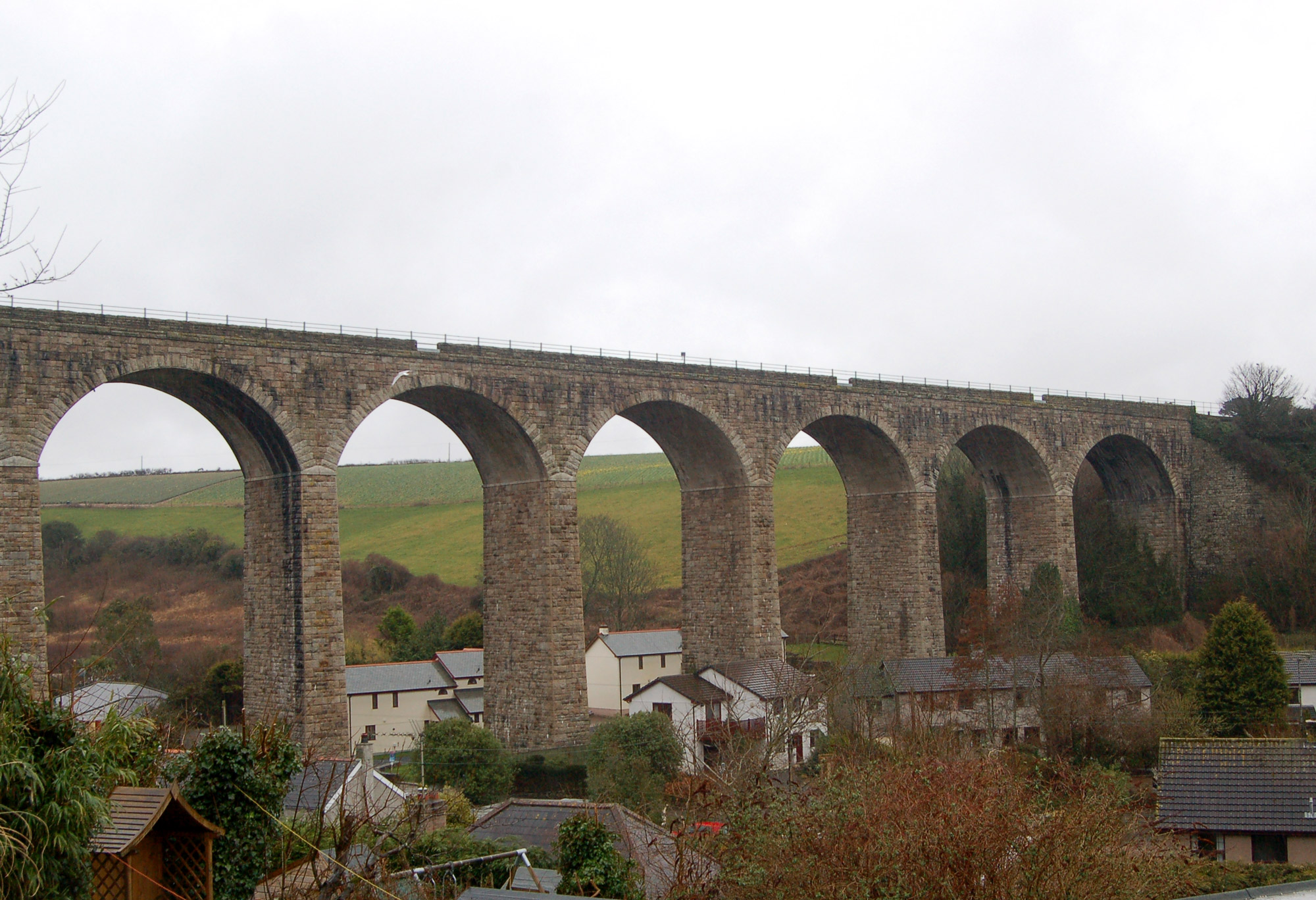
- Angarrack village under the railway viaduct

- Location within Cornwall
- OS grid reference: SW584382
- Unitary authority: Cornwall
- Ceremonial county: Cornwall
- Region: South West
- Country: England
- Sovereign state: United Kingdom
- Post town: HAYLE
- Postcode district: TR27
- Dialling code: 01736
- Police: Devon and Cornwall
- Fire: Cornwall
- Ambulance: South Western
- UK Parliament: Camborne and Redruth

Angarrack (Cornish: An Garrek, meaning The Rock) is a village in west Cornwall, UK. It is in the parish of Gwinear-Gwithian a mile to the east of Hayle. Immediately south of the village Angarrack viaduct carries the Cornish mainline railway over the Angarrack River. The name comes from An Garrek which means "The Rock" in the Cornish language. According to the Ordnance Survey the spelling is Angarrack but on signs near the village, it is variously spelled Angarrack, Angharrack, or Angarrick.

== Geography ==
Angarrack is in a narrow valley from which the Angarrack River flows before entering the Copperhouse Pool in Hayle, through a specially constructed culvert designed to prevent flooding. However, in January 2003 the flooding was severe enough to be reported on the regional television programme Spotlight. The Angarrack River joins the Hayle Estuary at Copperhouse Pool before running into the sea at St Ives Bay.

== History ==
A mill known as Melynbran was recorded in 1342 and may be the mill, Conarditone, recorded in Domesday. Angarrack is shown on maps as far back as the sixteenth century. The village was formerly a centre of industry with mining and quarrying and there were a number of mines in the valley of the Angarrack River. At the western end of the railway viaduct was the Mellanvrane mine where, before 1728, Dr John Woodward collected several specimens of tin for his mineral collection. At the eastern end of the viaduct was the Mellanoweth Mine where the North Deep Adit (a drainage and exploratory tunnel) continued to the Nanpusker Mine, further up the valley. An 1846 project to continue the adit up the valley as far as Binner Downs, just to the east of Leedstown, does not appear to have occurred.

There were also four mills on the Angarrack River. One was at Trungle; one (Angarrack Mill) was at the far end of the village on the junction of Grist Lane formally known as (the fields) and Steamer's Hill; one (Grist Mill) was situated at the northern end of the village; and one (Loggans Mill) still stands beside the Angarrack River at the eastern end of Hayle. A smelting house was built in 1704 and the mill(s) were converted into stamps to process ores from the nearby mines. The smelting house closed in 1881 and the only remaining structures are the manager's house, smith shop and tin house which have been converted to other uses

The main road between Redruth and the west once passed through Angarrack. Charles Wesley, following a visit to Redruth on 7 August 1743, was returning to St Ives via Angarrack and stopped to preach to a group of people who were at Velling-Varine (Mellenvrane). It is not known when a Methodist Society formed but the first mention is in 1779 when Angarrack was part of the Redruth Circuit. The first chapel was built in 1843 and the present chapel was built in a quarry, near the smelting house and opened on 10 April 1874. A Sunday School was added in 1889 and Vestries in 1926.

=== Hayle Railway ===
In 1834 the Hayle Railway built a 4-foot 8½ inch gauge track, over the 9.5 miles (15.3 km) from Hayle to Redruth. Above Angarrack originally horses, and from 1843 a stationary engine, hauled the trains up and down an incline. The incline can still be seen on maps and the stationary engine is commemorated in the name Steamers Hill; the road leading to Connor Downs. Following acquisition by the West Cornwall Railway a new line was constructed from Penzance to Trenowin Farm, to the east of Angarrack and the old line through Hayle and Angarrack was closed on 16 February 1852. The new line bypassed the original Hayle Station and the incline by wooden viaducts built between 1850 and 1852. The present 11-span viaduct was built in 1888 for Great Western Railway beside the original viaduct.

== See also ==
- Gwinear
- Cornwall railway viaducts
