= West Cornwall Railway =

Former railway company in Cornwall, England

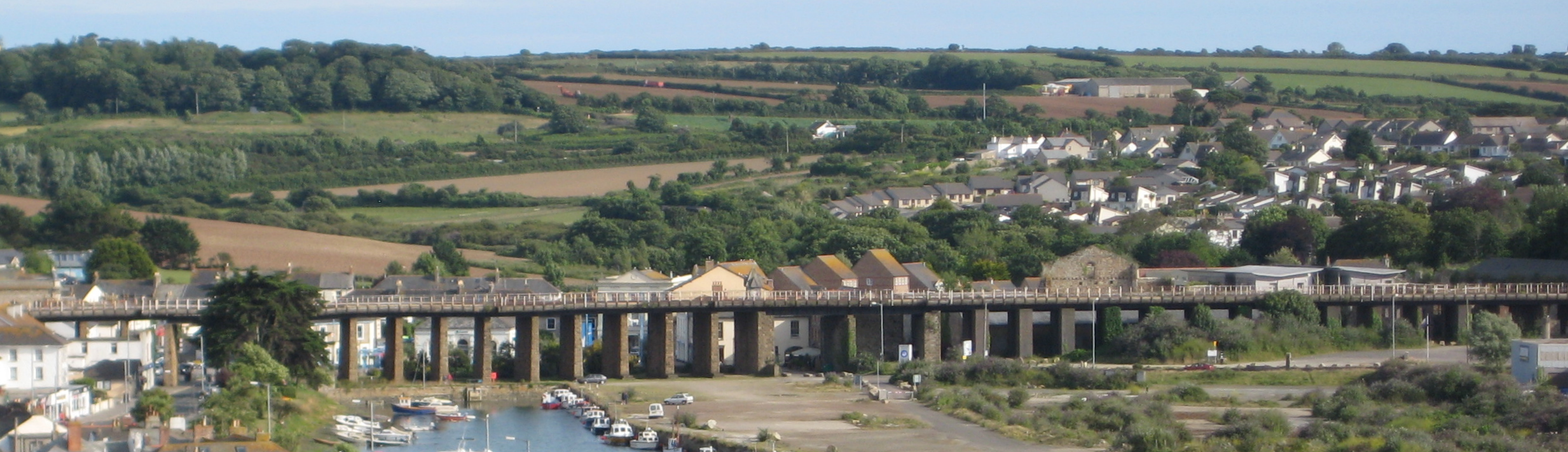
- Hayle viaduct

Overview
- Headquarters: Penzance
- Locale: United Kingdom
- Dates of operation: 1846–1947
- Successor: British Railways

Technical
- Track gauge: 7 ft (2,134 mm) (Dual gauge until 1892)
- Previous gauge: 4 ft 8 1/2 in (1,435 mm) (until 1866 and again since 1892)
- Length: 25.86 miles (41.62 km) excluding branches

The West Cornwall Railway was a railway company in Cornwall, Great Britain, formed in 1846 to construct a railway between Penzance and Truro. It purchased the existing Hayle Railway, and improved its main line, and built new sections between Penzance and Hayle, and between Redruth and Truro, and opened throughout in 1852.

When the Cornwall Railway reached Truro in 1859, rail travel between Penzance and London was possible, by changing trains.

Later, however, the West Cornwall company was called on to carry out certain mandatory improvements; it lacked the funds to undertake the work, and it was forced to sell its line to the "Associated Companies"—in effect the Great Western Railway, from 1 January 1866.

The main line of the West Cornwall Railway is still in operation at the present day, forming the western end of the Cornish Main Line railway.

== Hayle Railway ==
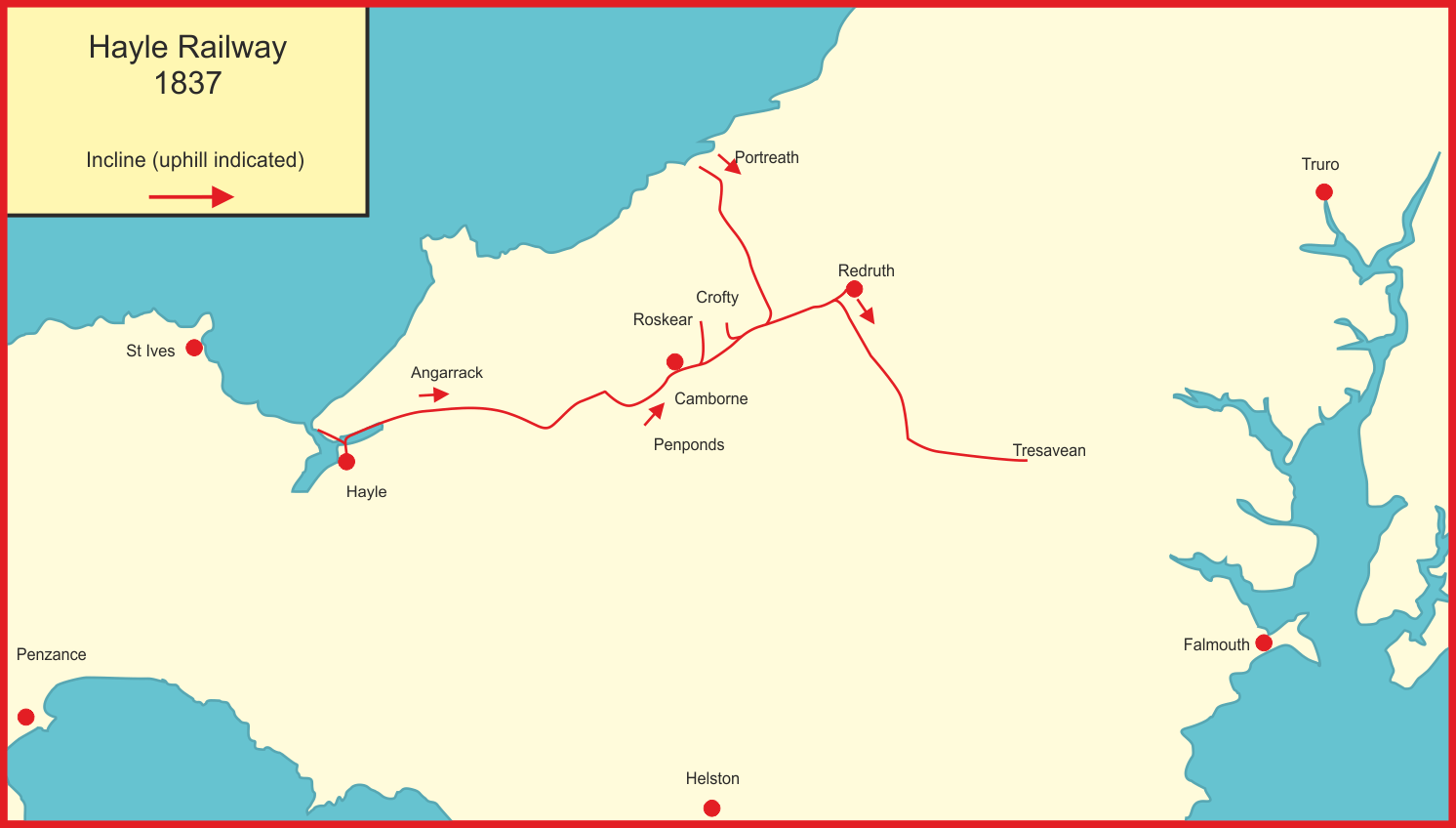
Hayle Railway System in 1837

The Hayle Railway had been opened as a mineral railway in 1837 between copper and tin mining districts near Redruth, and sea ports at Hayle and Portreath. The line was very lightly engineered, with light T-section rails on stone blocks. There were four rope-worked inclined planes on the system, which was standard gauge. Passenger traffic began to be carried on the main line between Redruth and Hayle, but the physical limitations of the system were significant.

== A scheme to connect Penzance and Truro ==
Local interests promoted a scheme to extend the Hayle Railway at each end of its main line so as to link Penzance and Truro. They formed the West Cornwall Railway Company, and their proposal was to lease the extensions to the Hayle Railway and to arrange for that company to work the whole line. The atmospheric system was proposed for the Truro to Redruth section. (In this system, stationary engines create a partial vacuum in a pipe between the rails, and vehicle at the head of the train carries a piston, entered into the pipe, to achieve traction.) The scheme was estimated at £160,000.

However a parliamentary bill in 1845 was defeated, chiefly because of concern about the delays and inconvenience due to two rope worked inclines on the main line, at Angarrack and Penponds.

West Cornwall Railway Act 1846
- Act of Parliament
- Parliament of the United Kingdom
- Long title: An Act for making a Railway from the Parish of Kenwyn in the County of Cornwall to Penzance in the same County, with Branches, to be called "The West Cornwall Railway."
- Citation: 9 & 10 Vict. c. cccxxxvi

Dates
- Royal assent: 3 August 1846

A second bill was promoted, with the West Cornwall Railway Act 1846 (9 & 10 Vict. c. cccxxxvi) receiving royal assent on 3 August 1846, giving powers to purchase the Hayle Railway and construct deviations to eliminate the inclined planes, and to complete the route between Penzance and Truro. The company's capital was to be £500,000 with borrowing powers of £165,000, and a head office in London.

The line was to be broad gauge, "subject to the liability to lay additional rails of the gauge of any railway which might thereafter be constructed through Cornwall to Truro". The main line was to be from Carvedras in Truro (close to the present-day station), with branches to the Truro River and to Falmouth, and to Penryn and to St Ives. (In fact none of the branches was built, except to Newham on the Truro River, and the line never reached Carvedras.)

Possession of the Hayle Railway was taken on 3 November 1846, the purchase price being paid in 4,000 West Cornwall shares, and by taking over the Hayle company's debts, amounting to £47,960. Money was extremely scarce at this time due to the collapse in investor confidence after the railway mania, and for some time, the new company was unable to undertake the new construction, only continuing to operate the original Hayle Railway network.

West Cornwall Railway Amendment Act 1850
- Act of Parliament
- Parliament of the United Kingdom
- Long title: An Act to enable the West Cornwall Railway Company to make a Deviation in and a Branch Railway from their authorized Line of Railway; and for other Purposes.
- Citation: 13 & 14 Vict. c. xcviii

Dates
- Royal assent: 14 August 1850

Text of statute as originally enacted

When finance became available, it was decided to build the new route sections in standard gauge, so as to avoid the expense of converting and relaying the existing Hayle Railway sections, which were already in that gauge; the West Cornwall Railway Amendment Act 1850 (13 & 14 Vict. c. xcviii) giving powers to do so was obtained. However the powers granted were conditional upon the West Cornwall laying broad gauge rails on six months' notice from any connecting broad gauge line.

Isambard Kingdom Brunel was the company's engineer, and he proposed the use of Barlow rails, a rail section with a very wide base, that was laid directly in the ballast without sleepers or other support, with a very considerable saving in first cost. This is said to be Brunel's first experiment with this rail section. As stated, the Hayle Railway's own T-section rail and stone block track was retained where appropriate but in the event "Much reconstruction [had] been necessary, and much of the old line between Hayle and Redruth [had] been relaid." Several new viaducts were required, including Angarrack and Penponds, in each case on account of the deviation to by-pass the inclines.

By February 1852 the route was practically ready between Redruth and Penzance, and on 16 February 1852 the former Hayle Railway section was closed to enable the final connections to be made. On 25 February a locomotive was seen in Penzance for the first time, and on 27 February the chairman and directors made a trial inspection run from Redruth (Hayle Railway station) to Penzance. Formalities were completed and the line was ready for opening.

== The new line opens ==
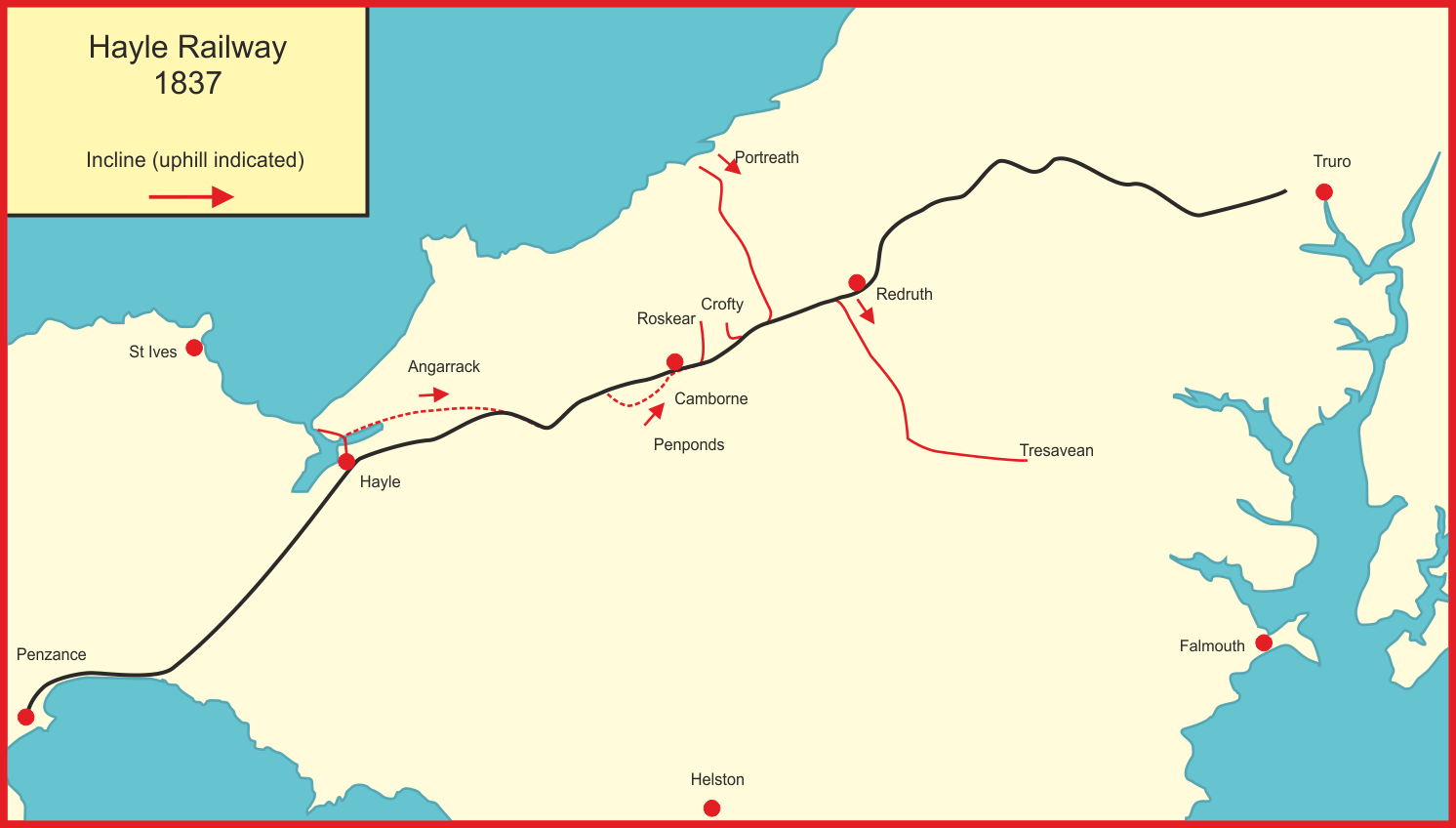
West Cornwall Railway System in 1852

On 11 March 1852, the West Cornwall main line was opened between Penzance and the new Redruth station, without ceremony. The West Briton and Cornwall Advertiser newspaper, which had reported the directors' inspection run in detail, did not record the opening, although an accident at Hayle on 17 March was reported. The opening was announced in the Royal Cornwall Gazette on 12 March 1852 but only by publication of the timetable, rather than a description of the opening ceremony. Three passenger trains a day ran, with two on Sundays; the third class single fare from Redruth to Penzance was 1s 4d (equivalent to £8.09 in 2025). The first class return from Redruth to Penzance was 4s 6d (equivalent to £27.16 in 2025).

Good progress was also being made with the construction of the eastern end of the route, and on 25 August 1852 there was a grand ceremonial opening of that part of the line, as far as Higher Town, on the western margin of Truro.

== Infrastructure ==
The main line was in new construction from Penzance to a point near Trenowin Farm, east of Angarrack, then using the Hayle Railway route to near the Redruth station, but with a short new section to by-pass the Penponds inclined plane. From Redruth there was new construction (with a new, more central station at that town) to a terminal station about a mile west of Truro. This was at Higher Town, but its official name was Truro Road, although MacDermot uses the name Higher Town.

The Hayle Railway branches were retained, but the line crossed the centre of Hayle on a viaduct, and the Hayle Railway terminus in Foundry Square was abandoned; a new connection descending on a gradient of 1 in 30 was provided to maintain access from the new line to the Hayle wharves; a short length of the original main line from Hayle to near Phillack north of Copperhouse Pool was also retained to serve works there.

Gradients on the new route were severe, with long climbs at 1 in 60 in the up direction and 1 in 80 in the down direction. Several new viaducts were required, and these were mostly timber trestles to Brunel's design, although mostly more lightly built than his other designs.

The Hayle Railway branches were retained, and continued with T section rails on stone blocks.

== Better access to Truro ==
The high ground on which Truro is located had prevented the new line from approaching directly, but the Higher Town terminus was inconvenient; powers were obtained to extend the line to Newham, within the city of Truro and on the western bank of the Truro River, an arm of the River Fal. The new line made a broad southerly sweep and approached from the south. Its extent was about 2 1/2 miles (4 km), and it was opened on 16 April 1855. It diverged from the line towards Truro Road a little south of that station, and the Truro Road station was disused from that date.

== The Cornwall Railway arrives ==
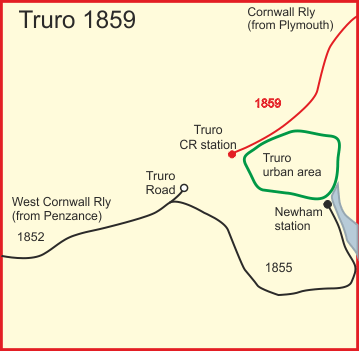
Truro railways in 1859

The Cornwall Railway was constructed to connect Plymouth and Falmouth, through Truro, as a broad gauge line. It opened from Plymouth as far as a new, more conveniently located station in Truro on the northern margin of the city in May 1859.

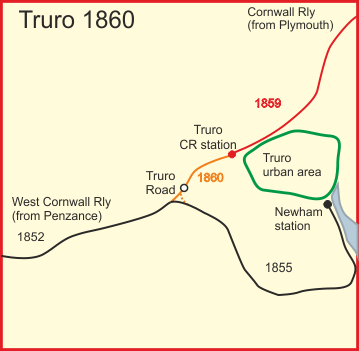
Truro railways in 1860

Pursuing the object of reaching Falmouth, it constructed a line westward, involving a short tunnel, as far as the dormant West Cornwall station at Truro Road. It laid a single line of standard gauge rails from its own station to make an end-on connection with the West Cornwall line, enabling West Cornwall trains to reach the Cornwall Railway station. This was opened in August 1860, enabling for the first time rail travel throughout from Penzance to London, but with a break of gauge at Truro. (This required passengers to change trains, and goods had to be physically transshipped into different wagons.)

From that time most West Cornwall passenger trains used the Cornwall Railway station, but the first westbound and last eastbound train of the day continued to use Newham until November 1863. From that time all passenger trains used the Cornwall Railway station, and Newham became a goods station.

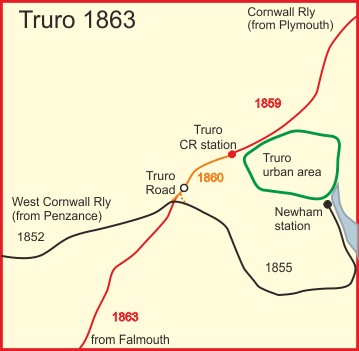
Truro railways in 1863

The Cornwall Railway continued its construction towards Falmouth, and opened that line on 24 August 1863. This included an independent track from its Truro station paralleling its standard gauge track to the West Cornwall, and diverging at Higher Town. Its broad gauge line crossed the West Cornwall's standard gauge Newham branch on the level; the junction was known as Penwithers Junction.

A contemporary engineer's report stated that "an extensive system of signal mechanism has been erected" at the crossing, indicating that a signal interlocking was installed there; this was the first west of Exeter if not Bristol, according to MacDermot.

The topography at Penwithers Junction clearly shows that earthworks for an east curve were formed. This would have allowed through running from Newham towards the Cornwall Railway station at Truro. MacDermot states that this was formed at this time by the West Cornwall company, but that it was never completed.

== A call to lay broad gauge rails ==
West Cornwall Railway Act 1865
- Act of Parliament
- Parliament of the United Kingdom
- Long title: An Act to authorize the West Cornwall Railway Company to enter into Working Arrangements with other Companies, and to lease or sell their Railway; and for other Purposes.
- Citation: 28 & 29 Vict. c. ccxix

Dates
- Royal assent: 5 July 1865

Text of statute as originally enacted

The Cornwall Railway was a broad gauge line, and there was an inconvenient break of gauge at Truro. In 1864 it gave notice to the West Cornwall company requiring it to lay broad gauge rails throughout; this was in accordance with the 1850 West Cornwall powers. The West Cornwall was quite unable to finance the required work, and had no alternative but to look for a buyer. In fact the only realistic buyer was the "Associated Companies", a group composed of the Great Western Railway, the Bristol and Exeter Railway and the South Devon Railway. The sale went through, and the Associated Companies took over the working of the line from 1 July 1865, and completed the purchase on 1 January 1866.

== Under the control of the Great Western Railway ==
The Associated Companies were in effect the Great Western Railway. A West Cornwall Committee was formed, consisting of two former West Cornwall directors and two Great Western directors to manage the line under Associated Companies ownership.

They then proceeded with the work of laying broad gauge rails (i.e. converting the main line to mixed gauge) and to improving the very poor quality infrastructure on the West Cornwall main lines. Broad gauge goods trains started running on 6 November 1866 and passenger trains from 1 March 1867, with two through London services each way daily.

Some standard gauge trains continued to run, and from November 1871 until the abolition of broad gauge, some goods trains ran as mixed trains, conveying wagons of both gauges in the same train.

The Associated Companies amalgamated as the Great Western Railway in 1876 and the West Cornwall system was then formally a part of that company.

The West Cornwall line was still in a weak condition, with timber trestle viaducts and poor quality track; Barlow rail and the original T-section rail on stone blocks persisted on the original branches, and the line was single throughout. The branches all remained standard gauge only (except for a mixed gauge deviation on Hayle Wharves, opened on 3 October 1877).

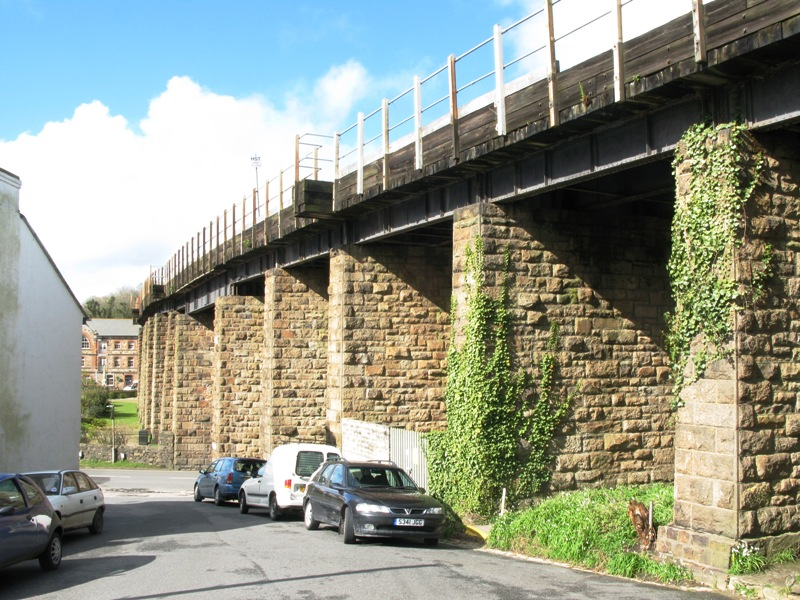
Hayle Viaduct in modern times

The timber trestle viaducts were replaced by masonry or by masonry and iron structures in the period 1885–1888, with the exception of the Penzance viaduct. This was largely washed away on 31 December 1868, and the railway was diverted inland until a new viaduct was completed, opening on 28 October 1871.

In May 1892 the Great Western Railway undertook the upheaval of gauge conversion, in which all broad gauge lines were converted to standard gauge. The West Cornwall system was already mixed gauge, so this only implied eventual removal of the unnecessary broad gauge rails. The opportunity was taken to reconfigure the track at Penwithers Junction, where the Falmouth line crossed the Newham line on the level. There had been two independent tracks from Truro, one standard gauge leading to the West Cornwall line, and one broad, leading towards Falmouth. From 1893 the two single tracks were converted to form a double line, with a full junction at Penwithers for the divergence of the Penzance and Falmouth lines. At the same time the Newham branch, now only carrying local goods for Truro, was directly accessible only from the Falmouth line.

Doubling of the single line sections started, and by 1904 nearly 11 miles (18 km) of the 25-mile (40 km) West Cornwall main line had been doubled: Chacewater to Scorrier, Redruth to Gwinear Road, Hayle to St Erth, and Marazion to Ponsandane (near Penzance). By 1921 only Scorrier to Redruth and St Erth to Marazion remained single.

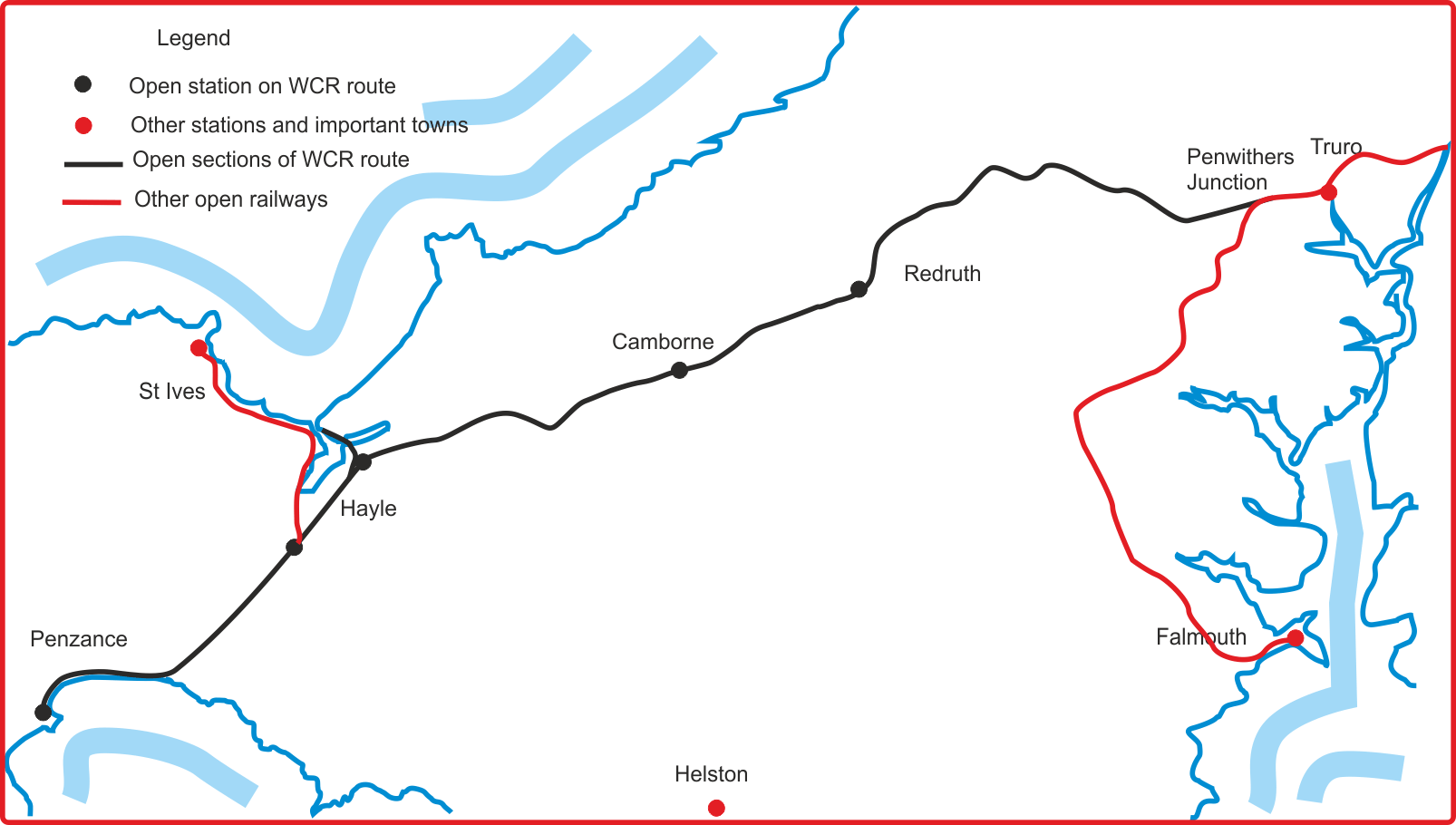
Active sections of the West Cornwall Railway at the present day

The reconstructed Penzance viaduct of 1871 had 51 spans, originally of timber construction but with some later steel strengthening. In 1920 the viaduct was replaced with a stone faced embankment carrying double track. The Penzance station site remained very cramped, with only two short passenger platforms, and in 1937 a new goods station was opened at Ponsandane, just outside Penzance, serving the whole catchment area of Penzance, about 100 square miles (260 km^{2}), motor cartage having been introduced. This freed space at Penzance itself for enlargement of the passenger facilities there, and a considerable area of the foreshore was reclaimed at the eastern end of the station. This incorporated a new extended sea wall and in collaboration with the town corporation, a public promenade was formed on it.

This enabled the passenger station to be extended to have four long platforms, and new loading banks for fish and flower traffic were built to remove these activities from the passenger station. The work was completed in 1938.

The original West Cornwall Railway branches continued in operation, but closed during the twentieth century; the Portreath and Tresavean branches closed in 1936; North Crofty closed in 1948; Roskear in 1963; Newham in 1972 and Hayle Wharves and the Phillack stub in 1982.

The main line from Penzance to Truro continues as part of the Cornish Main Line to this day.

== Stations ==
The Hayle Railway had operated passenger calling points at Redruth, Pool, Camborne, Penponds, Gwinear, Angarrack, Copperhouse and Hayle. When the West Cornwall Railway opened its new line and then extended to Newham, it had stations at

- Newham (Truro); opened 1855, reduced to goods station only in 1863, closed in 1971
- Truro Road; sometimes known as Higher Town; opened 1852; closed 1855
- Chacewater; opened 1852; closed 1964
- Scorrier Gate; opened 1896, closed 1964
- Redruth; opened 1852
- Pool; renamed Carn Brea in 1875; closed to passengers in 1961; it was also the location of the railway's workshops
- Camborne
- Gwinear Road; this was the former Gwinear station of the Hayle Railway; it became the junction for the Helston Railway branch from 1887, and it closed in 1964
- Angarrack; a new station corresponding to the Hayle Railway station; it closed in 1853
- Hayle
- St Ives Road; renamed St Erth in 1877, when it became the junction for the newly opened branch line to St Ives
- Marazion Road; renamed Marazion from 1896, and closed in 1964
- Penzance

Note:

- When the Cornwall Railway connected its Truro station with the West Cornwall line in 1870, most West Cornwall Railway passenger trains were diverted to it; however it was wholly owned and operated by the Cornwall Railway company.
- The Hayle Railway terminus at Redruth was by-passed by the West Cornwall main line, and was reduced to the status of a goods station; it eventually closed in 1967.
- Copperhouse Halt was opened by the Great Western Railway in 1905; it was located between Angarrack and Hayle, and it was closed in 1908.
- Dulcoath Halt was opened by the Great Western Railway in 1905; it was located between Carn Brea and Camborne, and it was closed in 1908.

== Major structures ==
The Hayle Railway had not had any large structures, and all the viaducts on the new West Cornwall Railway line were built new by them in the period 1850–1852. They were of Brunel's timber trestle designs. When the Associated Companies took control of the line and installed broad gauge, they were reconstructed, and they were eventually replaced in brick arch or brick pier and wrought iron. They were:

- Penwithers Viaduct, 124 yards (113 m) long, replaced in 1887
- Chacewater Viaduct, 99 yards (91 m) long, replaced in 1888
- Blackwater Viaduct (east of Chacewater), 132 yards (121 m) long, replaced in 1888
- Redruth Viaduct, 163 yards (149 m) long, replaced in 1888
- Penponds Viaduct, 291 yards (266 m) long, replaced 1888
- Angarrack Viaduct, 266 yards (243 m) long, replaced in 1885
- Guildford Viaduct (east of Hayle station), 128 yards (117 m) long, replaced in 1886
- Hayle Viaduct, 277 yards (253 m) long, replaced 1886
- Penzance Viaduct, 347 yards (317 m) long, reconstructed in 1871 and replaced by a double track embankment in 1921.

Note: some of the viaduct lengths are uncertain.

== Locomotives ==
=== Standard gauge ===
The Hayle Railway contracted with J. Chanter to provide its locomotives. This contract was bought out by the West Cornwall Railway, the stock consisting of the Carn Brea, Chanter, Cornubria, Coryndon, and Pendarves.

These locomotives were replaced from 1851 by an expanded fleet comprising:

- Apollo (1866–1881), an ex-London and North Western Railway 0-6-0 (Great Western Railway (GWR) no. 1388)
- Camborne (1852–1865), a Stothert and Slaughter 0-4-2T
- Carn Brea (1853–1866), a Stothert and Slaughter 0-4-2
- Ceres (1875–1881), an ex-London and North Western Railway 0-6-0 (GWR no. 1390)
- Cyclops (1874–1881), an ex-London and North Western Railway 0-6-0 (GWR no. 1389)
- Falmouth (1855–1881) a Robert Stephenson and Company 2-4-0 (GWR no. 1384)
- Fox (1872–1912), an Avonside Engine Company 0-4-0T (GWR no. 1391)
- Hayle (1853–1866), a Stothert and Slaughter 0-4-2T
- Helston (1860–1868), a Robert Stephenson 2-4-0 (GWR no. 917)
- Ironsides (1852–?)
- Mars (1866–1881), a Vulcan Foundry 0-6-0T (GWR no. 1386)
- Mounts Bay (1853–1868), a Robert Stephenson and Company 2-4-0 (GWR no. 915)
- Nestor (1865–1881), an ex-London and North Western Railway 0-6-0 (GWR no. 1387)
- Penwith (1853–1872), a Sothert and Slaughter 2-4-0
- Penzance (1851–?), a Stothert and Slaughter 0-4-2T
- Penzance (1860–1868), a Robert Stephenson 2-4-0 (GWR no. 916)
- Redruth (1852–?), a Robert Stephenson 2-4-0
- Redruth (1865–1871), a Slaughter and Grunning 0-6-0
- St Just (1865–1881), a Robert Stephenson and Company 0-6-0 (GWR no. 1385)
- St Ives (1855–1868), a Robert Stephenson and Company 2-4-0 (GWR no 918)
- Truro (1852–1873), a Robert Stephenson and Company 2-4-0

=== Broad gauge ===
Broad gauge locomotives were pooled with the Cornwall Railway and South Devon Railway locomotives, those bought on behalf of the West Cornwall Railway being:

- Gorgon class 4-4-0STs
  - Pluto (1866–1892) GWR no. 2123
  - Titan (1866–1886) GWR no. 2126
  - Zebra (1866–1892) GWR no. 2127
- Remus class 0-6-0STs
  - Remus (1866–1886) GWR no. 2154
  - Romulus (1866–1892) GWR no. 2155
- ex-Llynvi Valley Railway 0-6-0STs
- Ada (1868–1884) GWR no. 2146
- Rosa (1868–1885) GWR no. 2145 (ran as a 4-4-0ST until 1874)
- Una (1868–1886) GWR no. 2147

In addition, two West Cornwall Railway locomotives were rebuilt to run on the broad gauge.

- Penwith (1872–1888) 2-4-0T GWR no. 2136
- Redruth (1871–1887) 0-6-0ST GWR no. 2156
