= Penzance railway station =

Railway station in Cornwall, England

Penzance Pennsans
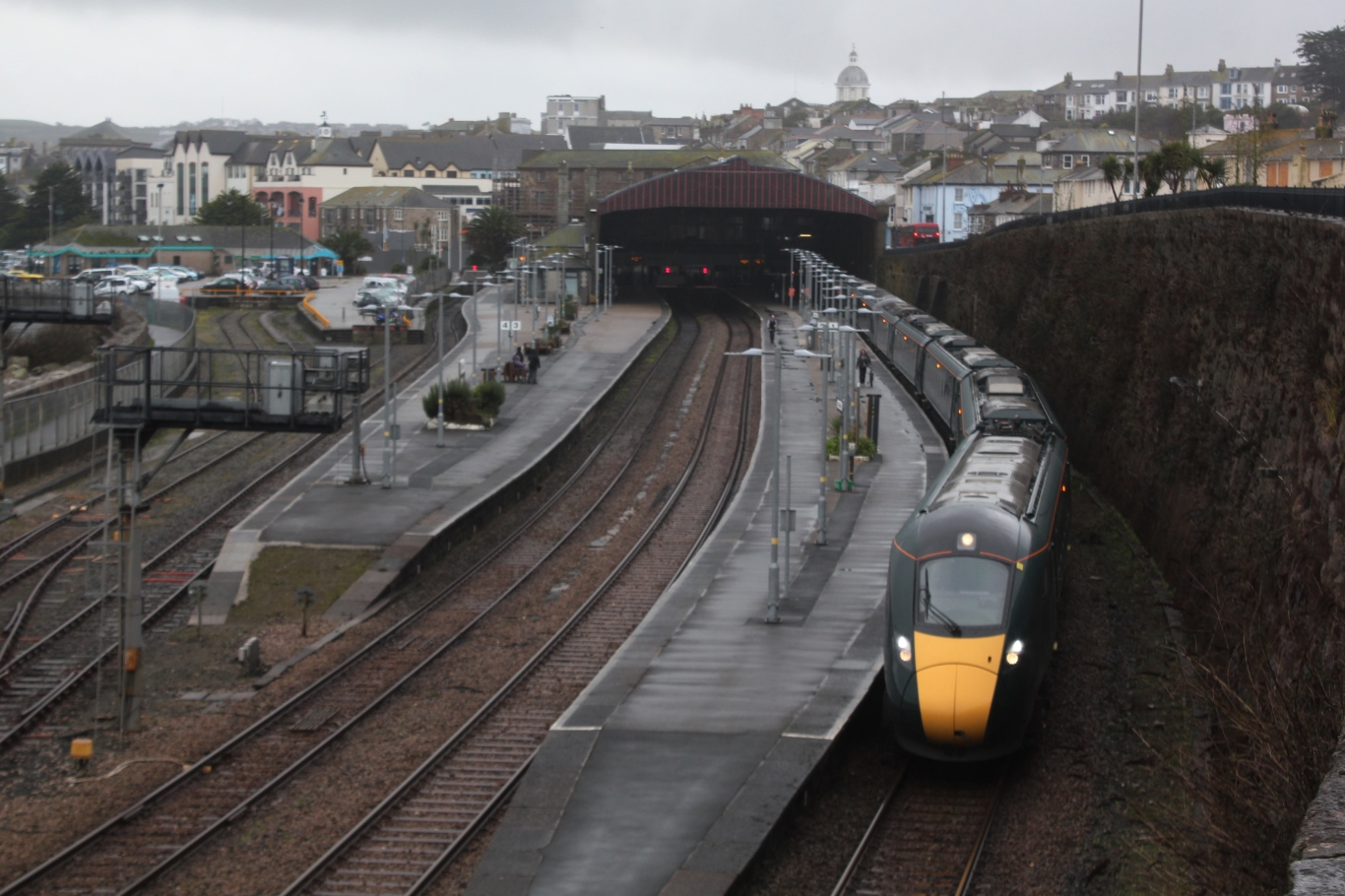

General information
- Location: Penzance, Cornwall; England
- Coordinates: 50.122°N 5.533°W
- Grid reference: SW475306
- Manager: Great Western Railway
- Platforms: 4

Other information
- Station code: PNZ
- Classification: DfT category C1

History
- Original company: West Cornwall Railway
- Pre-grouping: Great Western Railway
- Post-grouping: Great Western Railway

Key dates
- Opened: 1852

Passengers
- 2021–2022: ▲0.516 million
- Interchange: ▲4,472
- 2022–2023: ▲0.565 million
- Interchange: ▼2,604
- 2023–2024: ▲0.619 million
- Interchange: ▲4,446
- 2024–2025: ▲0.685 million
- Interchange: ▲4,548
- 2025–2026: ▲0.730 million
- Interchange: ▼260
Location

Penzance railway station (Cornish: Pennsans) serves the town of Penzance in west Cornwall, England. It is the terminus of the Cornish Main Line and the southernmost railway station in Great Britain, situated at milepost 326.5 miles (525.5 km) from London Paddington. The station is owned by Network Rail and managed by Great Western Railway, which also operates train services together with CrossCountry. It is the southernmost railway station in Great Britain.

The first station opened in 1852; through travel to and from London commenced from 1859, with the opening of the Royal Albert Bridge. The station was rebuilt by the Great Western Railway in 1876 and the current layout was the result of a further rebuilding in the 1930s.

== History ==
=== Broad gauge era ===
The station was opened by the West Cornwall Railway on 11 March 1852 as the terminus of its line from Redruth. The station itself consisted of a single platform face, and along with the rest of the West Cornwall Railway was laid as standard gauge. This changed in 1866 when the West Cornwall Railway was relaid to mixed gauge allowing South Devon Railway Leopard class locomotive Lance to bring in the first broad gauge train which carried dignitaries from Truro, although the small station with the single platform remained with little other alteration. A siding extended beyond the goods shed and ran along Albert Quay.

In 1876, the Great Western Railway took over the West Cornwall Railway and a major redevelopment was undertaken. An enlarged goods shed was built and the wooden passenger buildings were replaced by a much larger station built in rock-faced granite to a design by William Lancaster Owen. The total cost was around £15,000 (equivalent to £1,610,000 in 2025) which included the 250ft by 80ft roof which cost £5,000 for the iron and the 50 tons of glass. The new station had the booking office at street level, with the two platforms linked by a staircase, and was used for the first time on 18 November 1879. However, the new station suffered from teething problems because, by 1880, it was reported that some settlement in the masonry and shrinkage of the iron in the roof had caused several sheets of the glazing to break.

The blocked-up archway in the wall that retains the hillside behind the platforms was used by the railway as a coal store.

In 1892, station was converted from broad gauge to standard gauge. At the same time, work was undertaken to widen and extend both the two platforms, and a fourth road was laid in the station.

=== After 1892 ===
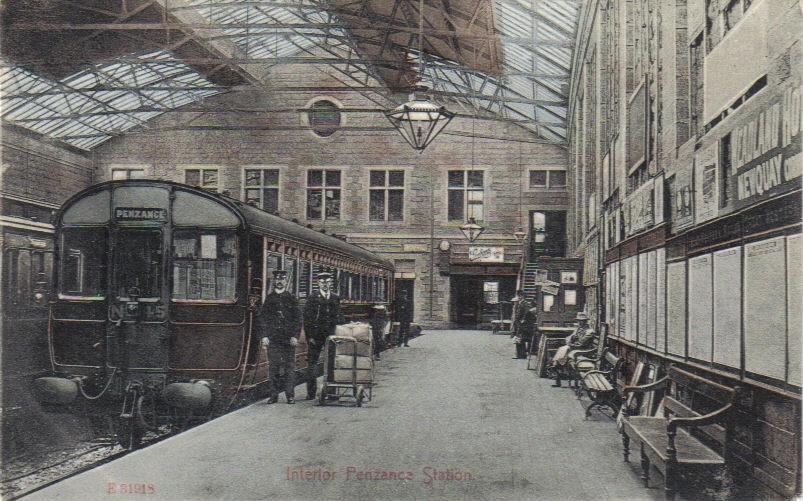
Inside the second station c. 1915, a Steam Rail Motor waits to depart

Following grouping, about 60 staff were employed at Penzance station by the 1930s. In 1937, the GWR were granted permission to reclaim land from the sea, permitting a significant enlargement of the station with the capacity being doubled with two platforms providing four platform faces, three of which were under the main roof.

The last British Railways steam train to Penzance was a railtour hauled by West Country class 34002 Salisbury on 3 May 1964.

The WCR station had a disc-and-crossbar signal on the end of the single platform; this was common on the GWR and associated companies. This was replaced by the familiar semaphore signals, and these were replaced in turn by colour light signals in 1982.

Further alterations were made in 1983, when a new ticket office and buffet were opened. The 1983 refurbishment also included the replacement of the lantern roof with a different design.

The longest distance train service in the United Kingdom for many years ran from Aberdeen to Penzance with a journey time of around 13 hours. Since May 2025 the service only runs between Aberdeen and Plymouth.

In 2012–13, the station's roof was refurbished.

Preceding station	Historical railways	Following station
Terminus	Great Western Railway; Cornish Main Line	Marazion

== Description ==
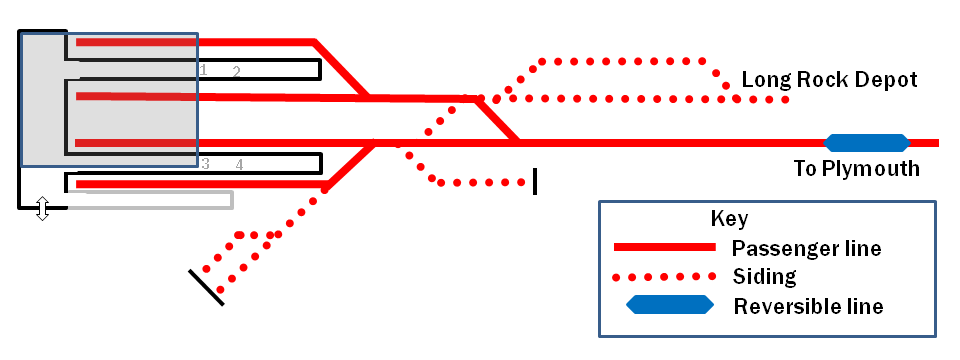
The station layout

Platforms 1, 2 and 3 are within the main train shed; platform 4 is on the south side, in the open air. A large stone at the end of this platform welcomes people to Penzance in both English and Cornish. This side of the station is built on the sea wall near the harbour; the other side is cut into the hillside.

There is only one line between the station and Marazion. There were two tracks until 1974 but now trains in both directions use the former down line (closest to the sea) while the former up line is only used as a siding for access to Ponsandane sidings and Long Rock Depot.

The station's concourse is within the main train shed, housing a ticket office, a ticket machine and a waiting room. There is a kiosk at the front of the station serving food and drink. At the north end of the concourse there is a customer lounge with snack and drink facilities for customers holding a first-class ticket and shower rooms for customers holding a cabin ticket for the Night Riviera.

== Passengers ==
Penzance has consistently had more than half a million passengers arriving or departing every year since 2008. During the COVID-19 pandemic in 2020 it dropped to 190,426 but passengers volumes exceeded the pre-COVID levels again by 2023. In 2025–2026 they were 730,268.

Passengers by year
Year (Note: The passenger data covers twelve month periods that start in April.)	Entries and exits	Interchanges
1997–1998	372,343	No data
1998–1999	393,985	No data
1999–2000	406,236	3,550
2000–2001	373,090	2,298
2001–2002	396,971	2,417
2002–2003	392008	No data
2003–2004	No data	No data
2004–2005	403,000	2,132
2005–2006	413,905	748
2006–2007	461,764	699
2007–2008	498,290	365
2008–2009	526,132	49
2009–2010	520,982	200
2010–2011	556,546	22
2011–2012	580,238	117
2012–2013	562,992	108
2013–2014	533,258	32
2014–2015	549,730	172
2015–2016	543,036	174
2016–2017	560,338	17
2017–2018	568,836	1,384
2018–2019	570,098	1,598
2019–2020	573,718	4,226
2020–2021 (Note: Passenger numbers were reduced during 2020 due to the COVID-19 pandemic in the United Kingdom.)	190,426	1,370
2021–2022	515,600	4,472
2022–2023	564,724	2,604
2023–2024	618,956	4,446
2024–2025	685,470	4,548
2025–2026	730,268	260

== Services ==
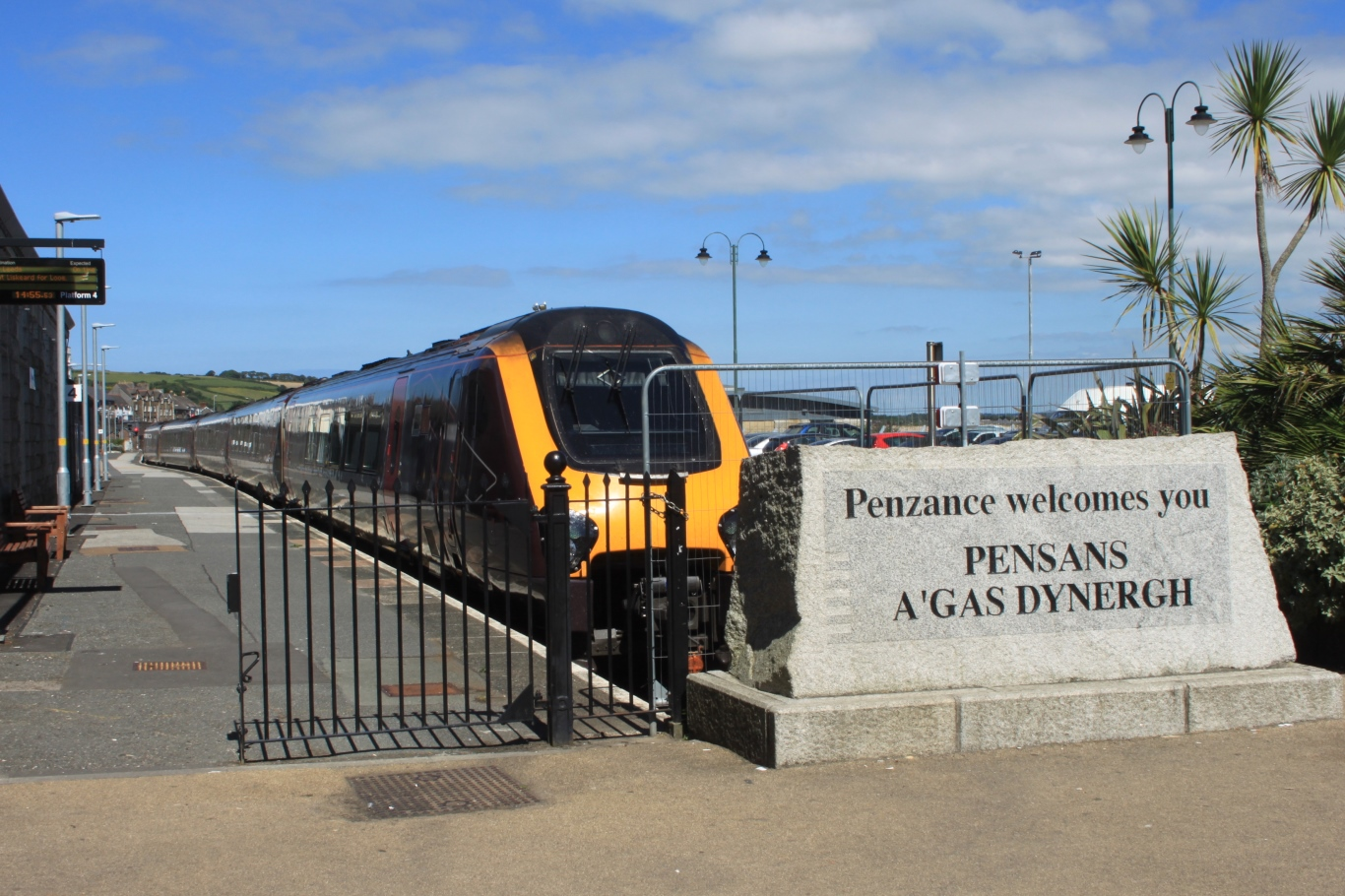
A CrossCountry Super Voyager at platform 4

Penzance is served by two train operating companies, which provide the following general off-peak service pattern in trains per hour/day:

Great Western Railway

- 2 tph to and from Plymouth; with extensions in certain services to and from Exeter St Davids as well as to and from London Paddington, via Exeter St Davids, Taunton and Reading. This includes the Night Riviera sleeper which operates Sundays to Fridays nights to and from London Paddington
- 1 train per day to St Ives

CrossCountry:

- 2 daily arrivals, one of which comes from Edinburgh Waverley
- 2 daily departures, one going as far as Edinburgh Waverley

Preceding station	National Rail	Following station
Terminus	Great Western Railway; Cornish Main Line	St Erth
Terminus	CrossCountry; Cornish Main Line	St Erth

=== Freight and mail ===
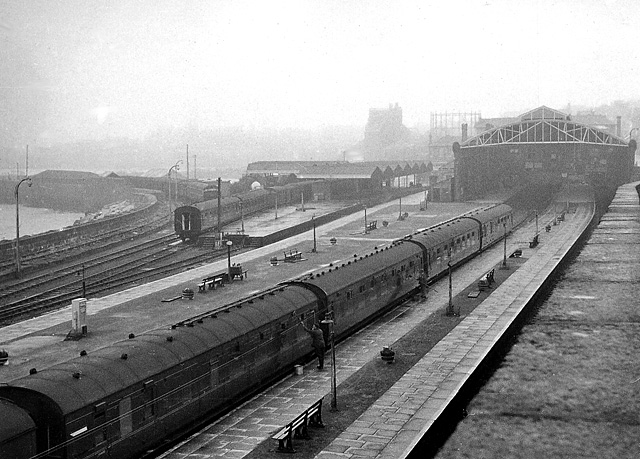
Penzance in 1958 showing the freight area beyond platform 4

The WCR station had both a goods shed and a locomotive shed between the passenger station and the sea; when a fire destroyed the goods shed in 1876, the building was enlarged considerably incorporating the original locomotive shed which had been replaced by one on the opposite side of the line near the end of the retaining wall, which in turn was replaced by the new Penzance Traction Maintenance Depot outside the station at Long Rock. In the first decade of the 20th century, Penzance was typically handling 45,000 tons of goods each year.

In November 1882, there were complaints about the paving, rail tracks and the difficulty for traffic to pass on the Albert Pier. The Borough Council requested the Railway Company to replace the paving with granite setts before relaying the rails.

When the expansion of 1937 doubled the number of platform faces, the fourth face was outside the overall roof; this was used for mail and parcels traffic as access to the road was provided.

== Cultural references ==
The station was featured in Episode 1 of All the Stations in 2017, the first station that presenters Geoff Marshall and Vicki Pipe visited on their journey.

== Bibliography ==
- Vaughan, John (2009). An Illustrated History of the Cornish Main Line. OPC. ISBN 978-0-86093-625-1.
- Mitchell, David (1994). British Railways past and present: Cornwall. Vol. 17. Peterborough: Past & Present publishing. ISBN 1-85895-060-0.
- "Travel Centre". Rail Enthusiast. EMAP National Publications. October 1982. p. 52. ISSN 0262-561X. OCLC 49957965.

This station offers access to the South West Coast Path
Distance to path	50 yards (46 m)
Next station anticlockwise	Falmouth Docks 60 miles (97 km)
Next station clockwise	St Ives 41 miles (66 km)
