= Hayle Railway =

Former railway in Cornwall, England

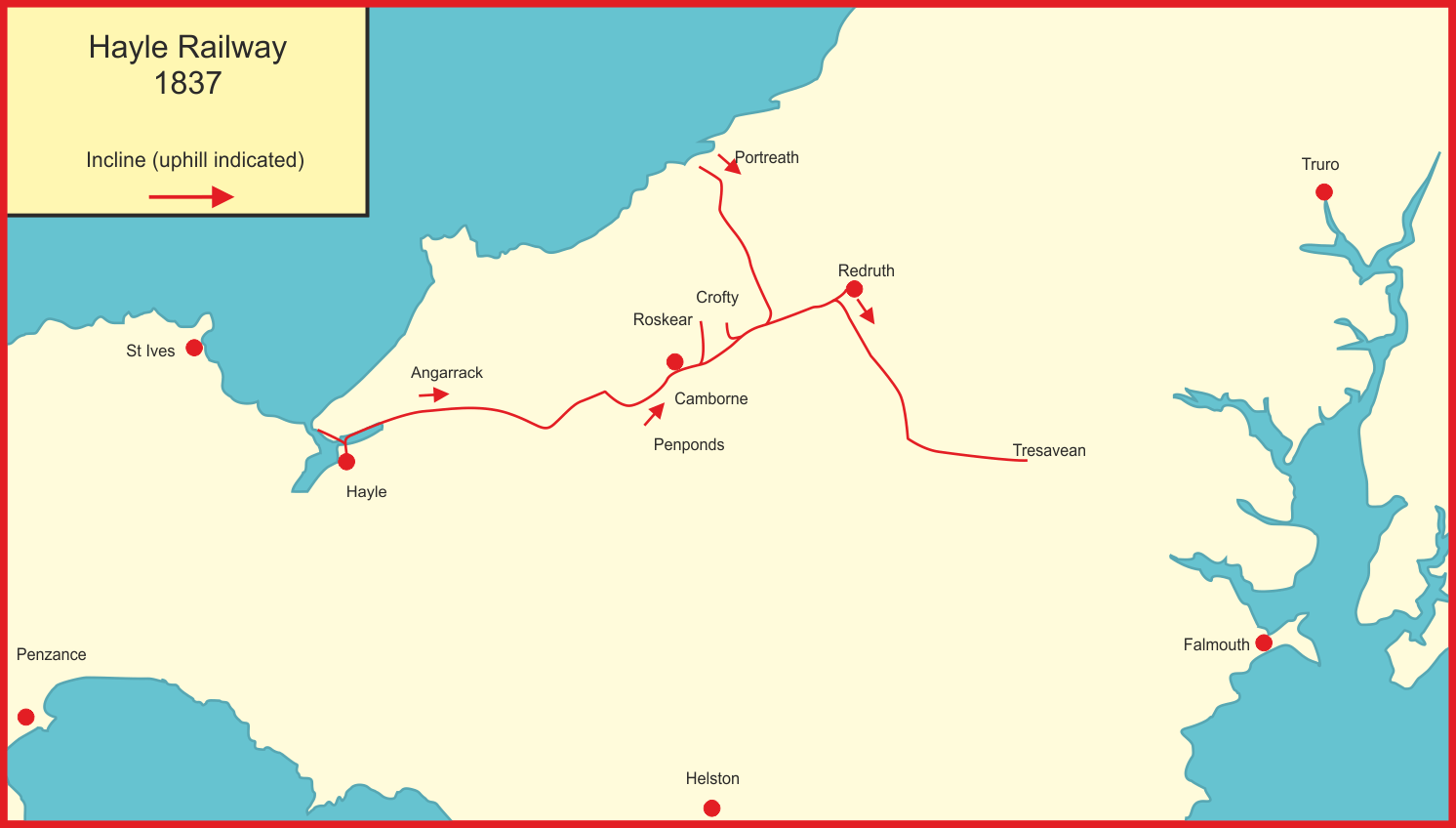
Hayle Railway System in 1837

The Hayle Railway was an early railway in West Cornwall, constructed to convey copper and tin ore from the Redruth and Camborne areas to sea ports at Hayle and Portreath. It was opened in 1837, and carried passengers on its main line from 1843.

Part of the main line was incorporated into the route of the West Cornwall Railway in 1852, and is part of the main line railway to the present day; information about the modern operation of the railway route in Cornwall can be found at Cornish Main Line.

== General description ==
The Hayle Railway was opened on 29 December 1837 between Hayle and Portreath, with the remainder opening during 1838. When fully opened, its eastern terminals were at Redruth and copper and tin mines at Tresavean and Lanner, and it ran to wharves and a foundry at Hayle. A long branch was also opened from Pool (later called Carn Brea) to Portreath.

Steam traction was used on part of the route from the outset, but horse traction was used at first at the western end. There were four inclines (described below) which were rope-worked.

The railway enabled the transportation of copper and tin ore from the mines, using coastal shipping or onward transport. Coal (for fuelling pumps which kept the mines dry) and machinery and timber were brought in, and general merchandise was conveyed.

The line was built to standard gauge, the first such in Cornwall, and it had no connection with any other railway. The permanent way was T-section rails laid on stone block sleepers. It was single-line throughout, except for double track on the inclines.

The line from Redruth to Hayle was 9 miles 44 chains (15.37 km) in length; Tresavean to Redruth Junction was 2 miles 55 chains (4.33 km); the Portreath branch was 3 miles 6 chains (4.95 km); the Hayle branch (on the quays at Hayle) was 25 chains (0.50 km) long, and there were short branches to Roskear (77 chains, 1.55 km) and North Crofty (48 chains, 0.97 km). (There are 80 chains in a mile; one chain is 22 yards, or about 20 metres.)

== Formation and opening ==
Hayle Railway Act 1834
- Act of Parliament
- Parliament of the United Kingdom
- Long title: An Act for making and maintaining a Railway from Hayle in the Parish of Saint Erth in the County of Cornwall to Tresavean Mine in the Parish of Gwennap in the said County, with several Branches therefrom.
- Citation: 4 & 5 Will. 4. c. lxviii

Dates
- Royal assent: 27 June 1834

Text of statute as originally enacted

Hayle Railway Act 1836
- Act of Parliament
- Parliament of the United Kingdom
- Long title: An Act to enable the Hayle Railway Company to make certain Alterations in the Lines of such Railway, and for other Purposes relating thereto.
- Citation: 6 & 7 Will. 4. c. cx

Dates
- Royal assent: 4 July 1836

Text of statute as originally enacted

In the early years of the 19th century, mineral extraction and smelting was a dynamic industry in West Cornwall, and the port of Hayle was well established. However the transport of heavy materials over imperfect unmade roads was a severe limitation. When the Redruth and Chasewater Railway was opened in 1826 (as a horse-drawn railway), it was immediately successful operationally and financially. This encouraged owners of mines and works not served by that line to promote a railway from Tresavean to Hayle, serving numerous other mines in between. Accordingly, the Hayle Railway Company was incorporated by act of Parliament, the Hayle Railway Act 1834 (4 & 5 Will. 4. c. lxviii), on 27 June 1834; the company was to have headquarters in London, and a share capital of £64,000, with authority to borrow £16,000 in debenture. A branch to Helston was included, but this was dropped in a second act of Parliament, the Hayle Railway Act 1836 (6 & 7 Will. 4. c. cx), of 4 July 1836.

Construction proceeded well, except for the provision of a drawbridge at the western end of the line. (Presumably this was the bridge at the sluice at the mouth of Copperhouse Pool.) In 1837 the company proposed to open all of its line east of the bridge, which would have connected all the mines to the harbour, but would have left the foundry owned by Henry Harvey, located immediately to the west, disconnected. Harvey was concerned that this temporary arrangement would disadvantage him competitively, and he drew attention to a clause in the authorising Act requiring that "the line should be completed before opening". His objection motivated the directors of the company, and the drawbridge was speedily completed.

The line was therefore opened from Hayle foundry to Pool and Portreath on 23 December 1837. The continuation to Redruth was formally opened on 31 May 1838, and fully opened to the public on 11 June 1838. The Tresavean line opened on 23 June 1838.

The network therefore consisted of:

- Hayle to Redruth Junction: 9 mi 30 ch
- Redruth Junction to Redruth: 14 ch
- Redruth Junction to Tresavean: 2 mi 55 ch
- Portreath branch: 3 mi 6 ch
- Roskear branch: 77 ch
- Crofty branch 48 ch
- Hayle branch (presumably the North Quay sidings): 25 ch

== Route description ==
=== Main line ===
The station at Redruth was in the angle of Blowinghouse Hill and Coach Lane; it had been open from the beginning as a goods terminal, and passenger services started on 23 May 1843; there was a single platform beneath a wooden train shed.

At the south-west corner of the station site, the Tresavean branch trailed in, and the line headed west, following the route now used by the main line. It passed Portreath Junction, where the line from the harbour there trailed in. A little further was Pool station (later called Carn Brea). Immediately to the east of the station were workshops and engine sheds, and connections to mines. Further west the Crofty branch (to mines) diverged, and then the Roskear branch, also serving mines and workshops, trailed in at Roskear Junction.

Next was Camborne station, beyond which the line ran a little to the south of the present main line, to the head of the Penponds incline, just to the west of Pendarves Road. The engine house that must have been here has been obliterated by housing development.

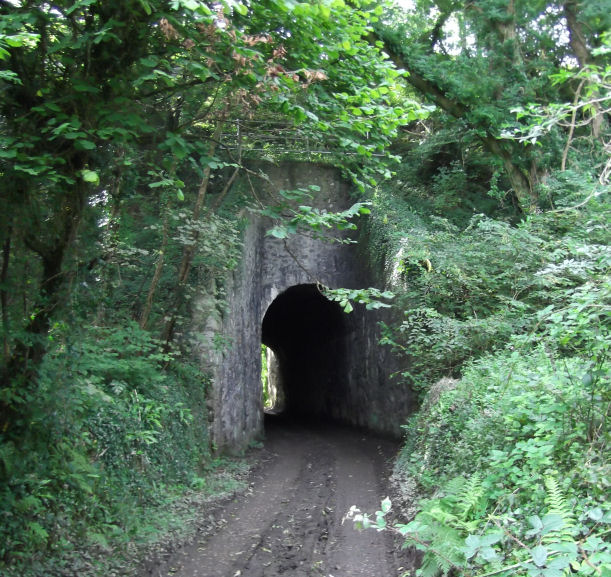
The "tunnel" carrying the Hayle Railway over Old Mill Lane (2012)

The bottom end of the incline was to the west of Mill Road; having reached the lower level, the line curved round sharply to the north, following the contour, turning west again. It crossed the small valley formed by an arm of the Red River immediately to the north of the present viaduct, and the then by a separate bridge over the adjacent Old Mill Lane (in fact a footpath and farm track). The later replacement viaduct is at a much higher level and crosses both the river and lane in a single structure, but the original lane bridge is still present; it is shown as "tunnel" on some modern large scale maps.

The old line continued broadly westward, at first a little to the north of the modern route, with a southward loop to follow the contour through the site of the later Gwinear Road station, and then to near Trenowin Farm, where the line continued almost due west; the present line diverges to the south. Crossing Steamers Hill, the line came to the head of Angarrack incline and descended to Phillack, running on the north side of Copperhouse Pool. The three arch bridge over a stream at Lethlean (near Phillack, just south of the middle of Glebe Row) is the oldest surviving railway bridge in Cornwall. This bridge was the subject of a restoration project conducted by Hayle Scouts in 1982.

Continuing to the western end of the Pool, there was probably a "station" called Hayle Riviere close to the present North Quay. At this point the line swung south, crossing the channel by a swing bridge—the present swing bridge is not on the same alignment.

From the swing bridge the line swung sharply west and then followed the southerly alignment of Penpol Terrace, crossing under the present-day Hayle Viaduct, and then turning north, once more under the later Hayle Viaduct, to sidings on East Quay; there were also siding connections to Harvey's machine factory. North Quay was also served by sidings, with a junction, facing for trains from Redruth, east of the swing bridge.

When passenger services were first in operation, in May 1843, trains apparently started and terminated at Crotch's Hotel, close to Foundry Square. A proper station building came into use in Foundry Square from 27 May 1844. The Hayle station buildings were on the outside of the railway's loop south of the present Hayle viaduct, between the Hayle Railway line and the present B3301 road. There were two buildings; the eastern building is marked Literary Institution on the 1879 Ordnance Survey map, having changed to that use. The buildings are numbers 333 and 334 on the inventory and map 16d in Hayle Historical Assessment Cornwall, (but a different numbering system was used in the summary document). A photograph of 1938 indicates that it was then in use by the Hayle Women's Unionist Association; it was demolished in December 1948.

=== Portreath branch ===
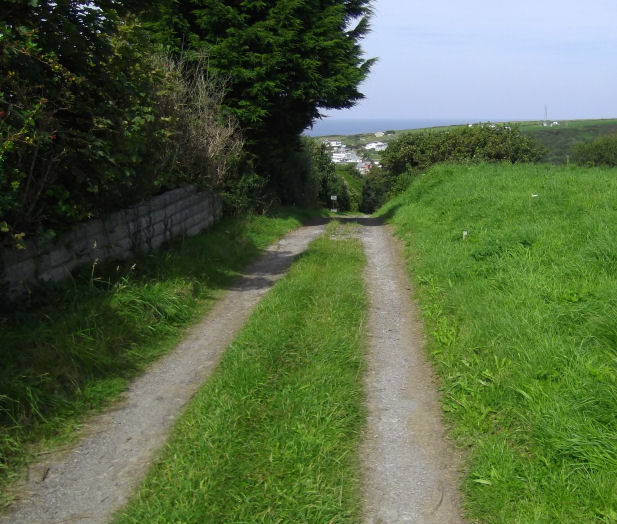
A 2012 view down the course of the Portreath incline from the summit

The Portreath branch left the main line at Pool (later Carn Brea; facing for trains from Hayle) and ran broadly north-northwest to the head of the Portreath incline, where the line turned north to descend to the harbour there. The general alignment is detectable in aerial photographs, and the incline head is accessible; there is an underbridge at the foot of the incline, which is clearly visible.

=== Tresavean branch ===
The line started from Wheal Comfort mine at Tresavean, and followed a zigzag course to stay on the contour, passing west of Lanner and crossing the Redruth and Chasewater Railway there. (There was no connection as the other railway was of a different gauge, although both lines had a siding near the crossing.) Passing near Wheal Uny, the line ran to the head of its incline immediately west of Trewirgle Road; the line fell to the level of the Redruth terminus, and turned west at the foot to join it. Most of the alignment is plain in aerial photographs; the point of intersection with the Redruth & Chasewater line, and the incline near the head, are accessible.

Barton states that the Tresavean line "was horse worked, locomotives normally running only to the top of the incline up from the main Camborne - Redruth main line".

== Inclines ==
There was a large fall in elevation from the mines to the ports, and to optimise the haulage capacity available at the time, the line was laid out with generally moderate gradients, but with four inclines (sometimes referred to as inclined planes). The inclines carried the railway down a steep hillside, and the "trains" (or groups of wagons) were controlled by a rope, hauled or let out from an engine house or other control location at the head of the incline. Generally locomotives were used to haul the trains to and from the ends of the inclines, and did not themselves travel with the train. However horse traction was used west of the Angarrack incline at first, but from 1843 locomotives worked over the incline, using the rope for traction and braking, and from there to Hayle.

A more general description of the use of inclined planes in railway situations is at Cable railway.

The four inclined planes were at:

- Redruth on the Tresavean line, just south of the junction with the Redruth terminus line, and often referred to as Tresavean incline;
- Portreath, immediately south of the harbour
- Penponds, west of Camborne; and
- Angarrack

The Redruth incline was 2,640 feet (800 m) long, with a rise of 170 feet (52 m); it was gravity worked, and was in operation from 1837 to 1935.

The Portreath incline was 1,716 feet (523 m) long with a rise of about 240 feet (73 m). It was worked by a stationary steam engine.

Penponds incline was about 1,900 feet (580 m) long, and was worked on the counterbalanced principle.

Angarrack incline was 1,900 feet (580 m) long with a fall of about 185 feet (56 m); it was powered by a stationary steam engine.

The railway received an estimate to provide four stationary steam engines in 1836, in the amount of £7,100, although in the event the Penponds and Tresavean inclines were gravity operated.

== Operations ==
Little is known of the operation of the line, except the mechanics of the inclines.

There were no fixed signals, and trains were despatched under the time interval system. [In the absence of telegraph communication, collisions were intended to be avoided by holding trains back until a specified time interval had elapsed since the departure of the previous train.]

== Rolling stock ==
Five locomotives were usually in service, supplied by a contractor, Mr Chanter. When the company was taken over by the West Cornwall in 1846 the inventory was:

Name	Value at takeover
Pendarves	£250
Cornubia	£350
Carn Brea	£500
Coryndon	
Chanter	£1,340

At the time of takeover, there were 119 trucks and 6 passenger coaches.

== Passenger business ==
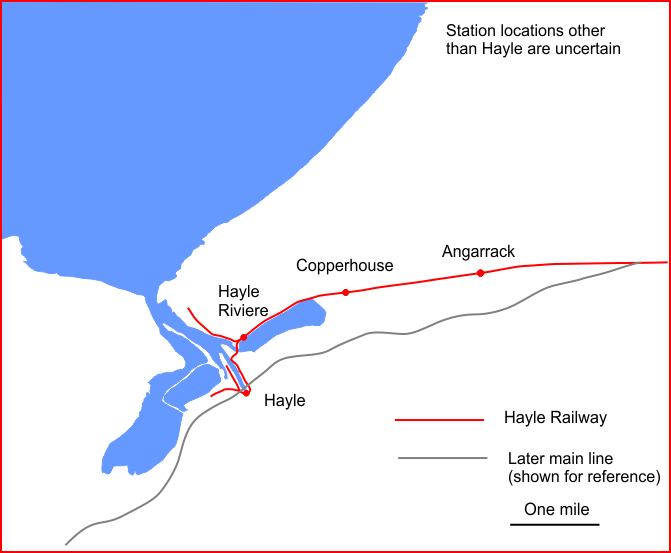
Hayle Railway network in 1843

The railway was built as a mineral line, and the terminals were simply siding groups at the mines, with an extensive siding layout at Hayle serving wharves there, and Harvey's foundry and engineering works, and wharf sidings at Portreath. At other locations siding connections were made to the railway to serve mines and factories.

There was considerable demand for the conveyance of passengers. A steam packet service had been introduced in 1831 between Hayle and Bristol, and from 1841 it was possible to continue to London by the Great Western Railway. The Hayle company's Act authorised the conveyance of passengers, although this was not considered important at first, but in 1843 a passenger service was initiated between Hayle and Redruth, starting on 22 May 1843. There may have been unofficial usage of the mineral trains by passengers before that date.

The stations (except at the termini, these were probably little more than locations where the trains stopped) were at:

- Redruth (on the Camborne road, west of the town)
- Pool
- Camborne
- Penponds
- Gwinear
- Angarrack
- Copperhouse
- Hayle Riviere, and
- Hayle (in Foundry Square).

Note: Only Oakley refers to Hayle Riviere

At first the stopping place at Hayle was at Crotch's Hotel, near Foundry Square. Oakley states that Crotch "operated the railway in the early days"; this may mean that he provided the passenger vehicles, as Anthony reports that "two railway carriages, or 'Omnibusses' as they were called, were provided by 'an individual at Hayle and fitted up at his own expense' -- evidently Mr Crotch".

The passenger operations were a great success, and this encouraged the directors to run excursion trains on Whit Monday 1843, "to enable passengers to go and return at any time of the day, visiting the beautiful bay of St Ives, the sandy beaches of Gwithian and Hayle, and Gwennap Pit, the noted scene of Wesley's labours". (John Wesley had preached at the location over a number of years in the previous century.)

By July 1844 there were three passenger services each way daily, taking an hour for the journey.

Bradshaw's Guide for 1850 shows the three return journeys mentioned above, leaving Redruth for Hayle at 9.00, 12.00 and 4.15 pm, and taking 50, 60 and 45 minutes respectively; the return journeys were at 10.00, 1.10 pm and 5.00 pm, taking 50, 50 and 60 minutes respectively. The distance is quoted as 12 miles, and the fare was 1s first class, 9d second class and 6d third class. "Omnibuses attend at Hayle and Redruth ... to convey passengers to Penzance or Truro, and for Falmouth."

== Accidents ==
The trains were mixed mineral and passenger, and the practice approaching Hayle was to uncouple the passenger portion while the train was in motion, allowing the passenger coaches to coast to the passenger station. This led to an accident on 1 September 1843, reported in The West Briton newspaper a week later:

"On Friday afternoon last, as the second afternoon down train from Redruth, laden with ore and passengers, reached the branch line which leads to the north quays of Messrs. SANDYS, CARNE, and VIVIAN, Hayle, a tremendous crash took place. The rail at that part of the line being under alteration, the sleepers were bared, and the rail temporarily laid on them. Before the train arrived at the branch line, the passenger carriages were, as usual, cast off for the terminus, and following the train by the given impetus. The engine proceeded on with the rest of the train to the diverging line, and when it reached the place under alteration, the rail slipped off the sleepers, and the foremost carriage was thrown off, turned upside down, and dashed to atoms. The second carriage was piled on the first and destroyed, and the third on the second. The fourth was brought up by the third, and the rest of the train by the large granite sleepers, the whole having been forced off the rail. By that time the passenger carriages ran on and were brought up against the engine. We rejoice to state that only a few persons were slightly bruised and frightened. When the train reached that place, some one of the train generally runs forward on the carriages to the foremost carriage. Fortunately, in this instance, he had only got so far as the last but one; when he was hurled on the cliff uninjured. Had he been in the foremost carriage, he would have been crushed to death. If some one had dragged the passenger carriages, that collision might have been prevented. Each carriage contained three and a half tons of ore, and although no ore was lost (being in sacks), the damage is estimated at L100."

Anthony records that an accident took place on Whit Monday 1844. A train was conveying passengers from Hayle to Redruth for a religious service at Gwennap Pit. "It was about eleven o'clock in the morning when the engine and the first three coaches of the train were successfully hauled to the top of the Angarrack incline. When the second part of the train was about half way up, the wire rope broke, and to the horror of the unfortunate passengers, the trucks began to run back, slowly at first, and then increasing to an alarming speed. A number of passengers jumped out and were injured, but those who stayed on board, ended up, shaken but safe, back at Hayle."

A similar accident took place in 1846, when a coupling broke on a heavily loaded passenger train. A six wagon passenger train was ascending the incline, although normal practice was to limit these "trains" to four. The incline was operated on the counterbalance principle, and when the counterbalance reached the lower end of its travel, not all of the long train was safely above the summit. A secondary stationary steam engine was put in gear to assist the completion of the ascent, and in doing so there was a sudden jerk, causing the couplings behind the second wagon to break. Four carriages with 130 people on board ran away down the incline; several persons jumped off and two were seriously injured, but the runaway vehicles came to a stand at Hayle bridge, about two miles away.

== Purchase by the West Cornwall Railway ==
Cornish interests promoted a railway that became the West Cornwall Railway, with the object of providing a through railway between Penzance and Truro, connecting there with the Cornwall Railway, and giving rail connection to Devon and the Great Western Railway.

The West Cornwall Railway got an Act of Parliament on 3 August 1846, and the powers included the purchase of the Hayle Railway and adoption of most of its alignment. The actual purchase took effect on 3 November 1846.

The West Cornwall Company decided to improve the Hayle Railway main line, altering its alignment from Hayle to the south of Copperhouse Pool, converging with the old main line at Trenawin, so avoiding the Angarrack inclined plane. At Penponds, the inclined plane was avoided by the construction of a new timber viaduct 693 feet long at a higher level over the valley there, enabling easing of the gradient. The stations at Hayle and Redruth were relocated on the respective new sections of West Cornwall route.

The new owner closed the Hayle Railway network on 16 February 1852 to enable conversion work to take place, and it reopened on 11 March 1852 as part of a new Penzance to Redruth line, using the Hayle Railway terminus at Redruth. The old Angarrack alignment was abandoned east of Phillack, and the old Penponds alignment was abandoned. The Tresavean and Portreath branches continued in operation under the new owner.

The West Cornwall Railway opened its main line east of Redruth (with a new station there) ceremonially on 25 August 1852, and the old Hayle Railway station at Redruth was reduced to a goods station.

== See also ==
- History of rail transport in Great Britain
