= Cornish Main Line =

Railway line in Cornwall, England

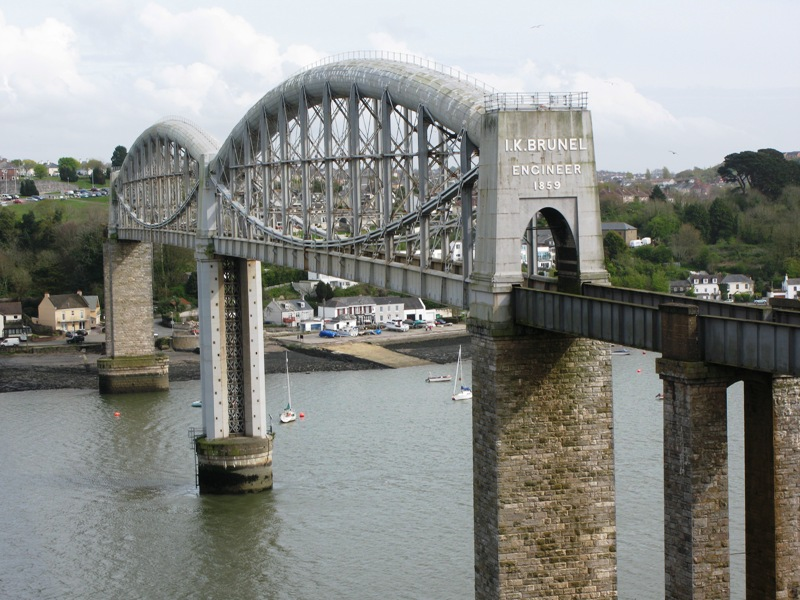
- The Royal Albert Bridge crossing the River Tamar

Overview
- Native name: Penn-hyns-horn Kernow
- Status: Operational
- Owner: Network Rail
- Locale: Cornwall, England
- Termini: Plymouth, Penzance

Service
- Type: Heavy rail
- System: National Rail
- Operator(s): Passenger: Great Western Railway, CrossCountry; Freight: GB Railfreight

History
- Opened: 1867

Technical
- Line length: 79.5 miles (128 km)
- Num of tracks: Double with three single track sections
- Track gauge: 4 ft 8 1/2 in (1,435 mm) standard gauge
- Old gauge: 7 ft 1/4 in (2,140 mm) Brunel gauge
- Operating speed: 75 mph (121 km/h) maximum
Route map
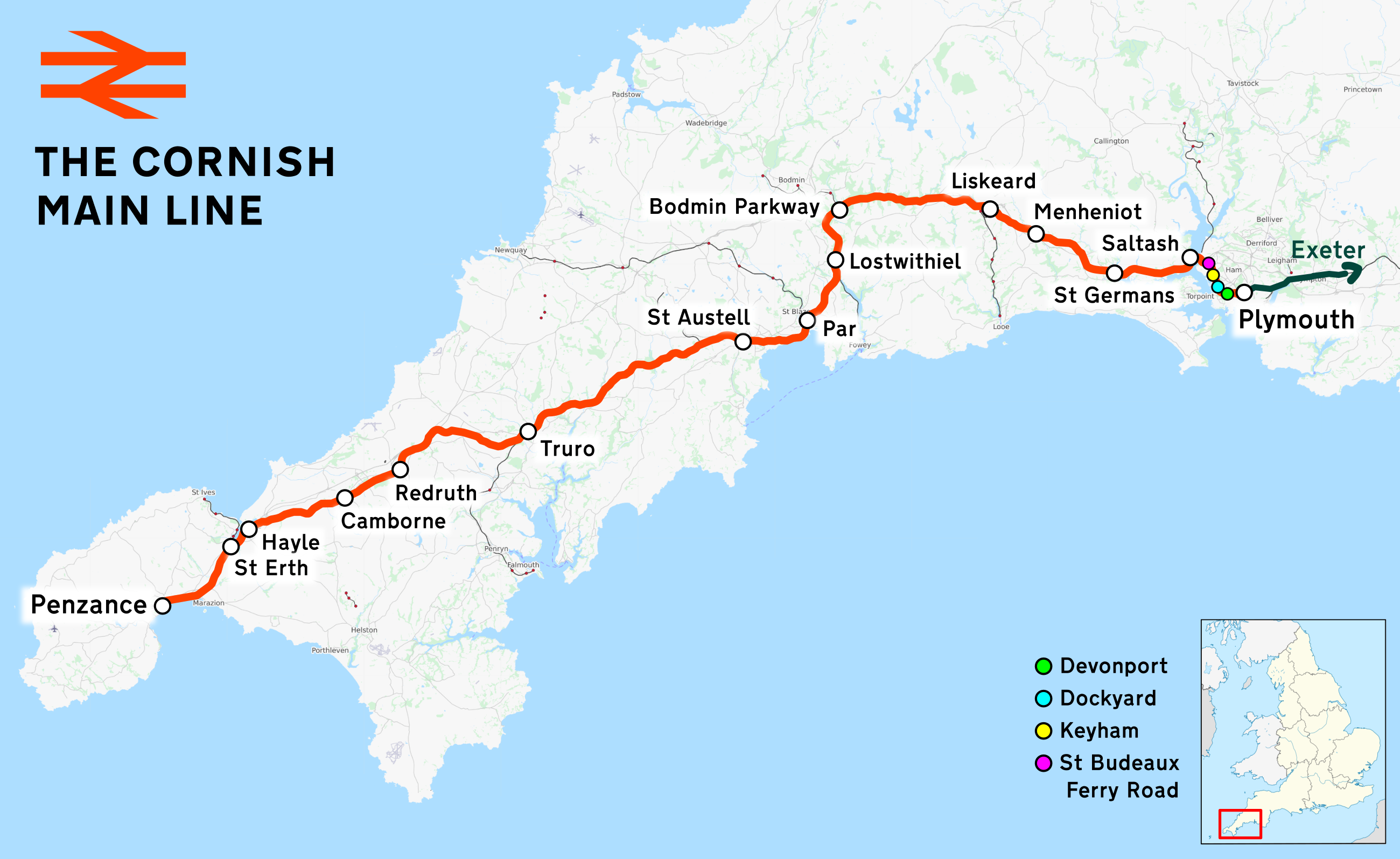
(Click to expand)

The Cornish Main Line (Cornish: Penn-hyns-horn Kernow) is a railway line in Cornwall and the south-west corner of Devon, in England. It runs from Penzance to Plymouth, crossing the county boundary on the Royal Albert Bridge over the river Tamar at Saltash. It is the southernmost railway line in the United Kingdom and the westernmost in England.

The line forms the backbone for railway services in Cornwall. It serves Truro, St Austell, Bodmin (by a Parkway station) and Liskeard; branches from it serve St Ives, Falmouth, Newquay and Looe. Directly connected to the South Devon Main Line at Plymouth, it also carries direct trains to/from London, Birmingham, Cardiff, Newcastle-upon-Tyne and Edinburgh.

== History ==
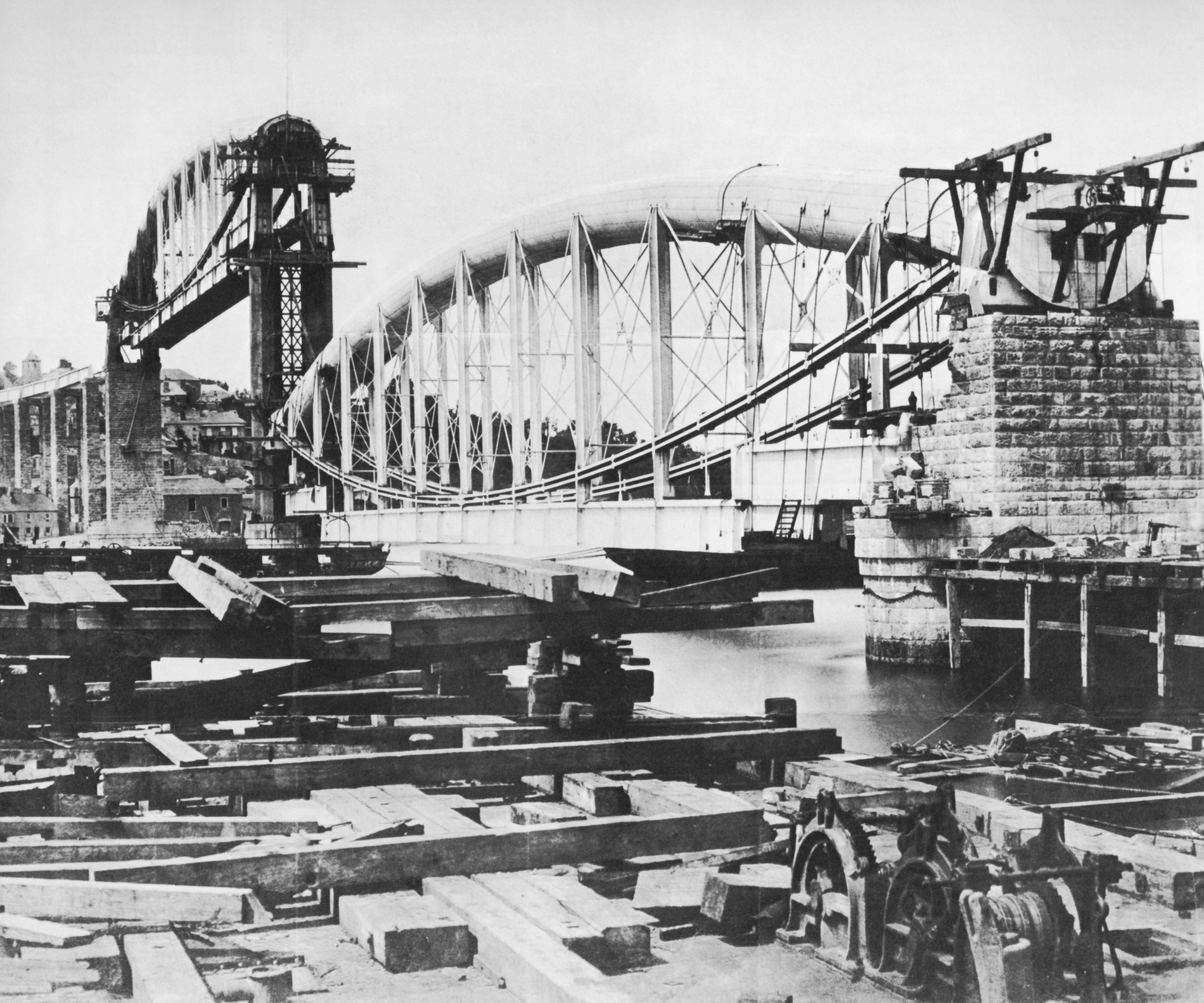
The Royal Albert Bridge under construction in 1858

The Cornish Main Line was originally built by two separate railway companies: the West Cornwall Railway between Truro and Penzance, opened in 1852, and the Cornwall Railway between Plymouth and a separate station in Truro, opened in 1859. The West Cornwall Railway was itself based on the Hayle Railway, opened in 1837 as a purely local mineral railway.

Rail travel from Penzance to London was possible from 1860, when the West Cornwall company was given access to the Cornwall Railway’s Truro station. However, the West Cornwall trains were standard gauge and the Cornwall Railway was broad gauge, so through passengers had to change trains there and goods had to be transhipped into wagons of the other gauge at Truro.

The impecunious West Cornwall company sold its railway to the more powerful broad gauge Associated Companies, dominated by the Great Western Railway, and the new owners converted the West Cornwall line to broad gauge. Through goods trains started running in 1866 and passenger trains in 1867.

The Associated Companies merged into the Great Western Railway and, in 1892, the Great Western converted all its broad gauge track to standard gauge, a process called the gauge conversion.

Both the West Cornwall and the Cornwall railways had numerous timber trestle viaducts; these were cheap to build but very expensive to maintain, as the timber decayed. The iconic Cornwall Railway viaducts were eventually all reconstructed in masonry, masonry and wrought iron, or sometimes by-passed.

The most iconic structure on the route, however, is the Royal Albert Bridge spanning the river Tamar, which was opened in 1859; it remains in use to the present day.

During the later decades of the 19th century and the first half of the 20th, the Great Western Railway was famous for providing transport to holiday destinations in Cornwall and there were numerous branch lines served from the Cornish Main Line giving access to the resorts. The physical limitations of the steeply graded line imposed severe problems during the busiest times, not least for goods train operation. Equally famous was the line’s use for transporting vegetable produce from Cornwall, including broccoli and cauliflower, and cut flowers from the Isles of Scilly.

To cope with the increasing traffic, the line was gradually doubled between 1893 and 1930.

Many branch lines were closed during the second half of the twentieth century but, in Cornwall, the Looe, Newquay, Falmouth Docks and St Ives branches remained open to passengers; service frequencies on all have been increased in recent times. A fifth branch starts at Plymouth and crosses the Tamar en route to serve Calstock and Gunnislake. During the summer, the Newquay branch is also served by inter-city trains to London, the North of England and Scotland. A further branch from Lostwithiel still carries local china clay trains to Fowey docks, while there are more china clay lines from Burngullow, west of St Austell, and as spurs from the Newquay and Looe branches.

=== Recent history ===
The 7.5-mile (12.1 km) section from Burngullow to Probus (between the current stations at St Austell and Truro) had been a double tracked, but was singled in 1985 due to subsidence from closed mines. It became a major cause of delays in the region, requiring trains to wait for preceding trains to clear the singled section before proceeding. The section was redoubled in August 2004 at a cost of £14.3 million that was funded by Objective One, Strategic Rail Authority and Cornwall County Council.

In late 2010s, there was a programme of improvements along the line, including 21 new signals and upgrades to level crossings. These improvements allowed train frequency to be increased from hourly to half-hourly from May 2019, coinciding with the introduction of the new Class 802s on the line.

== Route ==
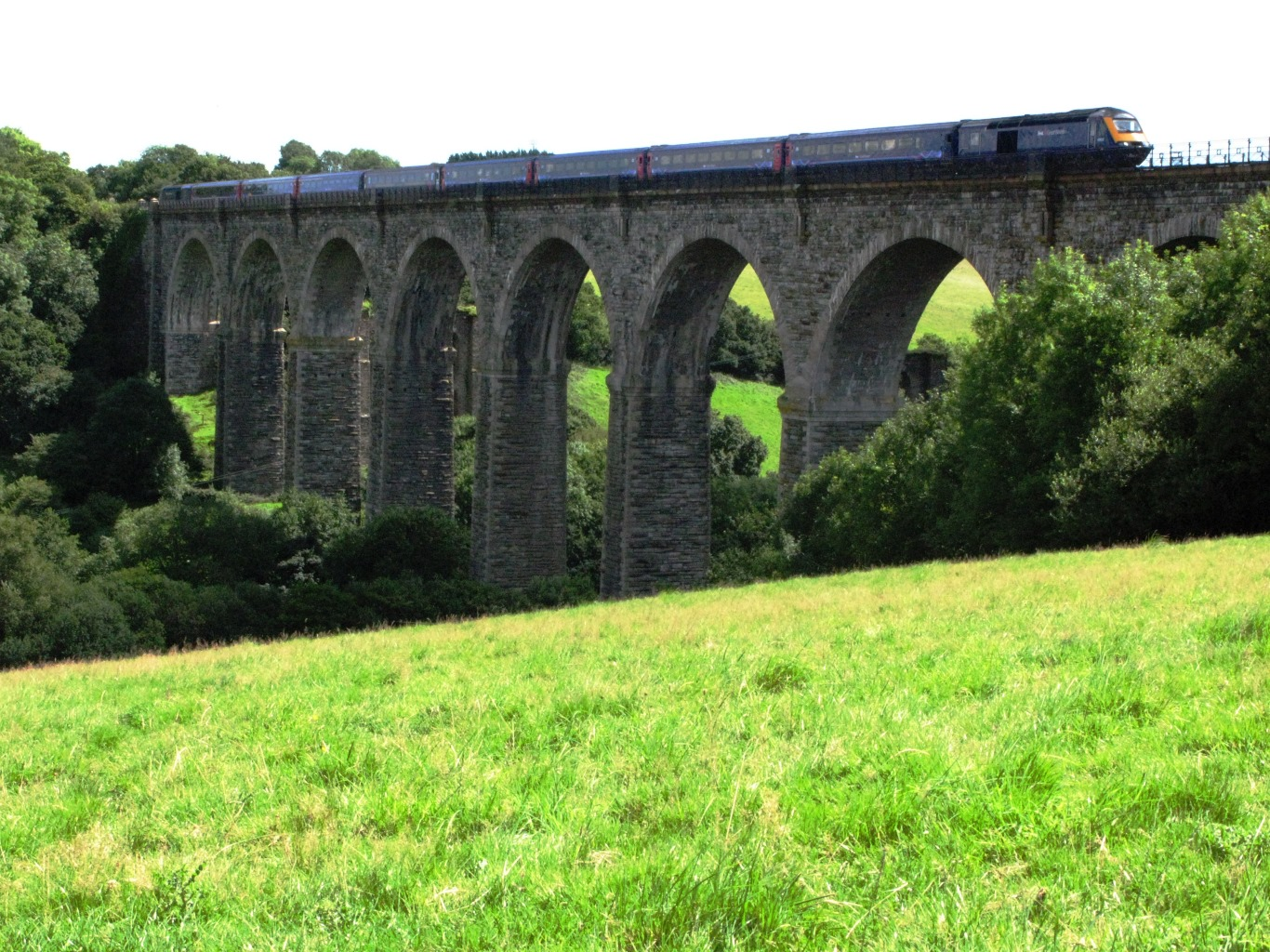
An InterCity 125 train travelling toward Penzance over the Moorswater Viaduct

The communities served are: Plymouth (including the suburbs of Devonport and St. Budeaux), Saltash, St Germans, Menheniot, Liskeard, Bodmin, Lostwithiel, Par, St Austell, Truro, Redruth, Camborne, Hayle, St Erth and Penzance.

In addition, there are five branch lines with passenger services:

- Atlantic Coast Line - links Par with Newquay
- Looe Valley Line - links Liskeard with Looe
- Maritime Line - links Truro with Penryn and Falmouth
- St Ives Bay Line - links St. Erth with St. Ives
- Tamar Valley Line - links Plymouth with Bere Alston, Calstock and Gunnislake.

The stations at St Austell and Penzance lie adjacent to bus stations. In addition, integrated bus services operate from Bodmin Parkway to Bodmin, Wadebridge and Padstow; from St Austell to the Eden Project; and from Redruth to Helston and RNAS Culdrose.

The route has a large number of viaducts, but the most significant structure is the Royal Albert Bridge which crosses the river Tamar at Saltash.

At Truro, the viaducts give sweeping views of the city and River Fal; further west, the north coast can be seen near Hayle before the line swings onto the south coast for the last mile or so along the beach at Marazion, giving a good view of St Michael's Mount.

The nominal line speed is 65 mph (105 km/h), but there are local restrictions at many places. The route is nearly all double tracked and cleared for trains up to W7 and W6A gauges.

There are three remaining sections of single line track, all of them 1.2 mi (2 km) or less. One of these sections is between St. Budeaux Ferry Road and Saltash over the Royal Albert Bridge, another is on two viaducts near Liskeard, and the final section is on the approach to Penzance, alongside Long Rock depot.

== Usage ==
The number of passengers travelling on the Cornish Main Line has increased in the last few years. Between 2004/05 and 2011/12, with the exception of Keyham and Menheniot, all stations have reported an increase of at least 33%; Hayle, Par, Saltash and St Budeaux Ferry Road were all reported to have been calculated to be in excess of 200%. The busiest stations are Plymouth, Penzance and Truro, which all handle more than one million passengers arriving or departing each year. St Austell, Redruth and Liskeard all had more than 300,000 passengers in 2011-12, increases of around 50% or 60% over 2004/05.

Station usage
Station name	2002–03	2004–05	2005–06	2006–07	2007–08	2008–09	2009–10	2010–11	2011–12	2012–13	2013–14	2014–15	2015–16	2016–17	2017–18	2018–19	2019–20	2020–21	2021–22	2022–23	2023–24	2024–25
Plymouth	1,431,674	1,519,011	1,629,011	1,845,958	2,026,851	2,249,849	2,278,718	2,401,082	2,599,428	2,579,316	2,445,464	2,495,248	2,487,562	2,509,452	2,449,000	2,416,000	2,372,000	699,268	1,992,020	2,313,092		
Devonport	18,795	16,202	18,573	19,655	17,450	21,528	21,674	27,006	27,752	29,878	31,866	33,968	39,742	41,404	45,492	39,464	43,046	16,150	30,866	34,970		
Dockyard	4,070	5,088	4,895	5,335	4,924	5,274	5,524	5,406	7,716	7,400	6,970	6,300	4,160	4,728	4,432	4,406	10,368	4,050	7,154	8,960		
Keyham	8,957	6,374	7,594	7,976	5,055	5,600	5,016	6,330	7,700	6,540	7,100	6,936	7,338	9,122	7,198	7,156	7,808	3,374	8,786	13,530		
St Budeaux Ferry Road	987	969	1,015	1,037	1,199	1,132	1,540	2,326	3,552	3,822	4,754	3,926	2,980	3,976	2,980	3,976	2,348	1,068	2,444	2,508		
Saltash	27,197	35,349	32,186	34,266	32,062	47,244	49,578	59,240	75,956	77,288	73,764	68,526	67,174	78,198	82,398	83,574	85,396	41,154	117,598	137,000		
St Germans	25,681	24,926	28,228	29,540	29,073	37,718	38,258	44,758	51,022	52,958	54,738	57,102	58,676	60,320	57,066	56,698	58,254	17,770	54,130	64,782		
Menheniot	6,554	5,782	4,453	4,206	3,610	4,598	3,844	2,690	2,404	2,324	4,064	4,128	5,096	5,858	4,140	3,696	2,482	1,266	1,924	3,634		
Liskeard	209,875	232,269	237,113	267,864	274,090	294,638	289,276	309,162	344,574	335,812	344,144	357,086	351,394	358,324	355,000	351,000	359,000	109,704	294,590	310,158		
Bodmin Parkway	144,146	158,172	166,743	185,498	203,061	225,140	221,616	235,876	248,566	238,616	225,296	237,776	234,792	236,190	241,000	234,000	243,000	75,998	230,370	261,416		
Lostwithiel	40,701	42,602	46,172	46,645	51,695	61,716	68,336	73,584	77,022	76,922	73,042	68,240	67,472	72,530	70,348	66,624	67,706	24,142	61,534	72,356		
Par	78,175	95,475	111,912	119,859	139,688	160,832	162,872	179,100	186,038	193,818	190,532	197,670	190,168	195,732	191,000	195,000	200,000	68,660	182,676	194,980		
St Austell	266,676	275,056	281,545	314,613	360,484	388,878	395,222	436,440	466,926	469,074	461,194	467,806	464,000	472,538	461,000	460,000	459,000	149,608	385,110	431,288		
Truro	638,727	714,954	772,674	856,474	917,184	997,368	1,042,412	1,161,138	1,279,346	1,265,284	1,238,874	1,257,04	1,201,010	1,202,942	1,205,000	1,187,000	1,211,000	419,996	1,048,568	1,100,592		
Redruth	186,977	219,013	228,511	258,384	277,853	292,940	284,462	308,444	335,154	338,140	334,946	343,722	334,194	340,356	338,000	328,000	342,000	123,520	304,310	328,990		
Camborne	109,628	146,595	157,026	181,671	193,948	215,600	224,950	247,360	275,440	279,898	283,400	280,452	269,034	262,070	255,000	266,000	278,000	118,444	280,418	295,808		
Hayle	34,802	43,467	51,299	63,593	60,174	73,868	77,172	85,508	89,746	88,704	90,810	87,948	81,732	79,198	82,714	83,446	92,084	47,656	118,512	126,974		
St Erth	71,406	90,541	88,341	67,004	68,230	75,026	75,248	120,770	202,280	206,166	199,852	204,806	257,802	251,858	262,000	271,000	291,000	136,176	385,710	364,854		
Penzance	392,008	403,000	413,905	461,764	498,290	526,132	520,982	556,546	580,238	562,992	533,258	549,730	543,036	560,338	568,836	570,098	574,000	190,426	515,600	564,724		
The annual passenger usage is based on sales of tickets in stated financial years from Office of Rail and Road estimates of station usage. The statistics are for passengers arriving and departing from each station and cover twelve-month periods that start in April. Methodology may vary year on year. Usage since the period 2019–20 have been affected by the COVID-19 pandemic, especially the period 2020–23.

Freight traffic is mostly confined to china clay. This is worked by GB Railfreight who took over the contract from DB Cargo on 1 April 2026.

== Accidents ==
The Cornwall Main Line has been a very safe railway for passengers, with only a few accidents occurring in the 19th century; these include:

- Grove Viaduct, St Germans – derailment, 6 May 1859
- St Austell – runaway train, 29 October 1872
- Menheniot – collision, 2 December 1873
- Bodmin Road – derailment, 13 April 1895.

== See also ==
- Cornwall Railway
- Cornwall Railway viaducts
- Disused railway stations on the Cornish Main Line
- Great Western Main Line
- West Cornwall Railway
