= Devonport railway station =

Railway station in Devon, England

Devonport

General information
- Location: Devonport, Plymouth; England
- Coordinates: 50.3785°N 4.1702°W
- Grid reference: SX457554
- Manager: Great Western Railway
- Platforms: 2

Other information
- Station code: DPT
- Classification: DfT category F2

History
- Original company: Cornwall Railway
- Pre-grouping: Great Western Railway
- Post-grouping: Great Western Railway

Key dates
- 1859: Opened
- 1948: Albert Road added to name
- 1968: Name reverted to Devonport

Passengers
- 2021/22: ▲30,866
- 2022/23: ▲34,970
- 2023/24: ▲47,214
- 2024/25: ▲49,756
- 2025/26: ▲58,932
Location
Notes
- Passenger statistics from the Office of Rail and Road

Devonport railway station serves the Devonport area of Plymouth in Devon, England. It is 248 miles 28 chains (399.7 km) from London Paddington measured via Box and Plymouth Millbay. It is managed by Great Western Railway.

== History ==
The station opened with the Cornwall Railway on 4 May 1859. It was described at the time as "built of rubble masonry, in the Italian style of architecture, which style is adopted at all stations on the railway. It consists of an arrival, departure, and goods stations, the two former being stone structures, and the last a wooden erection".

In 1865 the Royal Agricultural Show was held at nearby at Pennycomequick and so the opportunity was taken to enlarge the platforms at Devonport. A "refreshment booth" was also erected for the duration of the show to cater for the large number of visitors expected.

The Cornwall Railway was amalgamated into the Great Western Railway on 1 July 1889. The Great Western Railway was nationalised into British Railways from 1 January 1948 which was in turn privatised in the 1990s.

For a while after 1948 the station was known as Devonport Albert Road to distinguish it from the ex-London and South Western Railway Kings Road station (now the site of the City College Plymouth). The name reverted to just "Devonport" from 6 May 1968.

The goods shed was originally situated in front of the station near the tunnel entrance, but a new goods yard was opened in about 1892 on a larger site east of the station. This was accessed beneath a girder bridge that carried Valletort Road. The old goods shed and sidings were removed in 1903 and replaced by new sidings which handled milk traffic until 1957.

Valletort Road goods depot was closed in April 1957 and was then used for about forty years by the railway civil engineers. The station became unstaffed from 19 May 1969.

== Location ==
The station is in a cutting at the top of an incline which climbs up from Plymouth. Immediately to the west of the station the line curves sharply to the right and enters a short tunnel. The entrance is on the platform served by trains to Gunnislake and Saltash. The second platform that is served by trains to Plymouth is reached by a footbridge. To walk to Devonport, turn right out of the station, right again over the tunnel. On reaching the main road the shops and Dockyard are down the hill to your left. The Torpoint Ferry can be reached by turning left out of the station and then following the park down the hill. To walk to Stoke, turn left out of the station and at the main road turn left again.

== Services ==
Class 802 pairing passes through with a Penzance service

Devonport is served by Tamar Valley Line services from Plymouth to Gunnislake, and also by certain trains on the Cornish Main Line to and from Penzance, some of which continue eastwards beyond Plymouth towards Exeter St Davids or London Paddington.

Preceding station	National Rail	Following station
Dockyard	Great Western Railway; Cornish Main Line	Plymouth
Dockyard towards Gunnislake	Great Western Railway Tamar Valley Line	Plymouth Terminus

== Signalling ==
The station was initially controlled by disc-and-crossbar signals controlled locally. The first signal box opened on 9 November 1877, a 20-lever box with semaphore signals, but it was extended in about 1892 to 29 levers to accommodate the new goods yard at Valletort Road.

The signal box was replaced by a new one in October 1899 when the line was doubled to Keyham. It closed on 26 November 1960 since when multiple-aspect signals have been controlled by the panel signal box at Plymouth railway station.

== Community railway ==
The railway from Plymouth to Gunnislake is designated as a community railway and is supported by marketing provided by the Devon and Cornwall Rail Partnership. The line is promoted as the 'Tamar Valley Line'.

== See also ==
- Albert Road Halt railway station (the nearby small LSWR station)
- Railways in Plymouth
