= Dockyard railway station =

Railway station in Devon, England

Dockyard
- The platforms looking in the direction of Plymouth

General information
- Location: Devonport, Plymouth; England
- Coordinates: 50.3825°N 4.176°W
- Grid reference: SX453558
- Manager: Great Western Railway
- Platforms: 2

Other information
- Station code: DOC
- Classification: DfT category F2

History
- Original company: Great Western Railway

Key dates
- Opened: 1905

Passengers
- 2021/22: ▲7,154
- 2022/23: ▲8,960
- 2023/24: ▲14,424
- 2024/25: ▲15,102
- 2025/26: ▲17,168
Location
Notes
- Passenger statistics from the Office of Rail and Road

Dockyard railway station is a Great Western Railway suburban station on the Cornish Main Line in Devonport, Plymouth, England. As the name implies, it serves Devonport Dockyard. It is 248 miles 60 chains (400.3 km) from London Paddington via Box and Plymouth Millbay.

== History ==
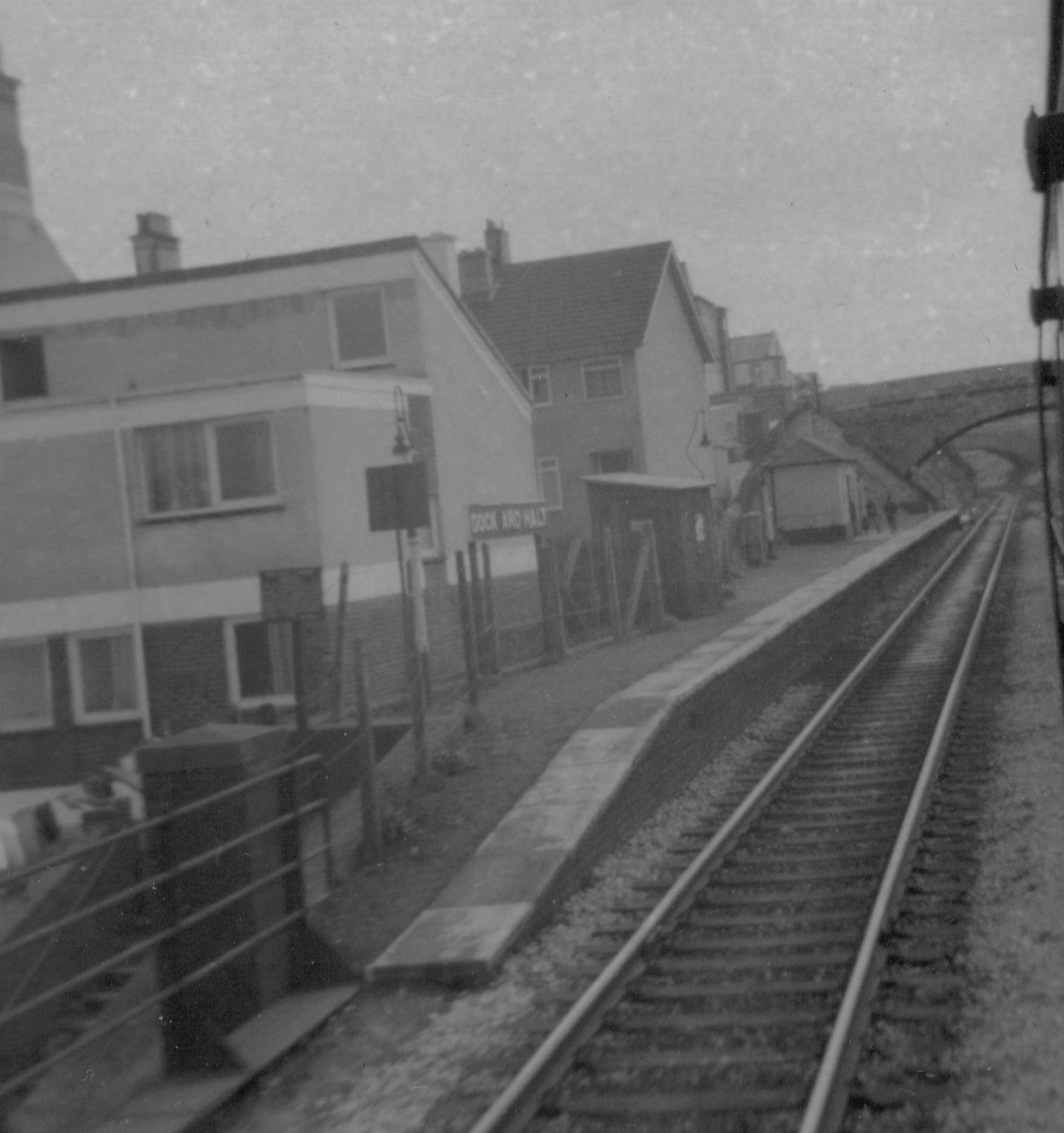
Up platform in 1970.

This station was opened by the Great Western Railway on 1 June 1905, one of many halts built to combat the competition from electric trams.

The Great Western Railway was nationalised into British Railways from 1 January 1948 which was in turn privatised in the 1990s.

== Facilities ==
The station has basic amenities only: a shelter on platform 1, plus bike racks and timetable poster boards on both sides. No staffing or ticket facilities are available, so intending passengers must buy on board the train or prior to travel. Step-free access is available to each platform.

== Services ==
Dockyard is served by Tamar Valley Line services from Plymouth to Gunnislake and also by a few trains on the Cornish Main Line to and from Penzance, some of which continue eastwards beyond Plymouth towards Exeter St Davids. Only Tamar Valley line trains call here on Sundays.

Preceding station	National Rail	Following station
Keyham	Great Western Railway; Cornish Main Line	Devonport
Keyham towards Gunnislake	Great Western Railway Tamar Valley Line	Devonport towards Plymouth

== Community railway ==
The railway from Plymouth to Gunnislake is designated as a community railway and is supported by marketing provided by the Devon and Cornwall Rail Partnership. The line is promoted under the "Tamar Valley Line" name. It was part of the Dartmoor Sunday Rover network of integrated bus and rail routes.
