= Dartmoor Sunday Rover =

The Dartmoor Sunday Rover was a Devon County Council-supported bus and rail network in Devon, England. It was withdrawn after the 2015 season.

The network included buses operated by Stagecaoch Devon, Country Bus, Dartline and Target Travel. These linked places such as Exeter, Newton Abbot and Plymouth with Tavistock, Widecombe, Gunnislake, Ivybridge, Moretonhampstead and Bovey Tracey. The rail lines included were the Tamar Valley Line from Plymouth to Gunnislake and a special Sunday service from Exeter to Okehampton where it connected with the heritage Dartmoor Railway.
