= InterCity Place =

Coordinates: 50.3774°N 4.1433°W

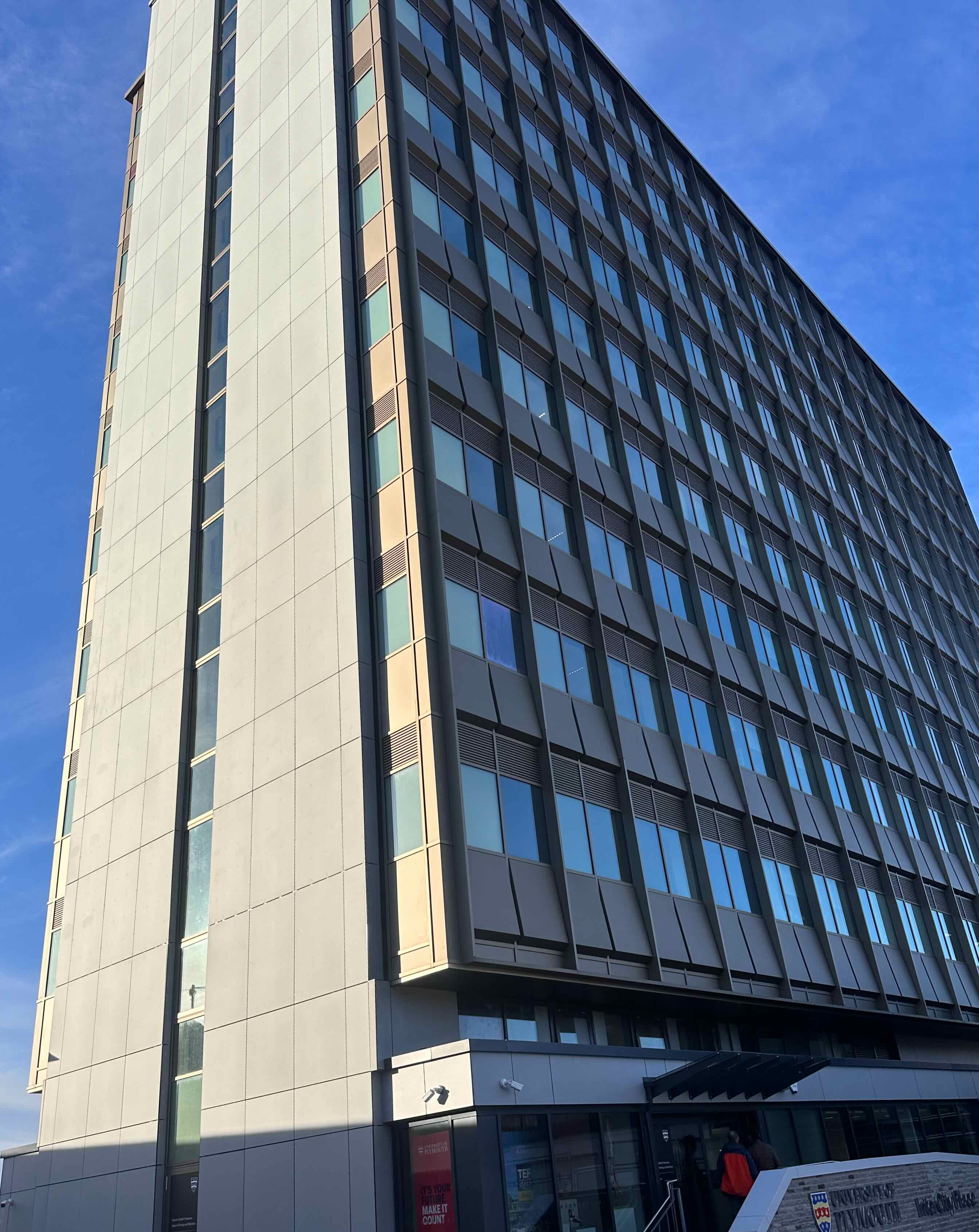
- InterCity Place in 2025
- Interactive map of the InterCity Place area
- Former names: Intercity House

General information
- Status: Completed
- Type: University building
- Location: North Road West, Plymouth, Devon, PL4 6AB
- Completed: 1962
- Renovated: 2014, 2020-2023
- Owner: Network Rail

Height
- Roof: 47.20 m (154.9 ft)

Technical details
- Floor count: 11

Design and construction
- Architects: Howard Cavanagh and Ian Campbell (Intercity House), MICA (InterCity Place)

Renovating team
- Engineer: MICA
- Main contractor: Kier Group

Website
- https://www.plymouth.ac.uk/about-us/intercity-place

InterCity Place is a 11 storey building at Plymouth railway station, the main rail station in Plymouth, Devon. The building was previously called Intercity House and was used as an office building.

InterCity Place has 11 stories and is 47.2 m high and is one of the tallest buildings in Plymouth (2018).

== History ==
Intercity House was built when work to rebuild the railway station was started by the Great Western Railway in the 1930s but was delayed due to World War II. Work was restarted by British Railways in 1956 to the designs of architects Howard Cavanagh and Ian Campbell as part of the post war reconstruction detailed in "A Plan for Plymouth" put forward by Sir Patrick Abercrombie at the request of Plymouth City Councillors.

The modernised station, including the tower block of offices, was opened in 1962 by Dr Beeching,

The building was scheduled for a major update in 2014 as part of a ten-year plan to improve the facilities at the station.

=== Proposed demolition ===
The Heart of South West Local Transport Board published proposals to redevelop Plymouth railway station in 2017. The aim was to provide an improved 'gateway to the city' and would have included the creation of a public square in front of the station. This would have included the demolition of Intercity House. This demolition never went ahead, and it was instead planned to be converted into a building for the University of Plymouth.

=== Conversion to University Building ===
In 2019 the University of Plymouth unveiled plans to renovate the building and convert it into a new teaching building, renaming it to InterCity Place in the process. The building has 11 floors and an illuminated "halo" light beacon on top.

InterCity Place is a part of a 10-year masterplan by the University of Plymouth. The repurposed building provides a space to train and nurses, midwives and allied health professionals from the School of Health Professions and School of Nursing and Midwifery. The building cost £33 million to upgrade.

Network Rail retained ownership of the building and are leasing it to the University for 150 years. The conversion was worked on by construction contractor Kier Group and opened in 2024. During the construction works a fire broke out in the building resulting in the railway station being evacuated, nobody was hurt in the incident.

== See also ==
- University of Plymouth
- Plymouth railway station
