= St Budeaux Ferry Road railway station =

Railway station in Devon, England

St Budeaux Ferry Road
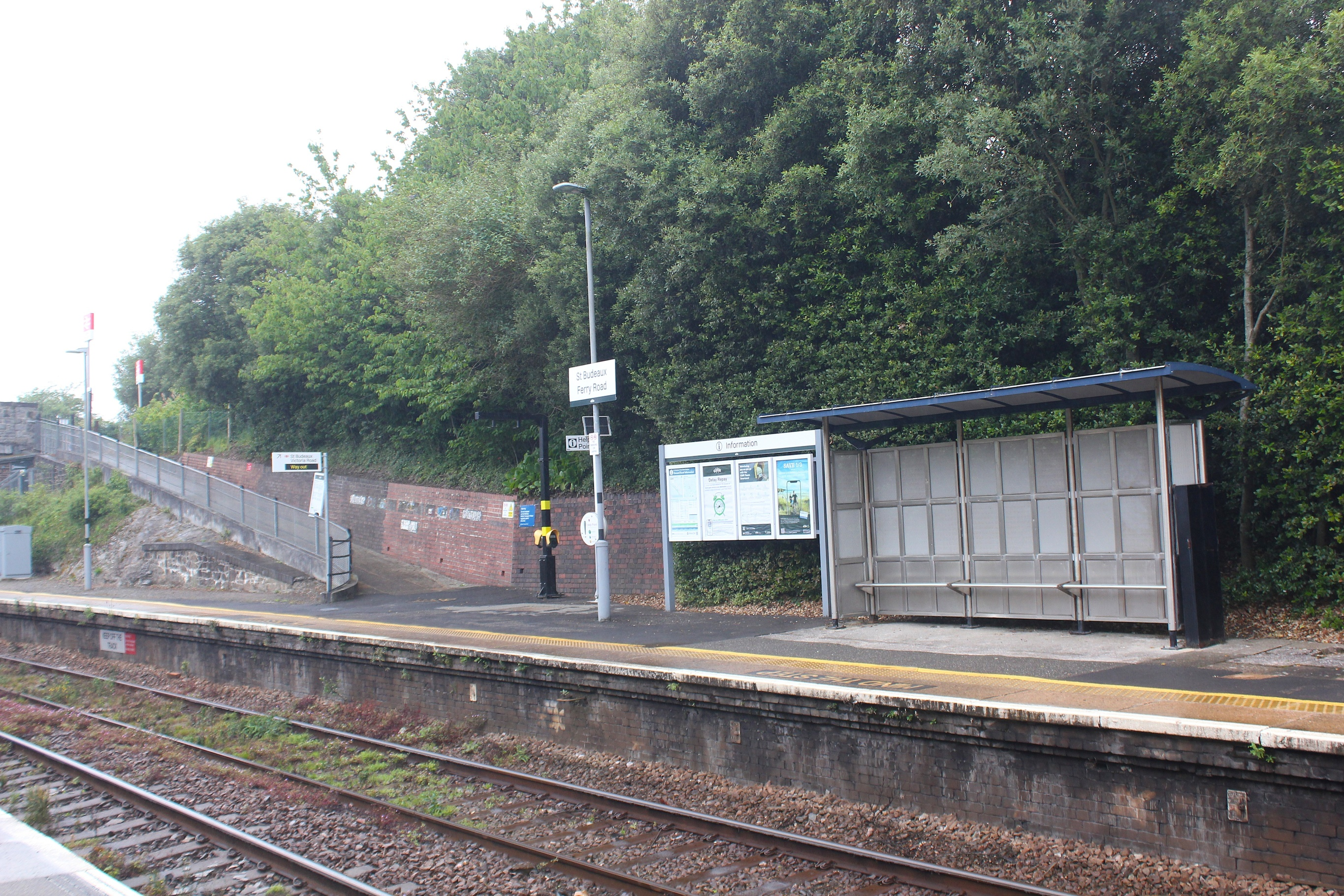
- Platform 2 for services to Plymouth

General information
- Location: St Budeaux, Plymouth; England
- Coordinates: 50.40141°N 4.18680°W
- Grid reference: SX446580
- Manager: Great Western Railway
- Platforms: 2

Other information
- Station code: SBF
- Classification: DfT category F2

History
- Original company: Great Western Railway

Key dates
- 1904: Opened as St Budeaux Halt
- 1906: Renamed St Budeaux Platform
- 1949: Renamed St Budeaux Ferry Road

Passengers
- 2021/22: ▲2,444
- 2022/23: ▲2,508
- 2023/24: ▲4,594
- 2024/25: ▼4,484
- 2025/26: ▲6,072
Location
Notes
- Passenger statistics from the Office of Rail and Road

St Budeaux Ferry Road railway station is a suburban station in St Budeaux, Plymouth, England. It is 3 miles 7 chains (5.0 km) from Plymouth railway station and has a limited service of Great Western Railway trains on the Cornish Main Line.

== History ==
The station was opened by the Great Western Railway (GWR) on 1 June 1904 as 'St Budeaux Halt', one of several local stations opened for new rail motor services. The station was renamed 'St Budeaux Platform' in 1906 when the platforms were made wider and longer, and a ticket office built on the southbound (towards Plymouth) side.

A signal box was built to the south of the station to control the access to the Admiralty sidings at Bull Point. It opened on 2 June 1916 and was known as St Budeaux East to distinguish it from St Budeaux West which controlled trains crossing the Royal Albert Bridge. The East signal box was opened by the station staff when trains needed to access the sidings. From 2 March 1941 it also controlled a junction with the Southern Railway's route between Plymouth and Exeter. This was during World War II and it gave an alternative route to Devonport Dockyard and Plymouth should the main GWR route be blocked.

From September 1949 the station was known as 'St Budeaux Ferry Road' to avoid confusion with the former Southern Railway station at St Budeaux Victoria Road. The entrance to that station, which had opened in 1890, was adjacent to the GWR station. The East signal box was also known as St Budeaux Ferry Road from 22 June 1952. The former Southern Railway line between Victoria Road and Plymouth closed in 1964.

== Description ==
The station is 3 miles 7 chains (5.0 km) from Plymouth railway station although the official location is given as 250 mi 15 chains (402.6 km) from London Paddington (this is measured via Box and the closed station at Plymouth Millbay). There are two tracks through the station but they become a single track 10 chains (200 m) north of the station for the crossing into Cornwall on the Royal Albert Bridge. The junction with the Tamar Valley Line is 15 ch (300 m) to south.

The two platforms are about 400 ft (120 m) long. It is unstaffed with step-free access to both platforms.

== Services ==
St Budeaux Ferry Road has a limited service of Great Western Railway trains on the Cornish Main Line between Plymouth, Liskeard and Penzance, some of which continue eastwards from Plymouth towards Exeter St Davids and beyond. The Sunday service is just two trains each way, to Penzance in the morning and to Plymouth in the evening. A more frequent service to Plymouth operates from St Budeaux Victoria Road on the Tamar Valley Line.

Preceding station	National Rail	Following station
Keyham	Great Western Railway; Cornish Main Line	Saltash
