= Tavy (disambiguation) =

Tavy may refer to:

- River Tavy, a river in Dartmoor, Devon, England
- HMS Tavy, a Royal Navy frigate of the River class
- Tavy, a slash-and-burn technique used in Madagascan agriculture

== Similar ==
- Mary Tavy, an English village
- Peter Tavy, an English village
- Tavy Bridge, a structure over the Tavy river
