= The Viaduct =

1939 novel by Alan Gould

- First edition
- Author: Victor Canning
- Language: English
- Genre: Historical drama
- Publisher: Hodder and Stoughton
- Publication date: 1939
- Publication place: United Kingdom
- Media type: Print
- Pages: 320

The Viaduct is a 1939 historical novel by the British writer Victor Canning, under the pen name of Alan Gould. The novel revolves around the construction of a railway viaduct across the River Tamar in the Cornish village Caradon in the 1870s overseen by the engineer John Seabright. It faces many obstacles including an outbreak of typhoid and the constant tension between the local inhabitants and the rough navvies brought into build it, ending up in a death and a trial.

The story was based on the real-life construction of the Calstock Viaduct which actually took place thirty years after the novel is set in the Edwardian Era. Canning, a native of nearby Plymouth, had some of his childhood living in the area.

== Bibliography ==
- Reilly, John M. Twentieth Century Crime & Mystery Writers. Springer, 2015.
