= Keyham railway station =

Railway station in Devon, England

Keyham
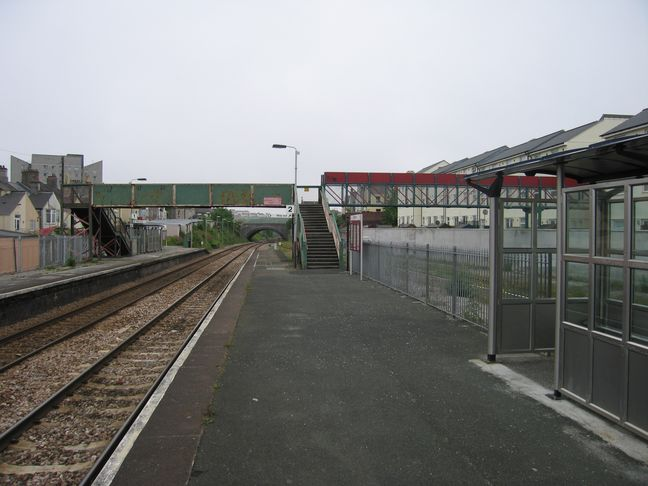

General information
- Location: Keyham, Plymouth; England
- Coordinates: 50.39008°N 4.17984°W
- Grid reference: SX451567
- Manager: Great Western Railway
- Platforms: 2

Other information
- Station code: KEY
- Classification: DfT category F2

History
- Original company: Great Western Railway

Key dates
- Opened: 1900

Passengers
- 2021/22: ▲8,786
- 2022/23: ▲13,530
- 2023/24: ▲17,060
- 2024/25: ▼16,126
- 2025/26: ▲20,770
Location
Notes
- Passenger statistics from the Office of Rail and Road

Keyham railway station is a suburban station in the city of Plymouth, Devon, England. It is 249 miles 25 chains (401.2 km) from London Paddington via Box and Plymouth Millbay. The station is close to the Devonport dockyard.

== History ==
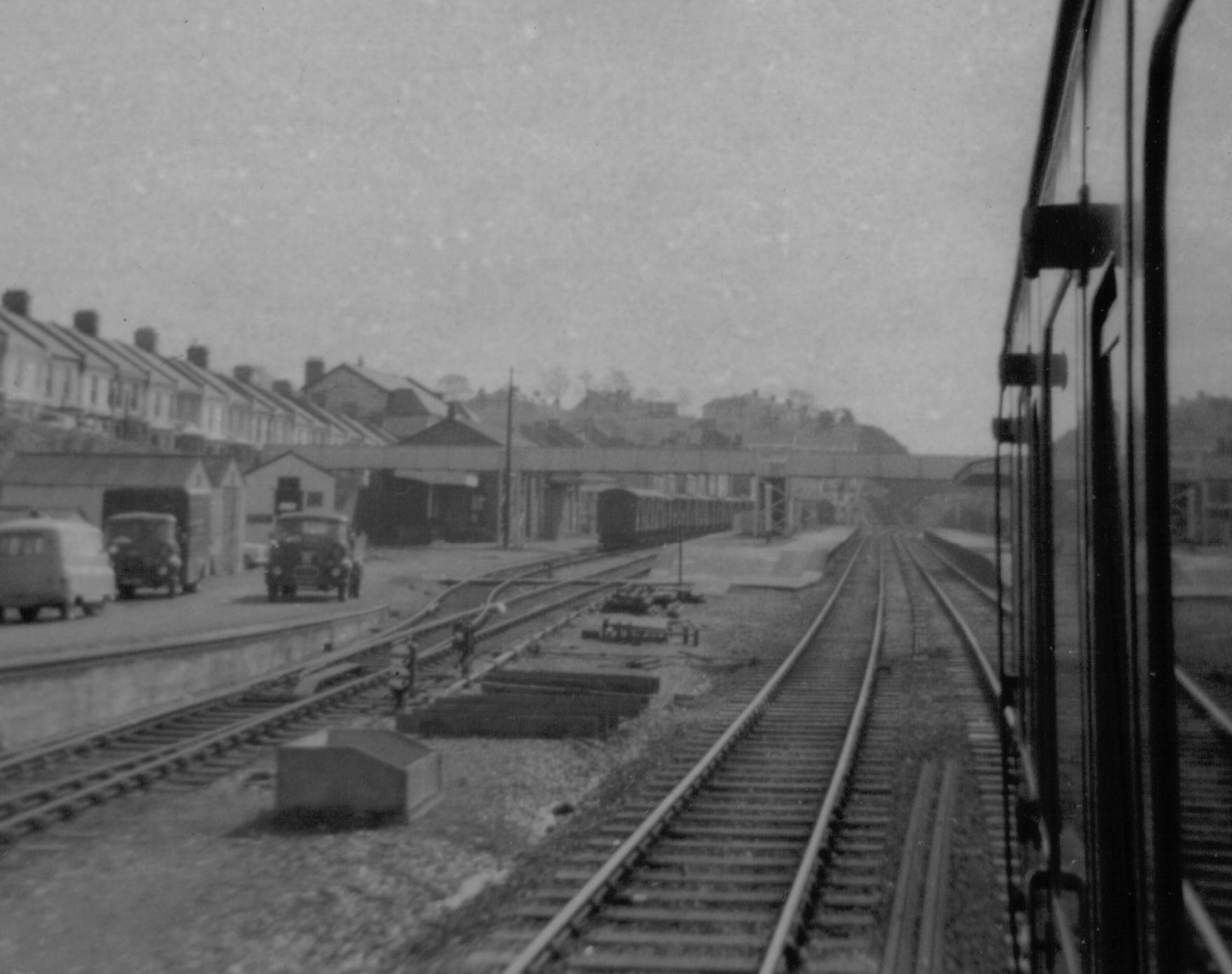
Keyham railway station from a Gunnislake-bound train in 1970.

The station was opened by the Great Western Railway on 1 June 1900. The goods facilities were used for marshalling trains to and from the Cornwall Railway branch into the naval dockyard, opened on 20 June 1867, which enters the dockyard between the station and Weston Mill viaduct.

The Cornwall Railway was amalgamated into the Great Western Railway on 1 July 1889.

On 19 July 1965, Keyham Station was closed to goods traffic, with the siding to the goods shed taken out of use on 22 April 1966. On 19 May 1969 the station was reduced to an unstaffed halt.

The station was the most westward point which a GWR King class locomotive was permitted to operate.

== Platform layout ==
The entrance is on the down platform, served by trains to Gunnislake and Cornwall. The up platform, reached by a footbridge, is served by trains to Plymouth.

== Services ==
Keyham is served by Tamar Valley Line services from Plymouth to Gunnislake, and by a few trains on the Cornish Main Line to and from Penzance, some of which continue eastwards towards Exeter St Davids.

Preceding station	National Rail	Following station
St Budeaux Victoria Road towards Gunnislake	Great Western Railway Tamar Valley Line	Dockyard towards Plymouth
St Budeaux Ferry Road	Great Western Railway; Cornish Main Line	Dockyard

== Community railway ==
The railway from Plymouth to Gunnislake—which passes through Keyham—is designated as the "Tamar Valley Line" community railway and is supported by marketing provided by the Devon and Cornwall Rail Partnership. It is part of the Dartmoor Sunday Rover network of integrated bus and rail routes.

== Bibliography ==
- Beck, Keith; Copsey, John (1990). The Great Western in South Devon. Didcot: Wild Swan Publication. ISBN 0-906867-90-8.
- Cooke, R A (1979). Track Layout Diagrams of the GWR and BR WR: Section 12, Plymouth. Harwell: R A Cooke.
- Crozier, Larry (2000). Mechanical Signalling in Plymouth. Wallasey: Signalling Record Society. ISBN 1-873228-18-X.
- Jacobs, Gerald (2005). Railway Track Diagrams Book 3: Western. Bradford-on-Avon: Trackmaps. ISBN 0-9549866-1-X.
- Leitch, Russell (2002). Plymouth's Railways in the 1930s. Peterborough: Railway Correspondence and Travel Society. ISBN 0-901115-91-6.
- Mosley, Brian (17 February 2007). "Keyham Station (GWR)". Encyclopaedia of Plymouth History. Plymouth Data. Archived from the original on 18 May 2008.
