= Calstock railway station =

Railway station in Cornwall, England

Calstock Kalstok
- The platform, looking north

General information
- Location: Calstock, Cornwall; England
- Coordinates: 50.498°N 4.209°W
- Grid reference: SX433688
- Manager: Great Western Railway
- Platforms: 1

Other information
- Station code: CSK
- Classification: DfT category F2

Passengers
- 2021/22: ▲27,566
- 2022/23: ▲31,616
- 2023/24: ▲34,506
- 2024/25: ▲38,968
- 2025/26: ▼38,692
Location
Notes
- Passenger statistics from the Office of Rail and Road

Calstock railway station (Cornish: Kalstok) is an unstaffed railway station on the Tamar Valley Line serving the village of Calstock in Cornwall, United Kingdom. It is situated at the north end of Calstock Viaduct which carries the railway at high level over the River Tamar.

== History ==
The 3 ft 6 in (1,067 mm) gauge East Cornwall Mineral Railway was opened to Kelly Quay at Calstock on 8 May 1872. Wagons with goods from the mines around Gunnislake and Callington were brought down the hillside on a 0.4 miles (0.6 km) cable-worked incline with a gradient of 1 in 6 (17%).

The Plymouth, Devonport and South Western Junction Railway opened the station on 2 March 1908. This line was a branch from Bere Alston to Callington Road and crossed the River Tamar on Calstock Viaduct.

A steam-powered lift was attached to the downstream side of the viaduct which could raise and lower wagons to the quays 113 feet (34 m) below, making it one of the highest such lifts in the country. It was connected to the station goods yard by a second parallel steel stub viaduct. A short section of the narrow gauge line was retained to serve a lime kiln, but the wagon lift and all the sidings were taken out of use in September 1934.

Fruit and flowers were an important part of the traffic carried on the railway and were still carried by train from Calstock until the mid-1970s.

== Platform layout ==
The single platform – on the right of trains arriving from Plymouth – is situated on a sharp curve which makes it difficult to see trains approaching from Gunnislake.

== Services ==
Class 150 leaves for Gunnislake

Calstock is served by trains on the Tamar Valley Line from Gunnislake to Plymouth. Connections with main line services can be made at Plymouth. All services are operated by Class 150 Sprinter units.

Preceding station	National Rail	Following station
Gunnislake Terminus	Great Western Railway Tamar Valley Line	Bere Alston towards Plymouth

== Community railway ==
The railway from Plymouth to Gunnislake is designated as a community railway and is supported by marketing provided by the Devon and Cornwall Rail Partnership. The line is promoted under the "Tamar Valley Line" name.

The Tamar Inn in Calstock is part of the Tamar Valley Line rail ale trail, which is designed to promote the use of the line.

== Calstock Viaduct ==
Calstock Viaduct
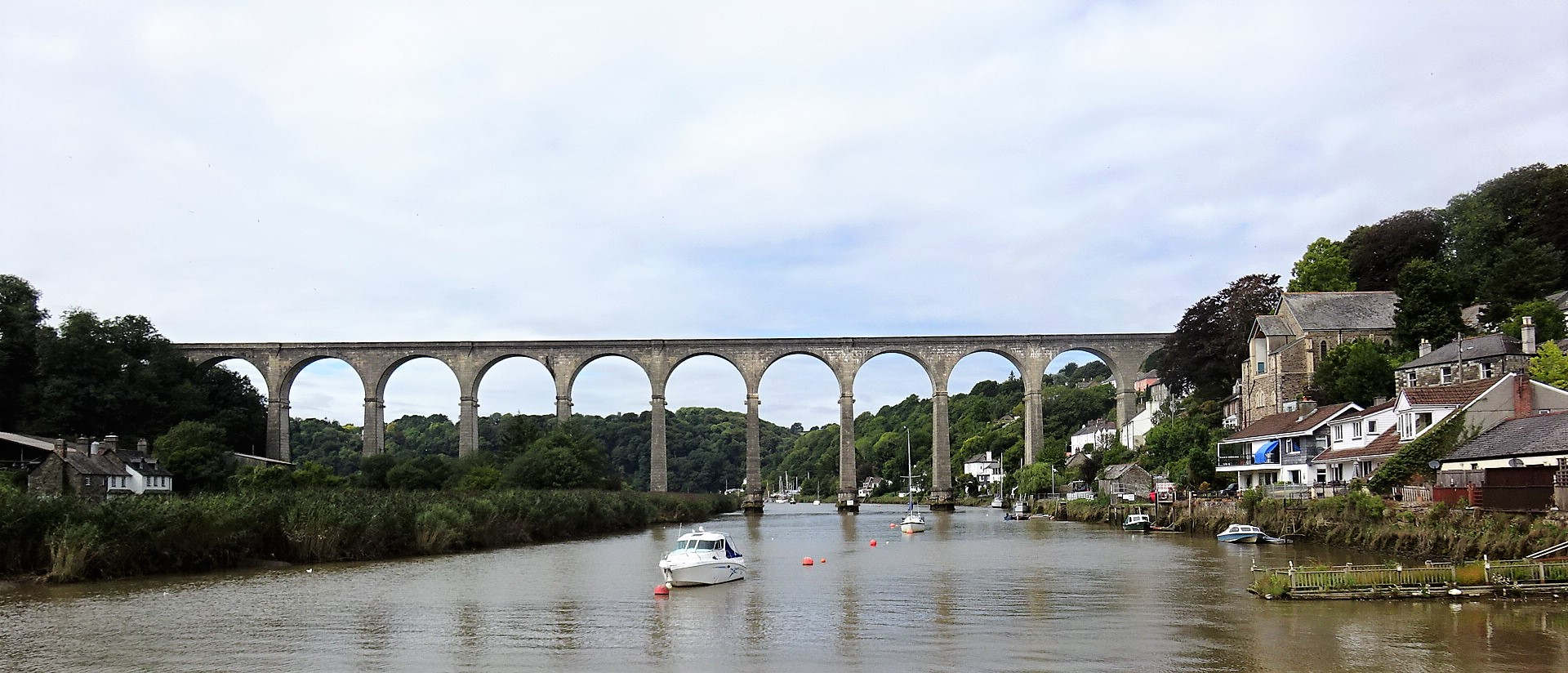
- Calstock Viaduct in 2018
- Interactive map of Calstock Viaduct

Listed Building – Grade II*
- Official name: Calstock Viaduct
- Designated: 23 January 1968
- Reference no.: 1138329

The viaduct is 120 feet (37 m) high with twelve 60 feet (18 m) wide arches, and a further small arch in the Calstock abutment. Three of the piers stand in the River Tamar, which is tidal at this point and has a minimum clearance at high tide of 110 feet (34 m).

It was built between 1904 and 1907 by John Lang of Liskeard using 11,148 concrete blocks. These were cast in a temporary yard on the Devon bank opposite the village. The engineers were Richard Church and W. R. Galbraith.

It is a Grade II* listed structure.

The construction of the viaduct provided the background to the 1939 novel The Viaduct by Victor Canning, set in the fictional village of Caradon which was closely modelled on Calstock.
