= Howard Cavanagh =

English architect

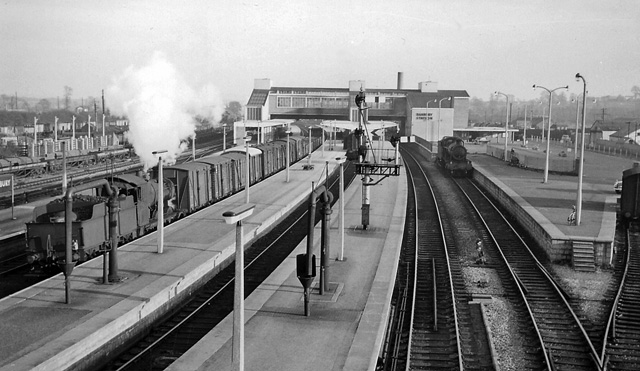
Banbury railway station in 1961

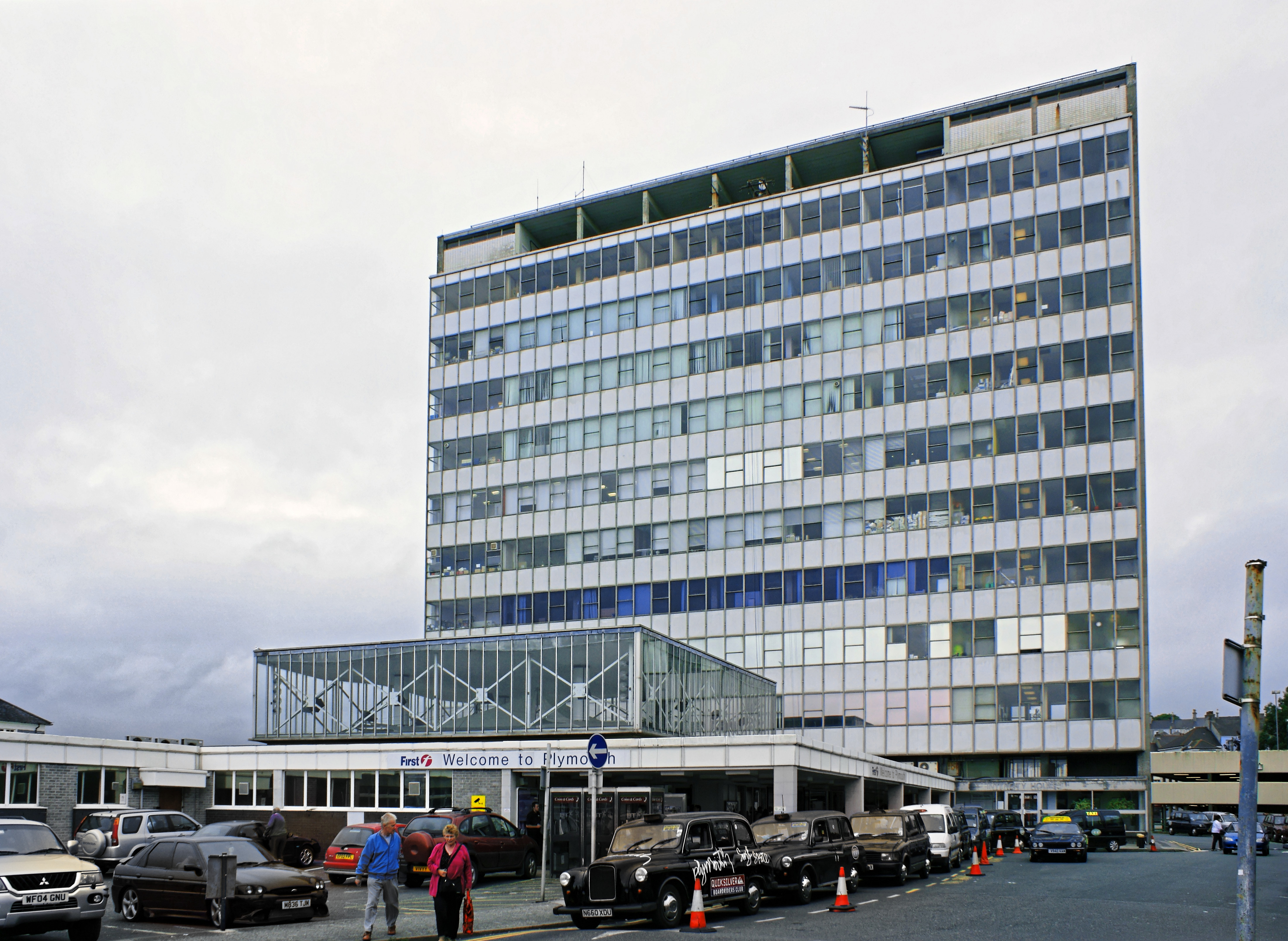
Plymouth railway station

Howard Earnest Bernard Cavanagh FRIBA (17 August 1910 – 3 August 1960) was an English architect.

== Career ==
H.E.B. Cavanagh was born in India, the eldest son of Bernard Cavanagh (b. 1877) and Annie. He arrived in London on the P&O ship Mongolia from India on 2 May 1915.

He married fellow architect Beryl Joy Sarita Read (1908-1982) on 27 October 1934 at St Mary’s Church, Wootton-under-Edge. She was the daughter of Mr and Mrs H. A. Read of Holywell Cottage, Wotton-under-Edge, and an Associate of the Royal Institute of British Architects. They have two sons. Their eldest, Terence D Cavanagh, was born on 1 November 1940. Their second son, Sean M Cavanagh, was born on 30 July 1949.

During the Second World War he was a Lieutenant in the King’s Regiment.

In 1947, he was appointed by the Great Western Railway as Assistant Architect at Paddington. He later became Architect to the Western Region of British Railways.

He worked with Frederick Curtis and R.H. Jones on the western extension of the Central line (London Underground).

In 1956 he started work with Ian J Campbell on the redesign of Plymouth railway station, but he died before its completion. The work was completed by Ray Moorcroft.

He died in a boating accident off the Isle of Wight on 3 August 1960.

== Notable works ==
- South Ruislip railway station 1948 with Frederick Curtis and R.H. Jones
- Cirencester Town railway station 1956 (additions)
- Banbury railway station 1958
- Plymouth railway station 1958-62 (with Ian Campbell)
