= Tavy Bridge =

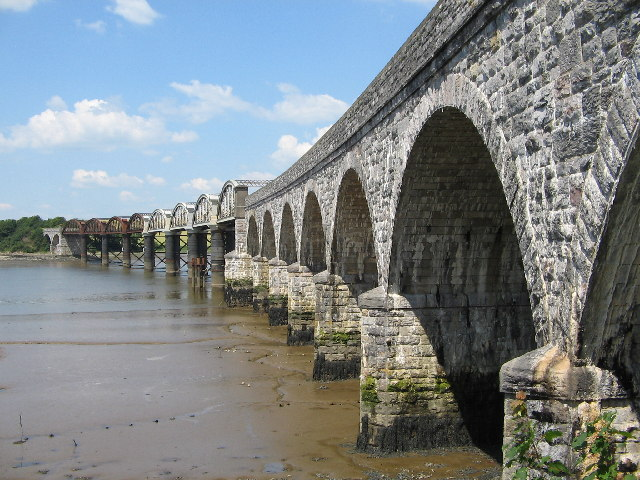
- Coordinates: 50.4326207°N 4.1835809°W
- Carries: Tamar Valley Line
- Crosses: Mouth of River Tavy
- Locale: Bere Ferrers
- Maintained by: Network Rail

Characteristics
- Total length: 453 metres (1,486 ft)
- Width: 10 metres (33 ft)
- Longest span: Seventeen
- Piers in water: Sixteen

Tavy Bridge is a railway bridge across the mouth of the River Tavy just east of its confluence with the River Tamar. It was built by the Plymouth, Devonport and South Western Junction Railway, and the Tavy Bridge was constructed to carry the track over the Tavy Estuary and the adjoining mudflats. The bridge is a Grade II listed building, with both ends being listed separately.

== Structure ==
The Tavy Bridge spans the estuary of the River Tavy. It is a railway bridge carrying the Tamar Valley Line and opened in 1889. The centre part of the bridge spans the deepwater channel and is made up of eight iron bowstring braced girders supported by seven pairs of circular cast iron pillars with pediment caps. To north and south, sections of stone arch viaduct cross the tidal mudflats, connecting the central section to the shore, two arches to the north and seven to the south of the main bridge. The part of the bridge in South Hams District has been a Grade II listed building since 2 February 1984, and the part in the civil parish of Bere Ferrers has been similarly designated since 26 January 1987.

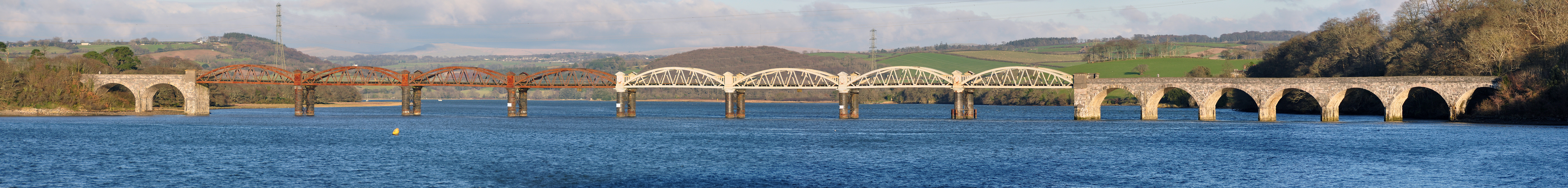

== History ==
The Plymouth, Devonport and South Western Junction Railway (PD&SWJR) was an English railway company; it constructed a main line railway between Lydford and Devonport, in Devon, England, enabling the London and South Western Railway to reach Plymouth more conveniently than previously. The company was formed in 1883 and the railway line from Lydford to Devonport, which included this bridge over the Tavy Estuary, was opened in 1890. It was built by the Plymouth, Devonport and South Western Junction Railway, headed by William Hardy to carry the line from St Budeaux to Bere Alston, now part of the Tamar Valley Line

The line was operated by the London and South Western Railway which had put up some of the capital in the Company. The London and South Western Railway eventually took over the running of the line in 1922. The part of the bridge in South Hams District is a Grade II listed building, having been so designated on 2 February 1984.
