= Saltash railway station =

Railway station in Cornwall, England

Saltash Essa
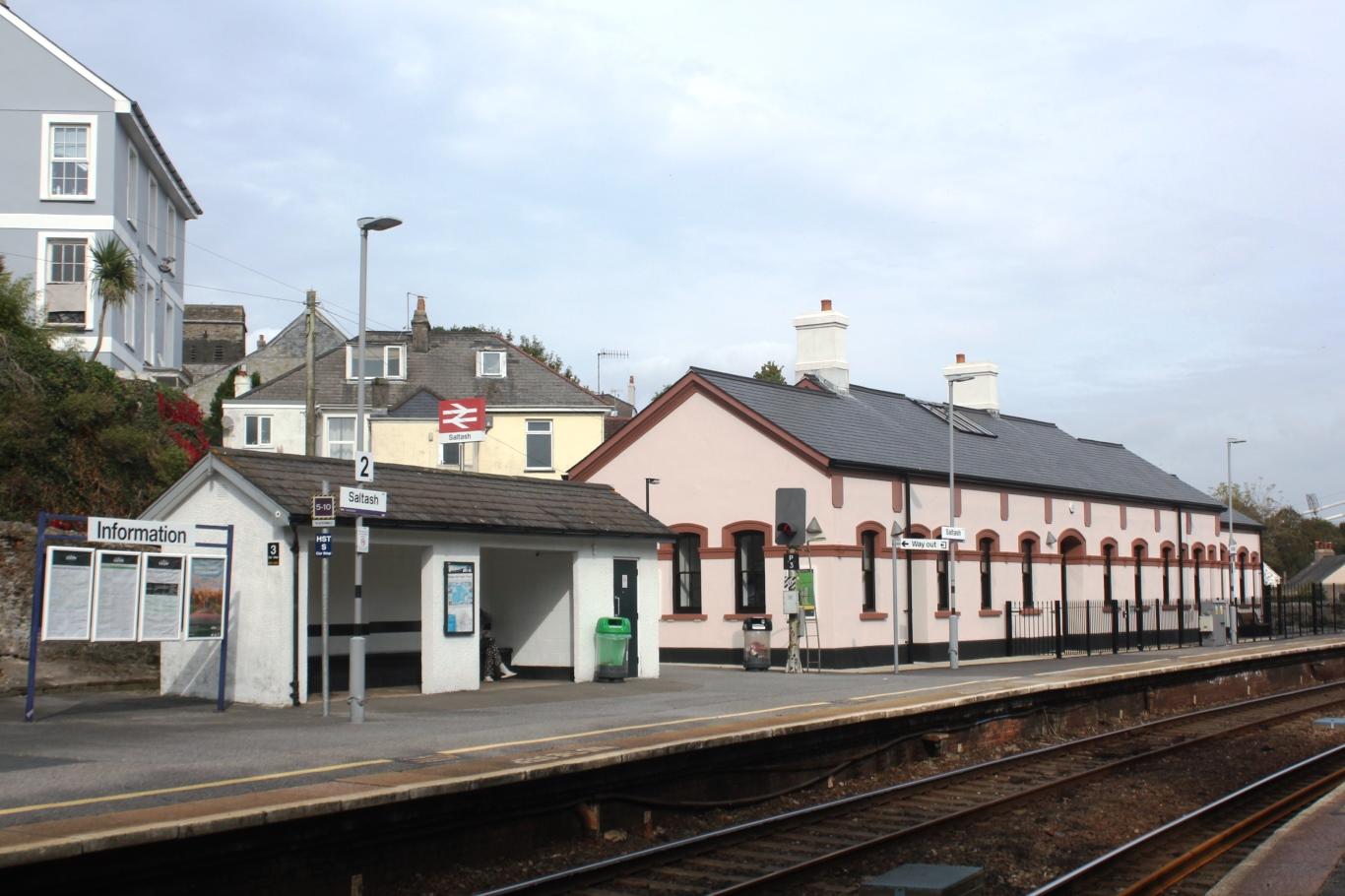

General information
- Location: Saltash, Cornwall; England
- Coordinates: 50.407°N 4.209°W
- Grid reference: SX431587
- Managed by: Great Western Railway
- Platforms: 2

Other information
- Station code: STS
- Classification: DfT category F2

History
- Original company: Cornwall Railway
- Pre-grouping: Great Western Railway
- Post-grouping: Great Western Railway

Key dates
- Opened: 1859

Passengers
- 2020/21: ▼41,154
- 2021/22: ▲117,598
- 2022/23: ▲137,008
- 2023/24: ▲144,698
- 2024/25: ▲162,224
Location
Notes
- Passenger statistics from the Office of Rail and Road

Saltash railway station (Cornish: Essa) serves the town of Saltash in Cornwall, England. It is on the east side of the town between the Royal Albert Bridge which crosses the River Tamar and the Coombe Viaduct which spans a small tributary of the same river. Trains are operated by Great Western Railway. The station is 251 miles 26 chains (404.5 km) from London Paddington via Box and Plymouth Millbay. The line singles at the east end of the station passing over the Royal Albert Bridge.

== History ==
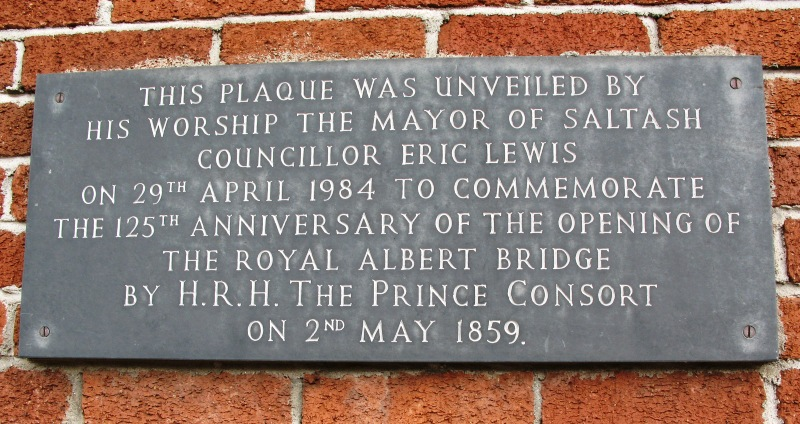
A plaque on the westbound platform commemorates the 125th anniversary opening of the Royal Albert Bridge on 2 May 1859

The station opened with the Cornwall Railway on 4 May 1859. It was described at the time as being "at the head of that town. It consists of an arrival and departure station, both being stone buildings, and possessing all requisite offices for the accommodation of the traffic. New and convenient approaches are likely to be made to that station by the corporation and the owners of adjoining property, which will prove a great public benefit." A goods shed was opened early in 1863 and the station was rebuilt in 1880–1881.

The Cornwall Railway was amalgamated into the Great Western Railway on 1 July 1889. To counter competition from electric trams, the Great Western Railway opened several small stations in Plymouth and began to operate an intensive service of local trains between Saltash, Plymouth and Plympton in July 1904. The services were vastly reduced after the Tamar road bridge opened in 1961. The Great Western Railway was nationalised into British Rail from 1 January 1948 which was in turn privatised in the 1990s.

The unused station building was sold off in the 1990s and fell into disrepair. Saltash Town Council purchased the building in 2017 and — along with Cornwall Council, Great Western Railway, Network Rail and the Railway Heritage Trust — worked to restore the building. The restored building was opened in November 2021, with a waiting room, toilets and refreshments and a community hall.

== Facilities ==
The station is unstaffed and has no ticket vending provision but there are remotely-staffed help points. There are cycle storage racks and very limited car parking. There are covered and open waiting areas and free Wi-Fi. Step-free access is available to both platforms however there is a large step height from the platform which means that ramps cannot be used to access the train.

== Services ==
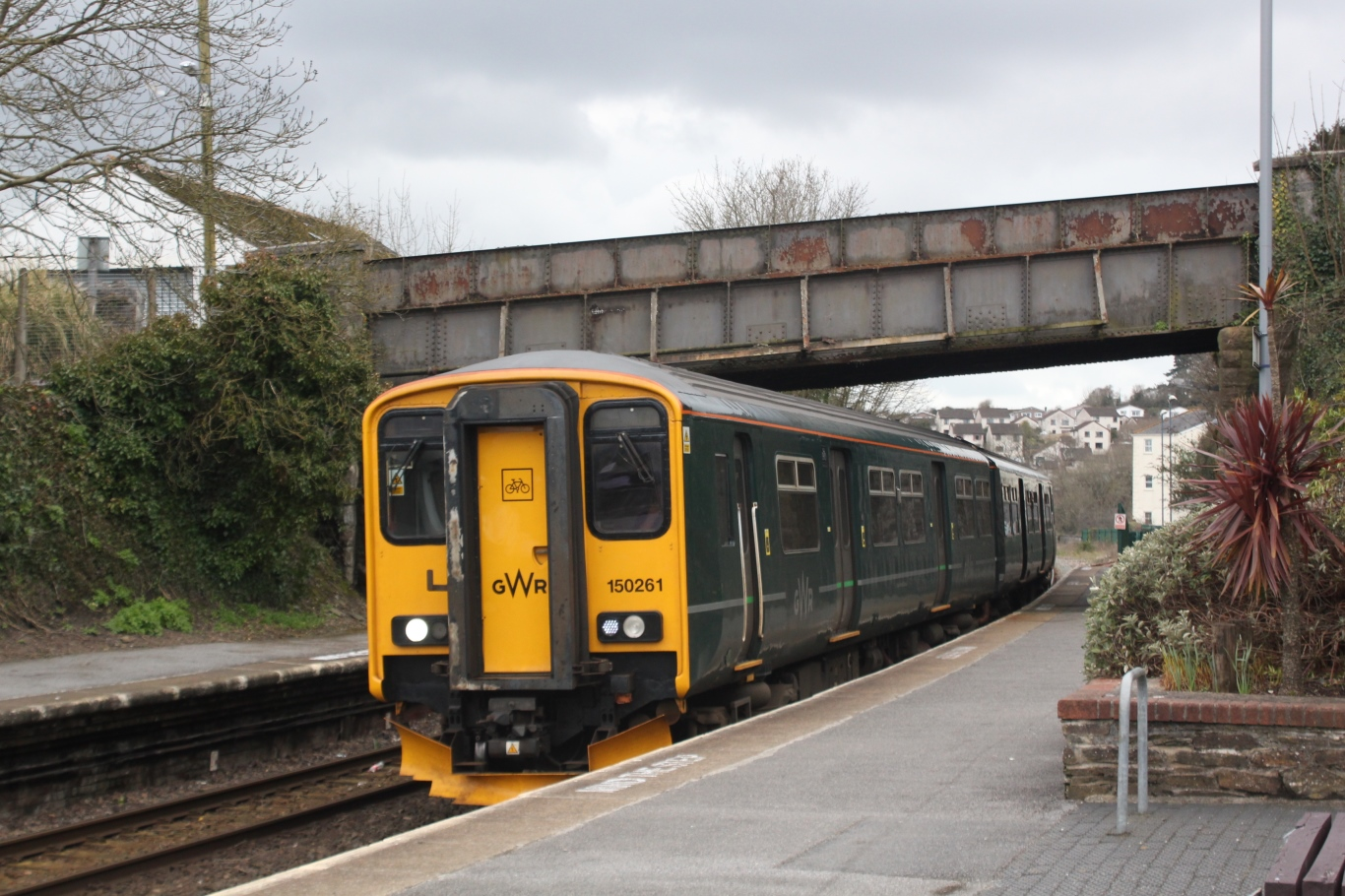
A Great Western Railway Class 150 calls with a Penzance to Plymouth local service

Saltash is served by most Great Western Railway trains on the Cornish Main Line between Penzance and Plymouth including several that run to or from London Paddington. There is typically one train per hour in each direction with additional services in some hours.

Preceding station	National Rail	Following station
St Budeaux Ferry Road	Great Western Railway; Cornish Main Line	St Germans
