= Plymouth railway station =

Railway station in Devon, England

Plymouth
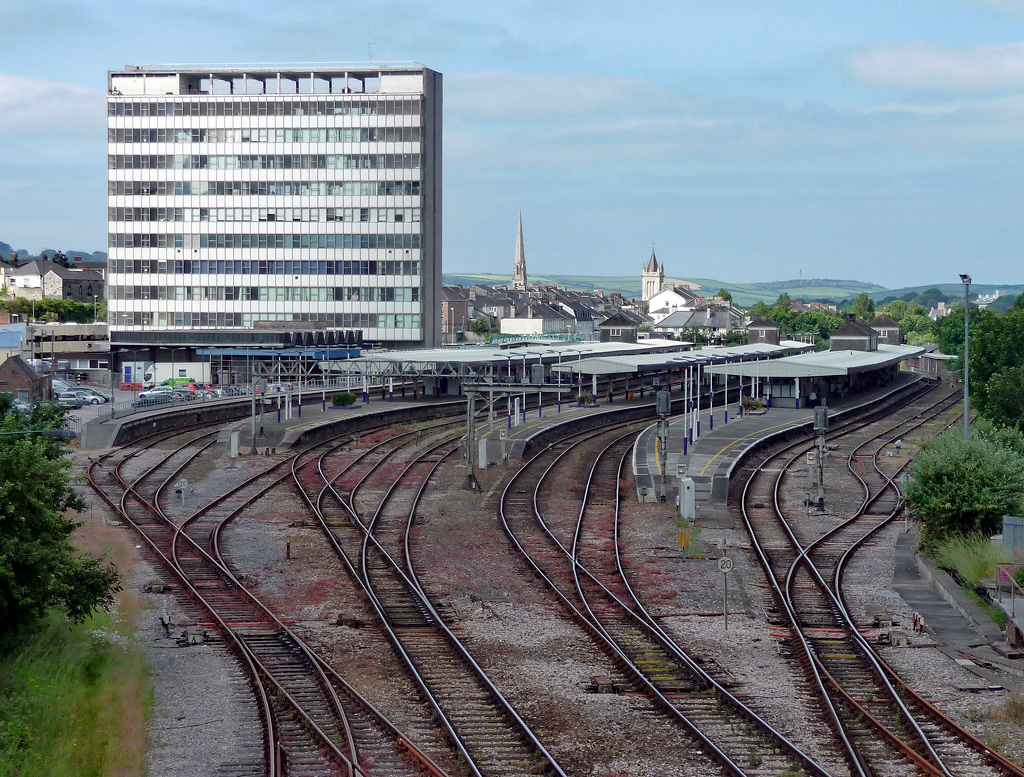
- Platforms and track layout from the east, with the main station building behind.

General information
- Location: Plymouth; England
- Coordinates: 50.3778°N 4.1430°W
- Grid reference: SX476553
- Manager: Great Western Railway
- Platforms: 6 (numbered 3-8)

Other information
- Station code: PLY
- Classification: DfT category C1

History
- Original company: GWR and LSWR Joint
- Post-grouping: GWR and SR Joint

Key dates
- 1877: Opened
- 1938: Rebuilding started
- 1958: North Road name dropped
- 1962: Rebuilding completed

Passengers
- 2021/22: ▲1.992 million
- Interchange: ▲75,788
- 2022/23: ▲2.313 million
- Interchange: ▲90,291
- 2023/24: ▲2.439 million
- Interchange: ▲0.121 million
- 2024/25: ▲2.673 million
- Interchange: ▲0.128 million
- 2025/26: ▲2.771 million
- Interchange: ▲0.165 million
Location
Notes
- Passenger statistics from the Office of Rail and Road

Plymouth railway station serves the city of Plymouth, Devon, England. It is on the northern edge of the city centre, close to the North Cross roundabout. It is the third busiest station in the county of Devon and the largest of the six surviving stations in Plymouth.

Plymouth is a principal stop on the Exeter–Plymouth line and Cornish Main Line; it is located 245 miles 75 chains (245.94 mi; 395.8 km) from London Paddington, via Box. It is also the usual terminus for the Tamar Valley Line services from Gunnislake. The station is served by Great Western Railway and CrossCountry; it is also managed by the former.

== History ==
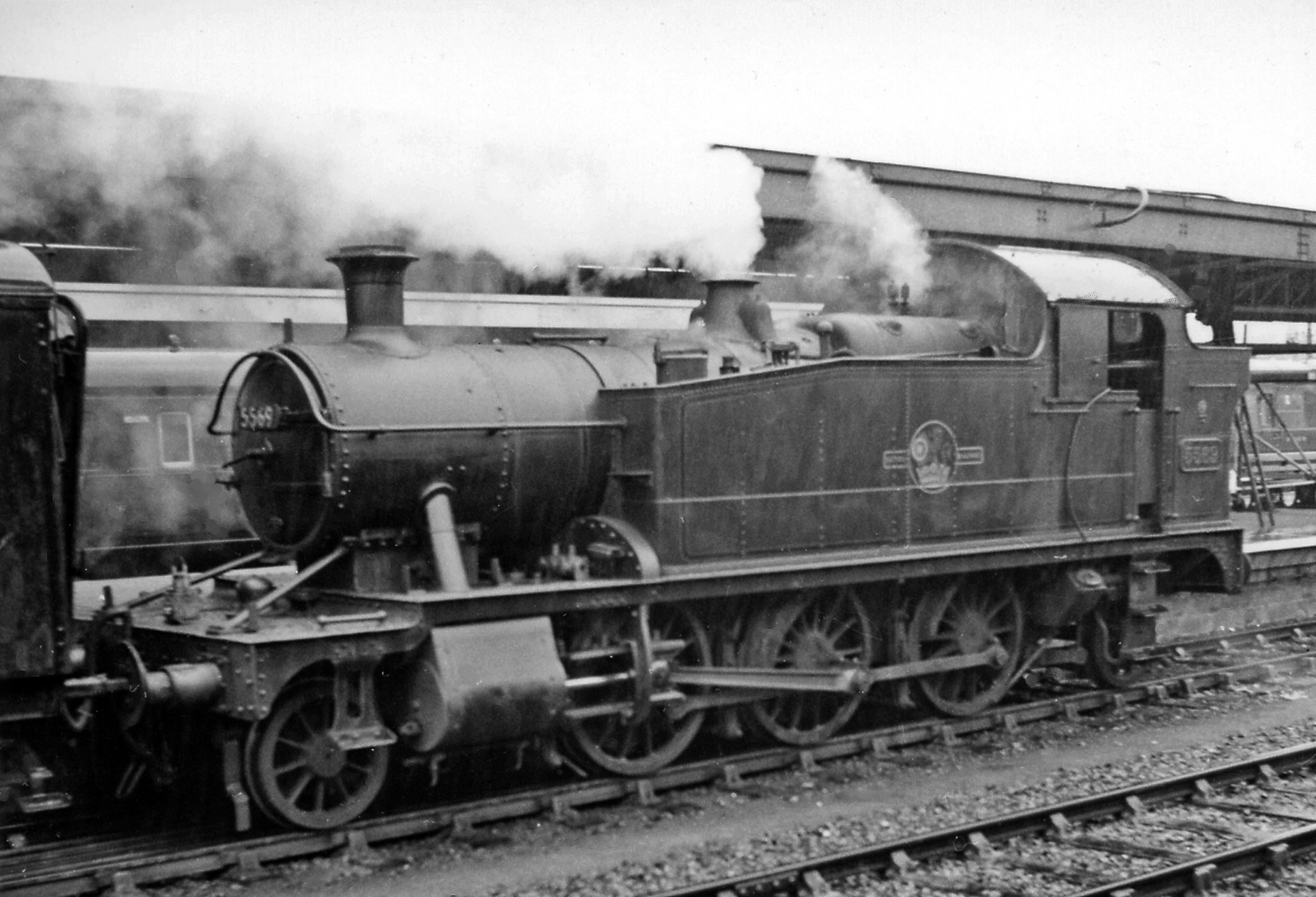
A GWR 'Small Prairie' 2-6-2T at Plymouth in 1958

Originally named Plymouth North Road, it was opened in 1877 as a joint station for the Great Western Railway (GWR) and the London and South Western Railway (LSWR). It was expanded in 1908 but a major rebuilding scheme that started in 1938 was delayed by the Second World War and was not completed until 1962. John Betjeman commented unfavourably on its new form in his introduction to The Book of the Great Western: Plymouth (North Road) dullest of stations and no less dull now it has been rebuilt in copybook contemporary.

The first railway station in Plymouth was opened by the South Devon Railway on 2 April 1849 at Millbay, on the site now occupied by the Plymouth Pavilions. This company amalgamated with the GWR in 1876, just as the LSWR was completing its rival route from London to Plymouth. North Road station was opened on 28 March 1877 to provide a joint facility for trains of both companies. It was just west of the earlier Mutley railway station, while at its west end a new junction allowed direct access to the Cornwall Railway and the LSWR's Devonport Kings Road railway station.

The station was built of wood and the platforms were fully covered by train sheds. It originally had just two through platforms but additional platforms were added in a scheme executed in 1908. Further major rebuilding work started in 1938; one signal box was replaced and the second moved to make way for the new works, and Houndiscombe Road bridge at the east end of the station was rebuilt. Work was soon stopped due to the Second World War but on North Road was increased when Millbay station had to be closed to passengers in 1941 following an air raid.

Preceding station	Historical railways	Following station
Mutley	Great Western Railway	Plymouth Millbay
Mutley	Great Western Railway	Wingfield Villas
Mutley	London and South Western Railway	Devonport Kings Road

The old LSWR Friary station was closed from 15 September 1958, following which North Road was renamed as just 'Plymouth'. Further closures during the next few years of former LSWR stations and GWR branch lines has left just six stations in the city (Devonport, Dockyard, Keyham and two in St Budeaux – Victoria Road and Ferry Road) – although local passengers also come from stations a little further afield such as Saltash, St Germans, Menheniot and Ivybridge.

The rebuilding work was resumed in 1956 to the designs of architect Howard Cavanagh and Ian Campbell and the new station with its large office block, 'Intercity House', was formally opened by Dr Richard Beeching, the British Railways Chairman, on 26 March 1962. The office block was intended to be the northern point of Armada Way, counterbalancing the tower of the Civic Centre at the southern end, in the Abercrombie/Paton-Watson 'Plan for Plymouth'. The station now had seven through platforms, although two of these were converted to terminal bay platforms in 1974. One of these at the west end is usually used for the Tamar Valley Line service but the longer east end bays were used for parcels and for Royal Mail trains until the withdrawal of this traffic from the area in 2003. Outside the station a car park was provided, which was rebuilt in its current multistorey form in the 1970s. In recent times there have been updates to the station.

South West Trains operated two trains per day to and from London Waterloo, one weekend service would continue to Penzance, but South West Trains services were withdrawn beyond Exeter St Davids in December 2009.

=== Accidents and incidents ===
On 3 April 2016, Class 150 diesel multiple unit 150219 collided with a stationary InterCity 125 High Speed Train at platform 6. Class 43 power car 43160 and the DMU were damaged. Forty-six people were injured; one seriously.

== Platform layout ==
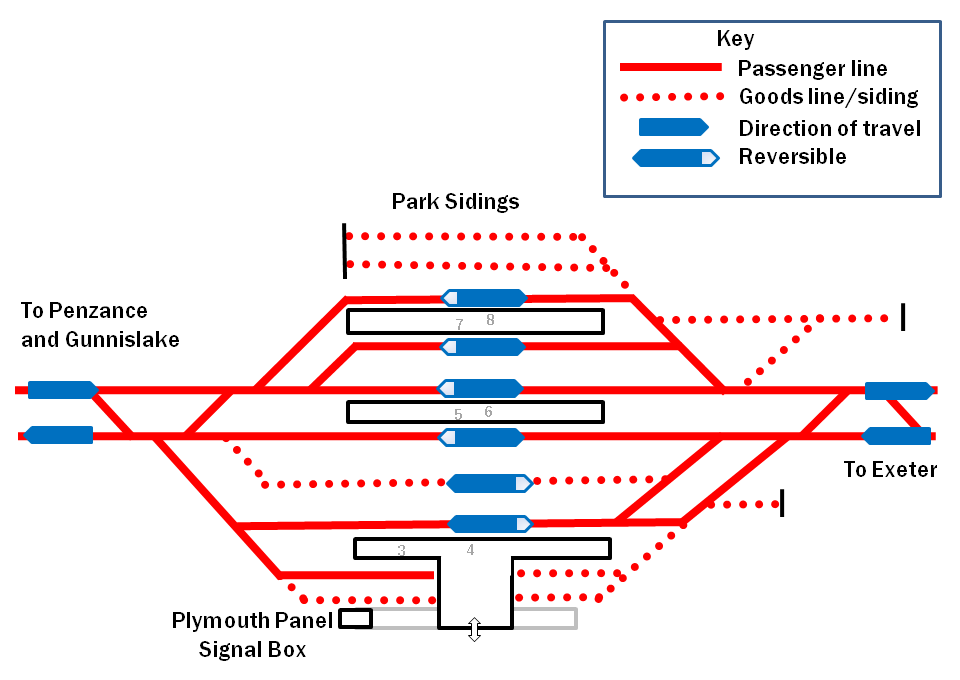
Track layout in 2009

The station has its entrance on the south side which gives access to the city centre. The west side of the station concourse is the ticket office, while on the north side are various retail outlets selling food and newspapers. The buffet on Platforms 7 and 8 is no longer in operation however there is a small café just beyond the ticket barriers serving hot drinks and hot food. The platform area is separated from the concourse by the ticket gates.

The platforms that can be reached on the level from the concourse are numbered 1 to 4. Platforms 1 and 2 are east-facing bay platforms, not used by passenger trains. Platform 3 is a west-facing bay platform that is mainly used by local services to Gunnislake and sometimes Penzance.

The remaining platforms are reached by a subway immediately inside the ticket gates; there are lifts to the subway on each of the groups of platforms. They are all through tracks and are signalled so that trains can arrive and depart in either direction. Platform 4 is used by most through services towards Penzance, but also for some trains towards London. Platforms 5 and 6 are either side of the middle island platform and are used by a variety of services, including Great Western Railway local trains and long distance CrossCountry services. Platforms 7 and 8 are either side of a second island platform; there is a small coffee shop facing the subway steps on this platform. Most Great Western Railway services to London Paddington depart from platform 7, but both these platforms are used by a variety of services from Cornwall towards London and the North as well as some local services.

Beyond Platform 8 are two tracks, known as Park Sidings, which are used for stabling trains between services, but most trains are nowadays kept on the platform tracks between arrival and departure. There are some more sidings adjacent to platform 1. There is an extra track between platforms 4 and 5 for through goods trains and shunting manoeuvres.

=== Brunel Plaza ===
The railway station and surrounding area is undergoing a redevelopment in 2020–2024. InterCity Place, an 11 floor tower next to the station, is being rebuilt for use by the University of Plymouth and the existing three-story car park is being replaced by a new six-story car park on the site of the current Rail Incident Safety Centre building which will be relocated to a new building to the west of the station. The old car park will then be demolished and turned into potential sites for more University buildings including a new accommodation block and a hotel. The construction works began in late 2020, the university building is due to open in 2023, the car park in 2024, and all other works are due to be completed by 2027.

== Services ==
Great Western Railway and CrossCountry trains on platforms 4 and 5

Plymouth is served by Great Western Railway trains on the main line from London Paddington, some of which terminate at Plymouth but many continue over the Cornish Main Line to Penzance or, in the summer, Newquay. Services between London Paddington to Plymouth are at least hourly throughout the day. A number of named trains operate on this route including the Cornish Riviera, a fast London to Penzance daytime service, and the overnight Night Riviera service on the same route.

Most CrossCountry trains from Scotland and the North of England via Bristol terminate at Plymouth, although 2 continue to Penzance, and, on summer weekends, Newquay. From Plymouth, most services terminate at Edinburgh Waverley via Birmingham New Street, however, 1 train per day operates towards both Glasgow Central and Aberdeen respectively.

Local services are provided by Great Western Railway along the Cornish Main Line, often extended eastwards to and from Newton Abbot, Exeter St Davids and beyond. Services are also provided on the Tamar Valley Line to Gunnislake.

Preceding station	National Rail	Following station
Devonport	Great Western Railway; Exeter to Plymouth Line	Ivybridge
Devonport towards Gunnislake	Great Western Railway Tamar Valley Line	Terminus
Liskeard or Terminus	CrossCountry; Cornwall and Plymouth to the North	Totnes

== Passenger volume ==
Plymouth has the third largest number of passengers starting or finishing their journey in Devon, after Exeter Central and Exeter St Davids. Comparing the year from April 2008 to that which started in April 2002, passenger numbers increased by 97%. However, recent years have seen little further growth.

	2002–03	2004–05	2005–06	2006–07	2007–08	2008–09	2009–10	2010–11	2011–12	2012–13	2013–14	2014–15	2015–16	2016–17	2017–18	2018–19
Entries	721,187	767,066	822,804	929,105	1,018,941	1,344,641	1,139,359	1,200,541	1,298,373	1,289,658	1,222,732	1,247,624	1,243,781	1,254,726	1,224,547	1,208,188
Exits	710,487	751,945	806,207	916,808	1,007,910	1,344,640	1,139,359	1,200,541	1,298,373	1,289,658	1,222,732	1,247,624	1,243,781	1,254,726	1,224,547	1,208,188
Interchanges	unknown	55,154	68,832	77,728	61,934	133,496	67,194	73,574	104,598	unknown	88,488	93,423	95,082	100,531	90,299	79,912
Total	1,431,674	1,585,165	1,697,843	1,923,686	2,088,785	2,822,777	2,345,912	2,474,656	2,701,344	2,579,316	2,533,952	2,588,671	2,582,644	2,609,983	2,539,393	2,496,288

The statistics cover twelve month periods that start in April.

== Signalling ==
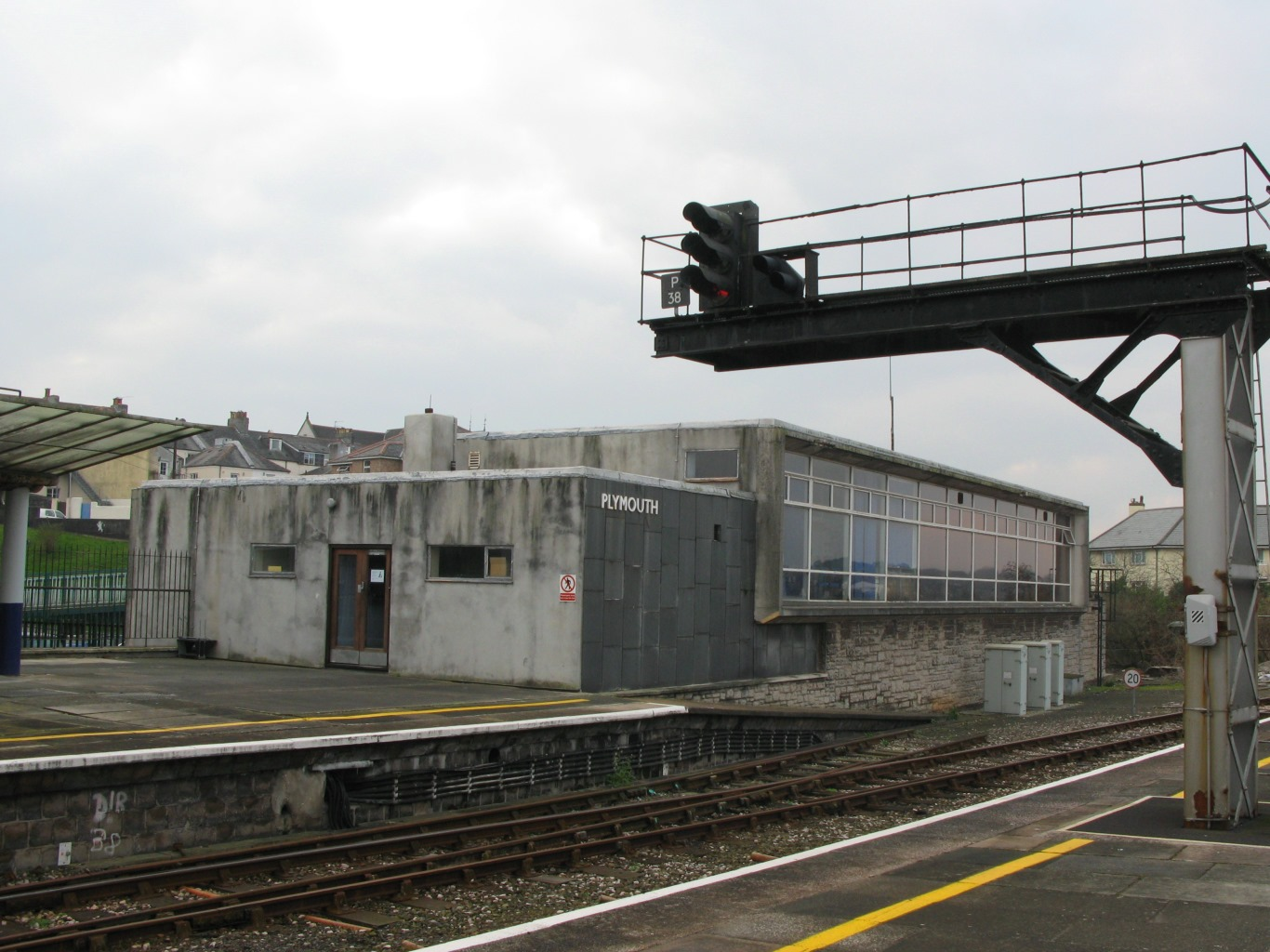
The signal box built in 1960

The station was originally controlled from two signal boxes. "North Road East" was on the north side of the line to the east of the station, while "North Road West" was on the south side of the line at the west end of the station where it could control the junction of the original lines to Millbay with the new Cornwall Loop Line to Devonport. The adjacent signal boxes were at Mutley to the east, Cornwall Junction on the Millbay line, and Devonport Junction at the far end of the Cornwall Loop.

Both of the North Road signal boxes were closed in November 1908 and replaced by new ones with the same names. The West box was now on the north side of the line and had 59 levers, while the East box needed just 48. They were each 38 feet (11.6 m) long. Mutley box closed at the same time, the next box now being at Mannamead on the other side of Mutley Tunnel, which had opened about three years earlier.

The rebuilding work of 1938 meant more signalling alterations. On 22 January 1938, the timber West box was lifted up and moved to a new position clear of the proposed works, being brought back into use on 27 January 1938. At the other end of the station the East box was closed and a new 79 feet (24.1 m) structure built, again on the north side of the line, which was brought into use on 25 June 1939.

Both signal boxes were closed on 26 November 1960 when a new "Plymouth Panel Signal Box" was opened on the west end of the new Platform 1; the West box was subsequently demolished. Multiple-aspect signals have controlled movements of trains throughout the Plymouth area since the opening of this new signal box in 1960. The adjacent boxes were initially at Laira Junction in the east and Keyham in the west. The area of control was extended westwards on 2 July 1973 to meet the signal box at St Germans, which closed in 1998 so the next signal box westwards is now at Liskeard railway station. Towards the end of 1973 several more signal boxes were closed eastwards from Plymouth, which meant that Plymouth controlled trains until they reached the outer signal of Totnes Signal Box. Totnes box closed on 9 November 1987 when a new panel signal box at Exeter was opened. The Panel Signal Box at the station controls all trains between (but not at) Totnes in Devon, and Liskeard in Cornwall.

== See also ==
- Railways in Plymouth

This station offers access to the South West Coast Path
Distance to path	1 mile (1.6 km)
Next station anticlockwise	Kingswear 65 miles (105 km)
Next station clockwise	Looe 21 miles (34 km)
