= Tamar Valley Line =

Railway line in Devon and Cornwall, England

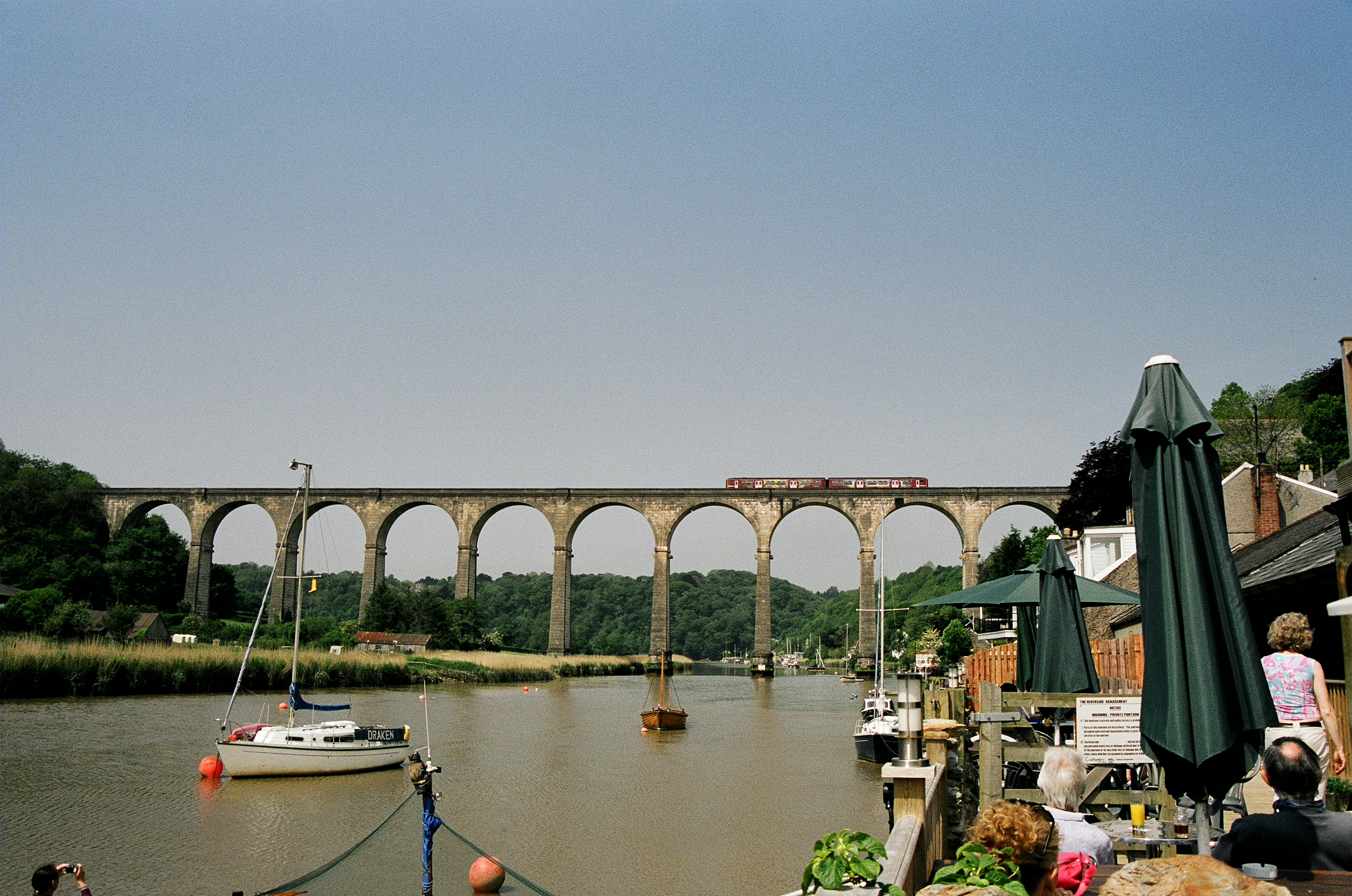
- Calstock viaduct

Overview
- Owner: Network Rail
- Locale: Devon and Cornwall
- Coordinates: 50.378°N 4.143°W; 50.516°N 4.220°W
- Termini: Plymouth; Gunnislake
- Stations: 9

Service
- Type: Community railway
- Operator: Great Western Railway

Technical
- Line length: 14 miles (23 km)
- Number of tracks: Single track throughout
- Track gauge: 1,435 mm (4 ft 8 1/2 in)
- Operating speed: 55 mph (89 km/h)
Route map
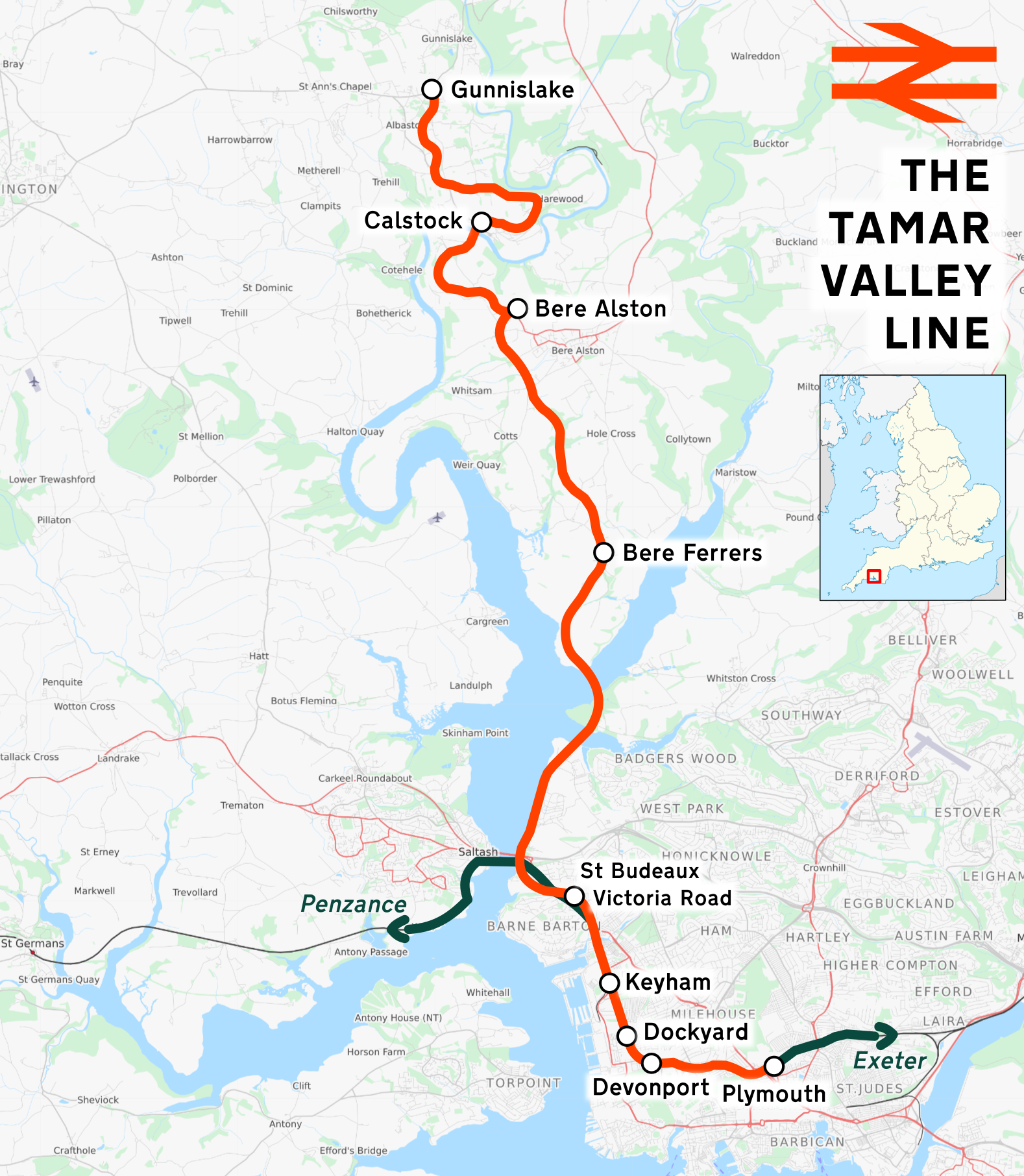
(Click to expand)

The Tamar Valley Line is a railway line from Plymouth, Devon, to Gunnislake, Cornwall, in England, also known as the Gunnislake branch line. The line follows the River Tamar for much of its route. Like all railway lines in Devon and Cornwall, it is unelectrified and all trains are diesel powered. The entire line is single track past St. Budeaux Junction.

== History ==
The line from St Budeaux to Bere Alston was opened for passenger traffic on 2 June 1890 by the Plymouth, Devonport and South Western Junction Railway (PDSWJ) as part of their line from Lydford to Devonport, which in effect was an extension of the London and South Western Railway's main line from London Waterloo station to Lydford. This enabbled the LSWR to reach Plymouth independently of the Great Western Railway. The branch to Gunnislake was opened by the PDSWJ on 2 March 1908.

The line was listed for closure in the Reshaping of British Railways Report but was kept open because the roads in the areas served were poor.

=== Motive power ===
The line used former LSWR O2 Class tank engines as the main form of motive power for many years but in the 1950s newer LMS Ivatt Class 2 2-6-2T engines took over. By 1964 steam had been ousted from the line and DMUs had taken over, working as two-car sets.

Today services are operated by Great Western Railway using Class 150 diesel multiple units.

== Route ==
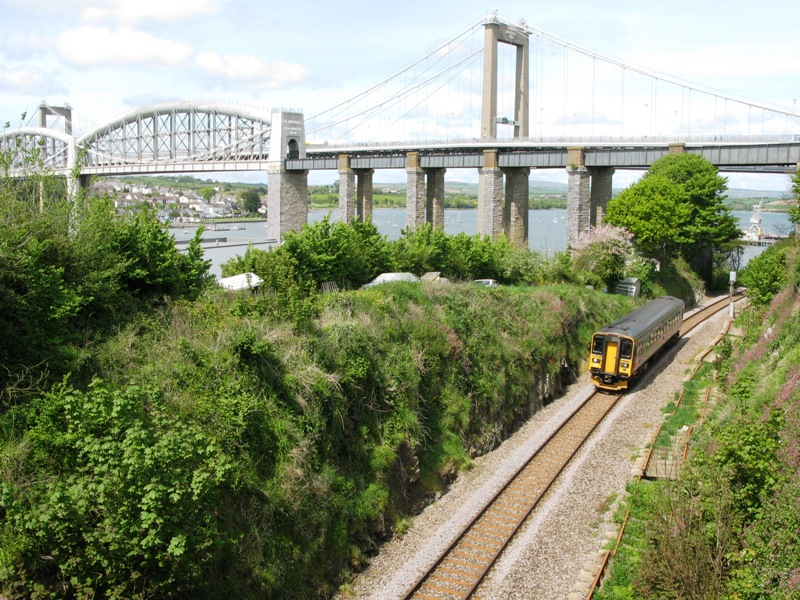
Passing under the Royal Albert and Tamar bridges at St Budeaux

Communities served: Plymouth (including the suburbs of Devonport and St Budeaux) – Bere Ferrers – Bere Alston – Calstock – Gunnislake

The entire route is supervised from the signalling centre at Plymouth. Trains heading towards Gunnislake must collect the branch train staff from a secure cabinet on the platform at St Budeaux Victoria Road before proceeding as the line is operated on the one train working system with only a single unit allowed on the branch at a time. Conversely the staff has to be returned to the cabinet by the driver on the return journey before the unit can leave the branch and return to Plymouth. This operation was shown in an episode of the Channel 5 documentary series "The Railway - First Great Western" in October 2013.

There is a small railway museum adjacent to Bere Ferrers railway station which includes a number of converted rail coaches available for holiday let. The station sign on the signal box uses the older spelling of 'Beer Ferrers'.

The section between Bere Ferrers and Calstock Viaduct is on the Bere peninsula, between river Tavy (crossed by the Tavy Bridge) and the river Tamar. The driver changes ends of the train at the old junction station of Bere Alston.

The most southerly road bridge across the Tamar in the Gunnislake area is the A390 road at Gunnislake Newbridge which means the railway is the quickest way of getting into the city of Plymouth. The next crossing down river is the Tamar Bridge at Saltash.

== Passenger volume ==
The overall number of passengers travelling on the Tamar Valley line has grown by over 50% since 2001. Gunnislake is the busiest station on the line.

Station usage
Station name	2002–03	2004–05	2005–06	2006–07	2007–08	2008–09	2009–10	2010–11	2011–12	2012–13	2013–14	2014–15	2015–16	2016–17	2017–18	2018–19	2019–20	2020–21	2021–22	2022–23	2023–24	2024–25
Devonport	18,795	16,202	18,573	19,655	17,450	21,652	21,674	27,006	27,756	29,878	31,866	33,368	39,742	41,404	45,492	39,464	43,046	16,150	30,866	34,970		
Dockyard	4,070	5,088	4,895	5,335	4,924	5,280	5,524	5,406	7,716	7,400	6,970	6,300	4,160	4,727	4,432	4,406	10,368	4,050	7,154	8,960		
Keyham	8,957	6,374	7,594	7,976	5,050	5,648	5,016	6,330	7,708	6,540	7,100	6,936	7,338	9,122	7,188	7,516	7,808	3,374	8,786	13,530		
St Budeaux Victoria Road	5,451	5,818	6,146	5,264	5,193	5,678	7,026	6,942	7,780	7,918	8,606	10,332	10,376	8,034	7,968	9,376	8,928	3,476	6,516	8,098		
Bere Ferrers	17,808	12,862	11,459	10,824	10,824	11,580	12,606	14,374	15,020	15,724	17,472	16,858	16,982	16,000	15,704	16,108	15,026	4,410	10,786	11,258		
Bere Alston	37,944	29,552	27,263	26,866	28,936	32,454	36,272	41,666	44,792	42,128	38,762	37,082	39,570	40,978	39,710	40,250	39,462	12,052	27,588	31,090		
Calstock	25,739	24,024	21,123	23,476	26,825	31,168	33,368	33,198	32,456	30,346	35,190	33,704	33,794	35,346	37,426	37,834	34,758	10,534	27,566	31,616		
Gunnislake	39,009	37,190	43,885	43,676	48,747	49,070	51,424	50,218	52,116	52,108	54,864	54,356	53,728	54,510	56,118	60,396	61,790	21,418	52,340	50,572		
Total	157,743	137,110	140,938	143,072	147,949	162,530	172,910	185,140	195,344	192,042	195,430	198,936	205,690	210,121	214,038	215,350	221,186					
The annual passenger usage is based on sales of tickets in stated financial years from Office of Rail and Road estimates of station usage. The statistics are for passengers arriving and departing from each station and cover twelve-month periods that start in April. Methodology may vary year on year. Usage since the period 2019–20 have been affected by the COVID-19 pandemic, especially the period 2020–23.

== Community rail ==
The Tamar Valley Line is one of the railway lines supported by the Devon and Cornwall Rail Partnership, an organisation formed in 1991 to promote railway services in the area. The line is promoted by many means such as regular timetable and scenic line guides, as well as leaflets highlighting leisure opportunities such as walking or visiting country pubs. The Tamar Valley rail ale trail was launched in 2004 to encourage rail travellers to visit pubs near the line. Seven are in Plymouth city centre and one in the suburb of Devonport. There are single pubs to visit at Bere Ferrers, Bere Alston and Calstock and four in Gunnislake. 10 stamps collected entitle the participant to claim special Tamar Valley Line Rail Trail souvenir merchandise.

Wessex Trains covered Class 150 2-car DMU number 150240 in coloured pictures promoting the line and named The Tamar Kingfisher.

The line was designated as a community rail line in September 2005, being one of seven pilots for the Department for Transport's Community Rail Development Strategy. This aims to establish the true costs and revenues for the line with an aim of improving them. It is also looking at simplifying the reversal of trains, considering the costs and benefits should the line be "microfranchised" separately from the Great Western Franchise, and the potential for extending the line from Bere Alston to Tavistock.

On 18 March 2008, Devon County Council backed a proposal by developers Kilbride Community Rail to construct 750 houses in Tavistock that includes reopening the 5.5-mile (9 km) line from Bere Alston to a new Tavistock railway station, at a cost of £18.5million.
