= Gunnislake railway station =

Railway station in Cornwall, England

Gunnislake Dowrgonna
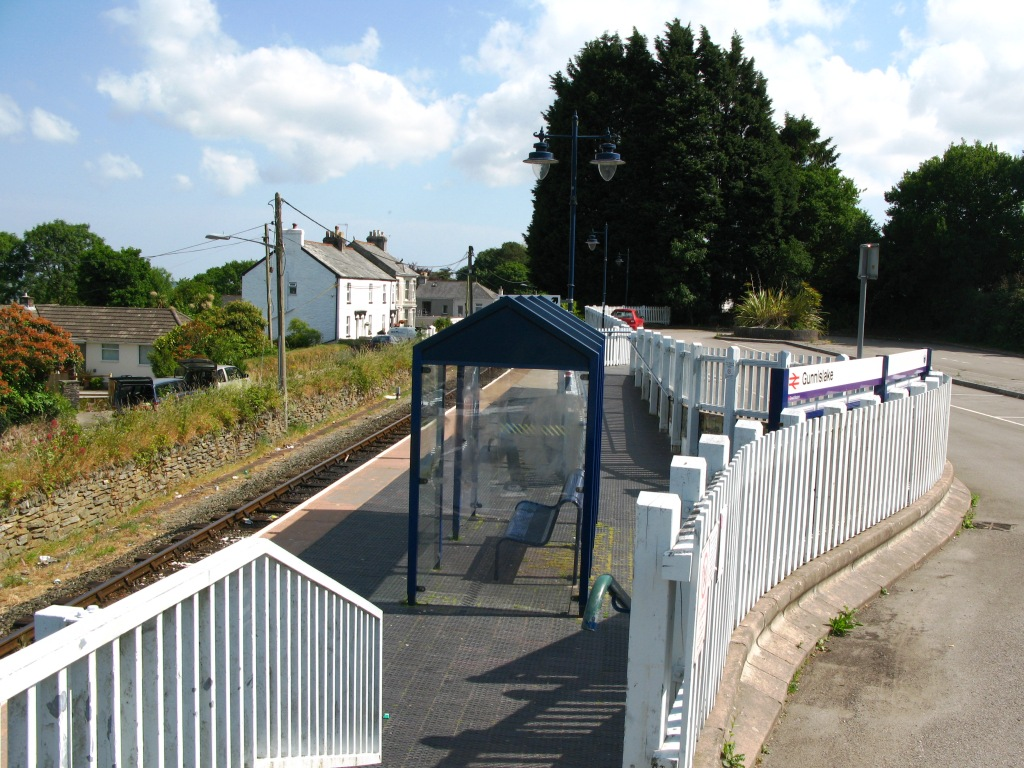

General information
- Location: Gunnislake, Cornwall; England
- Coordinates: 50.516°N 4.220°W
- Grid reference: SX427708
- Manager: Great Western Railway
- Platforms: 1

Other information
- Station code: GSL
- Classification: DfT category F1

Key dates
- 1908: opened
- 1994: resited

Passengers
- 2021/22: ▲52,340
- 2022/23: ▼50,572
- 2023/24: ▲53,184
- 2024/25: ▼50,302
- 2025/26: ▲52,904
Location
Notes
- Passenger statistics from the Office of Rail and Road

Gunnislake railway station (Cornish: Dowrgonna) serves the village of Gunnislake in Cornwall, England. There are also connecting buses from here to the town of Tavistock. However the station is located in or nearer to the villages of Drakewalls and Albaston. It is the northern terminus of the Tamar Valley Line from Plymouth.

== History ==
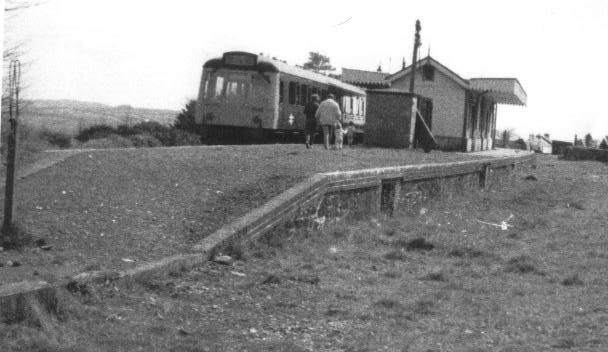
A view of the station in 1972.

The 3 ft 6 in (1,067 mm) gauge East Cornwall Mineral Railway was opened from the quay at Calstock to Kelly Bray on 8 May 1872. It was replaced by the present Plymouth, Devonport and South Western Junction Railway route across Calstock Viaduct on 2 March 1908 which saw passenger trains introduced.

Gunnislake became a terminus on 7 November 1966, the line onwards to Callington having closed the previous Saturday. The original station was on the west side of the road bridge but in 1994 it was replaced by a new station on the east (Calstock) side which has allowed the low 12-foot (3.7 m) bridge to be demolished.

Preceding station	Disused railways	Following station
Kelly Bray; Line and station closed	East Cornwall Mineral Railway; 1872–1894	Calstock Quay; Line closed
Chilsworthy; Line and station closed	Plymouth, Devonport and South Western Junction Railway; Callington Branch 1894–1966	Calstock

== Facilities ==
The station car park and bus interchange is situated immediately behind the platform. There are no ticket buying facilities, so passengers have to buy a ticket in advance or from the guard on the train. There is a help point, and timetable and information boards, on the platform, as well as a waiting shelter.

== Services ==
The journey from Plymouth typically takes 45 minutes. During the summer nine trains each way operate on weekdays, eight on Saturdays and six on Sundays. Connections with main line services can be made at Plymouth.

Preceding station	National Rail	Following station
Terminus	Great Western Railway Tamar Valley Line	Calstock towards Plymouth

== Community Rail ==
The railway from Plymouth to Gunnislake is designated as a community railway and is supported by marketing provided by the Devon and Cornwall Rail Partnership. The line is promoted as the "Tamar Valley Line".

== Bibliography ==
- Cheesman, AJ (1967). The Plymouth, Devonport and South Western Junction Railway. Blandford Forum: Oakwood Press.
- Clinker, CR (1963). The Railways of Cornwall 1809 - 1963. Dawlish: David and Charles.
- Crombleholme, Roger; Gibson, Bryan; Stickey, Douglas; Whetmath, CFD (1985) [1967]. Callington Railways. Bracknell: Forge Books. ISBN 0904662233.
