= Great Western Railway accidents =

Great Western Railway
- Logo of the Great Western Railway, incorporating the shields, crests and mottoes of the cities of London (left) and Bristol (right)

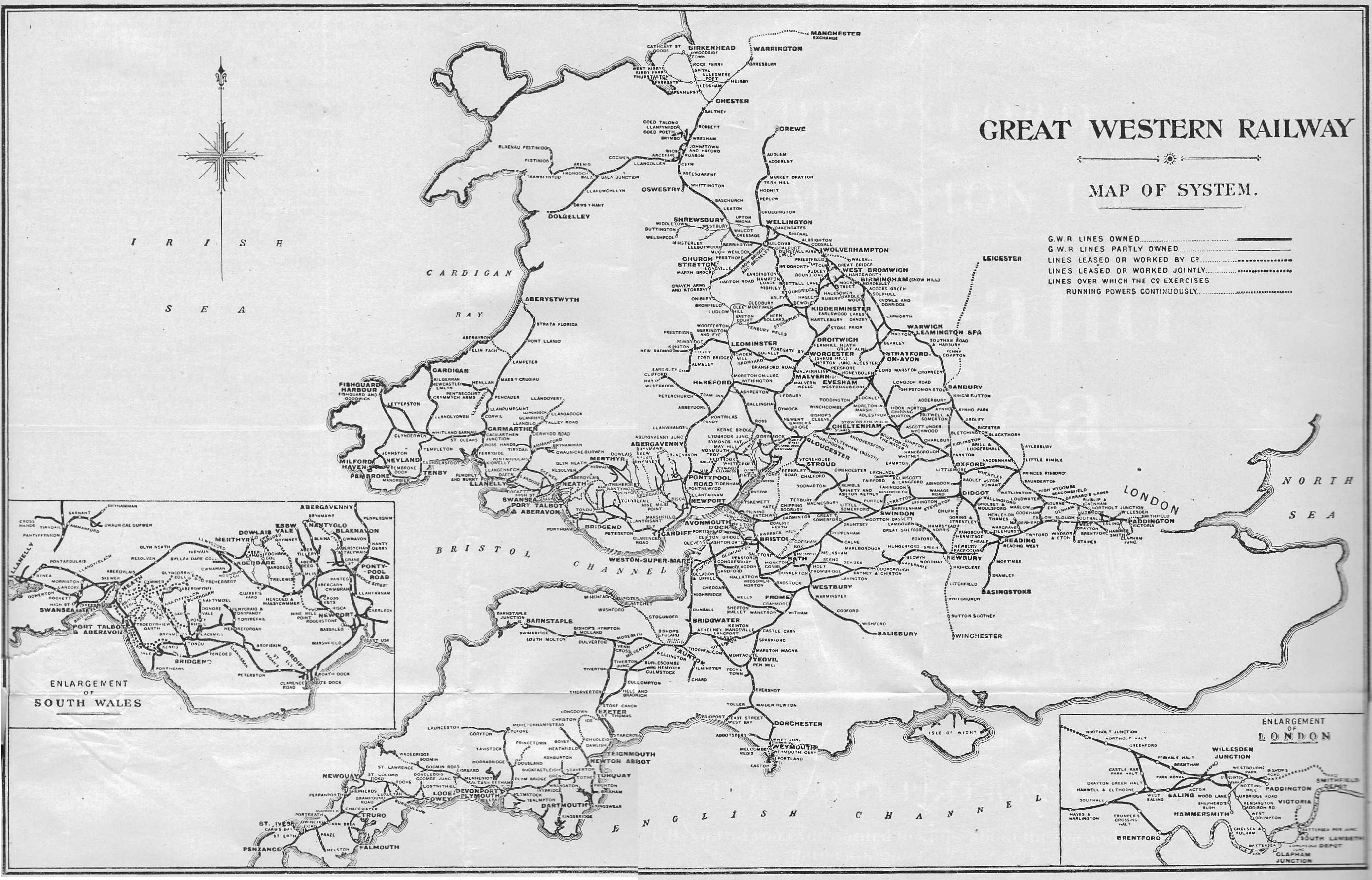
- Map of the railway pre-grouping (1920)

- Map of the railway post-grouping (1926)

History
- 1835: Act of incorporation
- 1838: First train ran
- 1869–92: 7 ft 1/4 in (2,140 mm) Brunel gauge changed to 4 ft 8 1/2 in (1,435 mm) standard gauge
- 1903: Start of road motor services
- 1923: Keeps identity though the Grouping
- 1935: Centenary
- 1948: Nationalised

Successor organisation
- 1948: British Rail, Western Region
Constituent companies
See full list of constituents of the GWR
1854	Shrewsbury and Birmingham Railway; Shrewsbury and Chester Railway
1862	South Wales Railway
1863	West Midland Railway
1876	Bristol and Exeter Railway; South Devon Railway
1889	Cornwall Railway
1922	Rhymney Railway; Taff Vale Railway; Cambrian Railways
1923	Midland & S W Junction Railway

Key locations
- Headquarters: Paddington station, London
- Locale: England; Wales
- Workshops: Swindon; Wolverhampton
- Major stations: Birmingham Snow Hill; Bristol Temple Meads; Cardiff General; London Paddington; Reading General
Route mileage
Mileage shown as at end of year stated
1841	171 miles (275 km)
1863	1,106 miles (1,780 km)
1876	2,023 miles (3,256 km)
1899	2,504 miles (4,030 km)
1919	2,996 miles 68 chains (4,823.0 km)
1921	3,005 miles (4,836 km)
1924	3,797 miles (6,111 km)
1925	3,819 miles 69 chains (6,147.5 km)

Great Western Railway accidents include several notable incidents that influenced rail safety in the United Kingdom.

== Notable accidents ==
=== Sonning ===
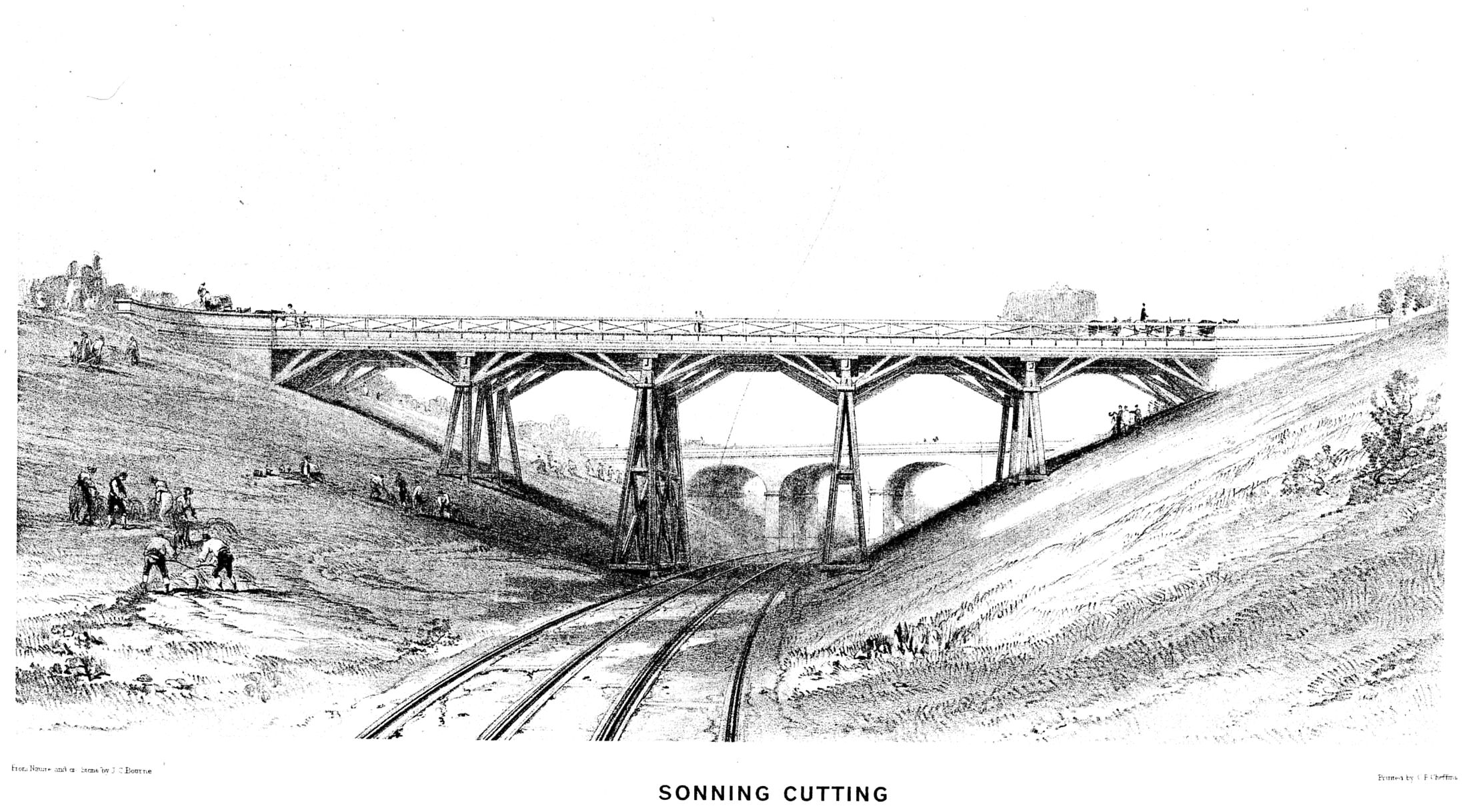
JC Bourne print of Sonning Cutting in 1846, close to the scene of the 1842 accident.

In common with other railway companies, the GWR experienced accidents throughout its history, one of the most serious being the Sonning Cutting accident in December 1842. Nine workmen were killed when their train hit a landslip. The accident occurred in the early hours of 24 December 1841 in the Sonning Cutting, near Reading, in Berkshire, as a mixed passenger/goods train travelling from London Paddington to Bristol entered the cutting. The train comprised the Leo class broad-gauge locomotive Hecla and its tender, three third-class passenger waggons and some heavily laden goods waggons. The passenger waggons were between the tender and the goods waggons. Recent heavy rain had saturated the soil in the cutting causing it to slip, covering the line on which the train was travelling. On running into the slipped soil the engine was derailed, and the passenger waggons were crushed between the goods waggons and the tender. Eight passengers died at the scene and seventeen were injured. In the ensuing investigation, the company was criticised not for the landslip (the civil engineering was deemed adequate) but for the inadequate state of the third class open wagon coaches, which failed to protect the passengers either from the weather or from being thrown out when the accident occurred.

The accident had important repercussions because it led to the Railway Regulation Act 1844. William Ewart Gladstone introduced his bill to regulate the way passengers were transported, such as protection of third-class passengers, and to introduce much greater government control of the growing network. The Act established the Parliamentary train with fares limited by statute.

=== Shipton ===
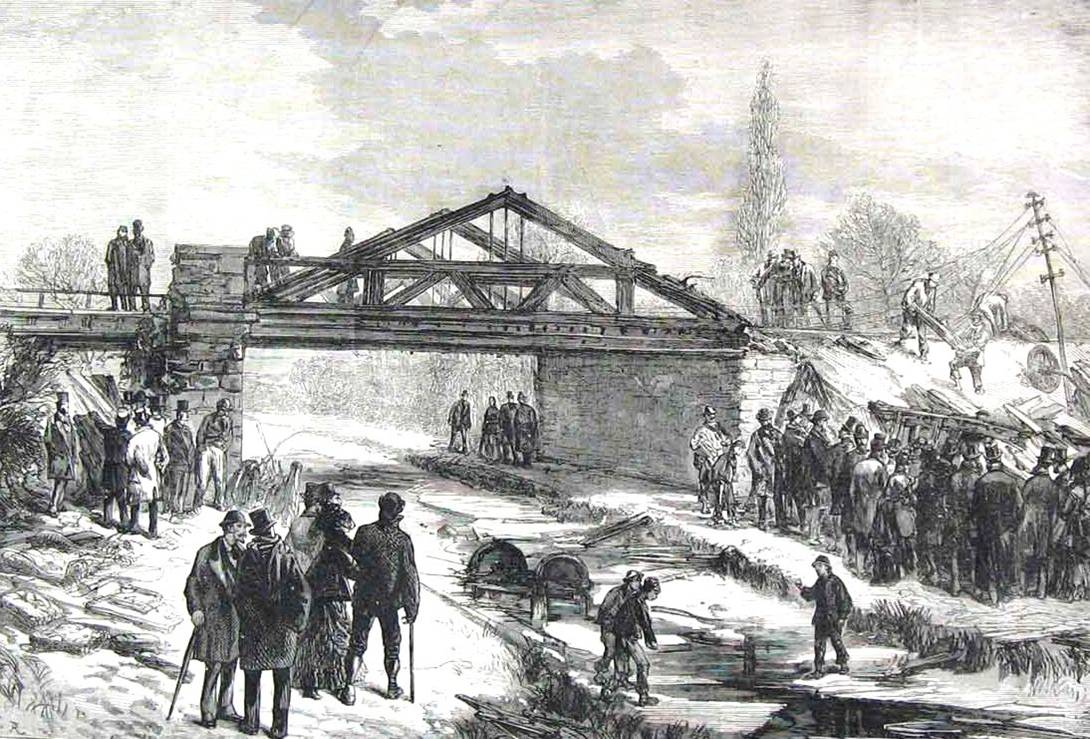
Shipton-on-Cherwell train crash, Christmas Eve 1874

The most serious accident however, occurred on 24 December 1874, when a double-headed passenger train from Paddington to Birkenhead derailed near Kidlington just north of Oxford and 34 passengers were killed. The Shipton-on-Cherwell train crash was caused by the fracture of a single wheel on an old carriage just behind the locomotive's tender. The carriage continued upright until the drivers saw what had happened and applied the brakes. The following carriages crushed the old waggon and it was thrown off the track, with the rest of the train behind. The locomotives travelled some distance before the drivers realised what had happened and returned to help rescue efforts.

The investigation which followed was led by William Yolland and established the root causes very quickly. The tyre was on an old carriage, and was of an obsolete design. The fracture started at a rivet hole, possibly by metal fatigue, although it was not recognised as such by the inquiry. The weather was very cold that day, with snow blanketing the fields and very low freezing temperatures, another factor which hastened the tyre failure. The disaster led to a re-appraisal of braking methods and systems, and the eventual adoption of continuous automatic brakes being fitted to trains, based either on the Westinghouse air brake or a vacuum brake. The Railway Inspectorate recommended Mansell wheels, a type of wooden composite wheel, be adopted by the railway companies since the design had a better safety record than the alternatives. There had been a long history of failed wheels involved in serious accidents, especially in the previous decade. They were also critical of the communication method between the locomotive and the rest of the train using an external cord and gong, suggesting that a telegraphic method be adopted instead.

== List of Great Western Railway accidents ==
This list includes notable accidents on railways that were later amalgamated with the Great Western Railway.

- Sonning Cutting, 24 December 1841 – 10 killed, 17 injured: train ran into landslide caused by heavy rain.
- On 24 May 1847, GWR Prince Class locomotive Queen was nearing Southall with an up express from Exeter when one of the 7' driving wheel tyres broke. A fragment killed two drovers on a passing down train, which was derailed by another fragment. Remarkably, the express continued over Wharncliffe Viaduct to stop at Hanwell, then continued to Paddington without the tyre.
- On 10 May 1848, at Shrivenham, the up express headed by Iron Duke class Sultan collided with a horse box and cattle van that had been temporarily shunted onto the running line. Although the locomotive continued without derailment, the two wagons were thrown onto the platform, rebounded, and tore into the side of the leading coach of the express. Six passengers died, and thirteen were injured.
- On 27 June 1849, the boiler of Hercules class locomotive Goliah exploded whilst it was hauling a freight train at Plympton on the South Devon Railway. One person was killed.
- In 1850, an excursion train collided with a horsebox at Wootton Bassett, Wiltshire. Following this accident, trap points and scotch blocks are provided at all sidings leading onto running lines.
- On 20 October 1850, the special train celebrating the opening of the GWR broad gauge route to Birmingham, drawn by Iron Duke class Lord of the Isles and driven by Daniel Gooch, the GWR's locomotive engineer, crashed into a stationary mixed train at Aynho. Due to the stability of the broad gauge, neither train derailed, and only six injuries were reported (all in the stationary train). Lord of the Isles was unable to proceed, so the engine of the mixed train pulled the special to Banbury; it never reached Birmingham.
- On 28 November 1852, a passenger train was derailed at Gatcombe, Gloucestershire.
- Grove viaduct, 6 May 1859 – just two days after the opening of the Cornwall Railway a train was derailed near St Germans and fell off a viaduct killing three of the train crew.
- On 28 June 1865, a ballast train derailed at Bruton, Somerset. The driver and fireman were killed.
- On 5 November 1868, 4-4-0 locomotive Rob Roy was in a rear-end collision with a cattle train at Awse Junction, near Newnham, Gloucestershire.
- Menheniot, 2 December 1873 (Cornwall Railway) – head-on collision on single line; no casualties: misunderstood signalman's verbal order.
- Shipton-on-Cherwell, 24 December 1874; 34 killed, 69 injured: carriage tyre broke, derailed train on bridge over canal.
- On 16 February 1880, a freight train was derailed when it ran into a large rock that had fallen onto the line 1.5 nautical miles (2.8 km) south of Chepstow, Monmouthshire.
- On 12 November 1890, A boat train was in collision with a freight train at Norton Fitzwarren, Somerset due to errors by the guard of the freight train and the signalman. Ten people were killed and nine were injured.
- On 8 March 1891, the locomotive of a relief passenger train was derailed near Camborne, Cornwall in blizzard conditions.
- On 12 November 1894, a passenger train was derailed at Yetminster, Dorset when the track was damaged by flooding.
- On 13 April 1895, A double-headed passenger train derailed between Doublebois and Bodmin Road, Cornwall due to damaged track.
- Menheniot, 9 February 1897 – reconstruction of Coldrennick Viaduct: workman's platform fell: 12 killed.
- Menheniot, 15 November 1897 – reconstruction of Trevido Viaduct: accident raising a heavy timber: 2 killed.
- In 1898, a mail train was derailed near Penryn, Cornwall due to defective track and the oscillation of the locomotive hauling it. Following this accident, the 3521 Class locomotives were rebuilt as tender locomotives.

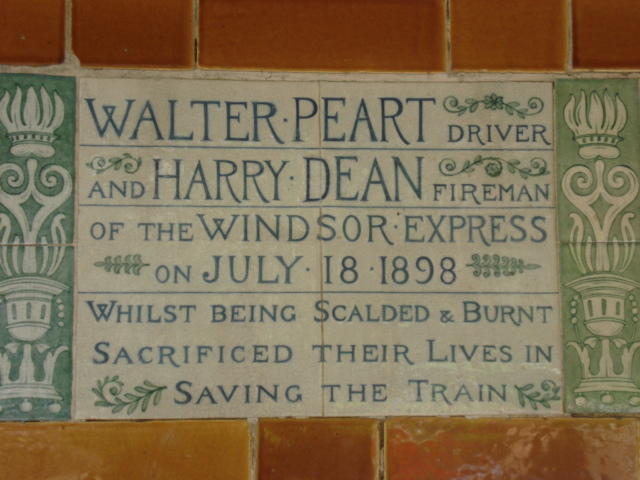

- In 1898 Walter Peart and Henry Dean were the driver and fireman of the Great Western train known as the Windsor Express. On 18 July 1898, they were driving the 4:15 train from Windsor to Paddington when, just outside Acton, the connecting rod broke. Part of it was driven through the boiler casing and caused damage to the firebox which overwhelmed the men with cinders, steam and fire. They succeeded in applying the brake and bringing the train to a safe standstill before leaving the engine at Acton station.
- On 16 June 1900, an express passenger train overran signals and crashed into the rear of a passenger train at Slough, Berkshire. Five people were killed and 35 were injured.
- In 1904, an express passenger train was derailed at Loughor, Glamorgan due to excessive speed. Five people were killed and eighteen were injured.
- Thingley Junction, 16 January 1907 – Signal passed at danger: 0 killed, 12 injured.
- On 8 August 1913, a train overran signals and was in a rear-end collision with a passenger train at Yeovil Pen Mill station, Somerset. Two people were killed.
- On 17 June 1914, an excursion train departed from Reading station, Berkshire against signals. An express passenger train was in a sidelong collision with it, killing one person.
- On 23 April 1915, 14 men were riding a partly loaded, low-sided wagon which was loose-shunted onto a siding at Totnes railway station. The screw brakes were applied under the direction of ganger JJ King, however, due to a brake failure, the wagon hit the buffers injuring 8 of the 14 men riding.
- On 20 April 1917, GWR employee, James Lovejoy, was knocked down and killed by the 9.05 pm Llangollen Branch goods train at Pontypool Road.
- On 3 January 1925, a freight train was derailed at Tir-Phil, Glamorgan when the trackbed was washed away.
- On 4 March 1933, a passenger train was struck by falling rocks at Vriog, Merionethshire. The locomotive and its tender were pushed into the Irish Sea, killing both crew.
- On 19 December 1933, former CME George Jackson Churchward, was struck and killed by the Fishguard express hauled by 4085 Berkley Castle.
- On 15 January 1936, a freight train became divided near Shrivenham, Berkshire. Due to errors by its guard and a signalman, an express passenger train crashed into the six wagons that had been left behind. Two people were killed.
- On 1 March 1937, a passenger train was in collision with a freight train at Langley, Buckinghamshire. One person was killed and six people were injured.
- On 16 November 1937, a steam railcar overran signals and crashed into the signal box at Ealing Broadway, Middlesex.
- On 19 August 1938, a passenger train was sent into a siding at Newport High Street station, Monmouthshire due to a signalman's error. Three people were injured.
- Norton Fitzwarren, 4 November 1940 – 27 killed: driver misunderstood signal layout, drove off track.
- On 2 July 1941, an express passenger train and a freight train were in a head-on collision at Slough, Berkshire. Five people were killed and 21 were injured.

== See also ==
- List of British rail accidents by death toll
