= The Man (disambiguation) =

The Man is a slang phrase, used to refer to a generalized idea of authority.

The Man may also refer to:

== Literature ==
- The Man (Stoker novel), a 1905 novel by Bram Stoker
- The Man (Wallace novel), a 1964 novel by Irving Wallace
- The Man (comics) (1992), a graphic novel by Raymond Briggs
- "The Man", a 1951 short story in The Illustrated Man by Ray Bradbury

== Music ==
- The Man (Barry White album), 1978
- The Man (Bill Drummond album), 1986
- The Man (Sponge album), 2005
- The Man (Lorne Greene album), 1965
- The Man!, album by Leroy Hutson

=== Songs ===
- "The Man" (Aloe Blacc song), 2014
- "The Man" (Ed Sheeran song), 2014
- "The Man" (The Killers song), 2017
- "The Man" (Taylor Swift song), 2019
- "The Man", a song by Patto from their 1970 album Patto
- "The Man", a duet between Paul McCartney and Michael Jackson from McCartney's 1983 album Pipes of Peace
- "The Man", a semi-instrumental by Space from their 1998 album Tin Planet
- "The Man", a song by Eels from their 2010 album Tomorrow Morning
- "The Man", a 2018 song by Goat Girl

== Films ==
- The Man (1972 film), starring James Earl Jones, based upon Irving Wallace's novel
- The Man (2005 film), starring Samuel L. Jackson and Eugene Levy

== Television ==
- "The Man", a 2019 episode of One Day at a Time
- "The Man", a 2014 episode of The Amazing World of Gumball
- Irina Derevko, a character in the 2001–2006 series Alias, played by Lena Olin
- Ed Brown, eponymous character in the 1974–1978 series Chico and the Man, played by Jack Albertson

== People ==
- Stan Musial (1920–2013), professional baseball player nicknamed "Stan the Man"
- Stan Lee (1922–2018), legendary comic book creator nicknamed "Stan the Man"
- Ric Flair (born 1949), retired American professional wrestler whose catchphrases included, "To be 'the man', you gotta beat the man!"
- The Man, a later stage name used briefly by former American professional wrestler Big Boss Man (Ray Traylor, 1963–2004)
- Anthony Mundine (born 1975), Australian boxer and former rugby player nicknamed "The Man"
- Becky Lynch (born 1987), Irish professional wrestler nicknamed "The Man"
- Van Morrison, Irish musician nicknamed "Van The Man”

== See also ==
- Man (disambiguation)
- Men (disambiguation)
- I'm the Man (disambiguation)
- Stan the Man (nickname)
- The Men (disambiguation)
- This Man (disambiguation)
- That Man (disambiguation)
