= This Man (disambiguation) =

This Man is best known as an urban legend.

This Man may also refer to:

== Music ==
=== Records ===
- This Man (album), 2015 album by Cory Marks
- This Man (single album), 2024 single album by Jeonghan X Wonwoo based on the urban legend

=== Songs ===
- "This Man" (song), 2004 song by Jeremy Camp, a single off the album Restored
- "This Man", 1995 song by Burning Spear from the album Rasta Business
- "This Man", song from Chaplin (2006 musical)
- "This Man", 2014 song by Cory Marks, the title track off the eponymous album This Man (album)
- "This Man", 2020 song by Robert Cray from the album That's What I Heard

== Other uses ==
- This Man (film), a 2024 Japanese horror film based on the 'This Man' urban legend

== See also ==
- The Man (disambiguation)
- That Man (disambiguation)
- These Men
- This (disambiguation)
- Man (disambiguation)
