= That Man =

That Man may refer to:

- "That Man" (song), a 2010 song by Caro Emerald
- That Man, an Excel Saga character
- That Man, a Guilty Gear character
- That Man in the White House, used to describe Franklin D. Roosevelt

== See also ==
- The Man (disambiguation)
- That
- Man (disambiguation)
- This Man (disambiguation)
- These Men
