= Men (disambiguation) =

Men is the plural of man, an adult male human being.

Men or MEN may also refer to:

== People ==
- Men (name), list of people with either a given name or surname "Men"
- Ordinary soldiers, as distinct from Officer (armed forces) grades

== Arts and entertainment ==
=== Films ===
- Men (1924 film), a silent drama starring Pola Negri
- Men (2022 film), a folk horror starring Jessie Buckley and Rory Kinnear
- Men..., a 1985 West German comedy directed by Doris Dörrie

=== Music ===
- MEN (band), a Brooklyn-based art-performance collective
- "Men" (The Forester Sisters song), 1991
- "Men" (Charly McClain song), 1980

=== Periodicals ===
- Manchester Evening News, a regional daily newspaper in North West England
- Men (magazine), a gay pornographic magazine

=== Other media ===
- Man (Middle-earth), a race of mortals in J. R. R. Tolkien's Middle-earth legendarium
- Men (kendo), one of the five strikes in kendo
- Men (TV series), a 1989 American television series
- Men.com, a gay pornographic website

== Astronomy ==
- Mensa (constellation), a constellation in the southern sky (by IAU abbreviation)
- Chinese for the star Alpha Lupi

== Religion ==
- Men (deity), an ancient Phrygian god
- Men. - abbreviation for the tractate Menachot (Hebrew: מְנָחוֹת; "Meal Offerings") the second tractate of the Order of Kodashim.

== Other uses ==
- Menheniot railway station, Cornwall, England (GBR code: MEN)
- Menorca, IIGA code
- Mentone railway station, Melbourne
- Ministry of National Education (Madagascar), Le Ministre de l’Éducation Nationale
- Ministry of National Education (Poland)
- Multiple endocrine neoplasia, a medical condition with tumors of endocrine glands
- Men (Armenian letter), part of the Armenian alphabet

== See also ==
- Man (disambiguation)
- Mans (disambiguation)
- The Men (disambiguation)
