= I'm a Man =

I'm a Man may refer to:

== Film ==
- I'm a Man (film), a 1918 film directed by King Vidor

== Songs ==
- "I'm a Man" (Bo Diddley song) (1955), performed by Bo Diddley and covered by The Yardbirds
- "I'm a Man", a song written by Mort Shuman and Doc Pomus and performed by Fabian (1958)
- "I'm a Man" (The Spencer Davis Group song) (1967), performed by the Spencer Davis Group and covered by the band Chicago
- "I'm a Man", a 1998 song by Pulp from the album This Is Hardcore
- "I'm a Man" (Michelle Branch song), 2022

== See also ==
- I Am a Man!
- I'm the Man
