= The Men =

The Men may refer to:

== Film and TV ==
- The Men (1950 film), a 1950 film directed by Fred Zinnemann
- The Men (1971 film), a 1971 film directed by Gilles Carle
- The Men (TV series), a US television series

== Art ==
- The Men (statue), a public artwork in Yerevan, Armenia

== Music ==
- The Men, an alias used by English band The Human League for 1979 release "I Don't Depend on You"
- The Men (pop rock band), a defunct American band from Santa Monica, California 1990s, or their 1992 self-titled album
- The Men (punk band), an active American punk rock band from Brooklyn, New York
- MEN (band), an unrelated electropop band also from Brooklyn, New York

== See also ==
- Men (disambiguation)
- Man (disambiguation)
- The Man (disambiguation)
- These Men
