= I'm the Man =

I'm the Man may refer to:

- I'm the Man (EP), a 1987 EP by Anthrax
- I'm the Man (Joe Jackson album), 1979
  - "I'm the Man" (Joe Jackson song), 1979
- I'm the Man (Sherman Robertson album), 1994
- "I'm the Man" (50 Cent song), 2015
- "I'm the Man", song by Adéla from Prima, 2026

== See also ==
- The Man (disambiguation)
- I'm a Man
