= Stan the Man (nickname) =

Stan the Man is a nickname that predominantly refers to Stan Musial (1920–2013), an American baseball player.

It is also a nickname of:

- Stan Lee (1922–2018), president and chairman of Marvel Comics
- Stan Longinidis (born 1965), Australian kickboxer
- Stan "The Man" Rofe (1933–2003), Australian radio disc jockey
- Stan Stasiak (1937–1997), American former professional wrestler
- Stan Collymore (born 1971), English footballer
- Stan Wawrinka (born 1985), Swiss tennis player
- Konstantin Stanislavski (1863–1938), Russian former actor and director
- Stiliyan Petrov (born 1979), Bulgarian footballer

== Entertainment ==
- Stan the Man, an animated short on Cartoon Network

== See also ==
- Don Stanhouse (born 1951), aka "Stan the Man Unusual", American baseball player
- Stan "The Man" Turrentine, the debut album by jazz saxophonist Stanley Turrentine
