= St Germans railway station =

Railway station in Cornwall, England

St Germans Lannaled
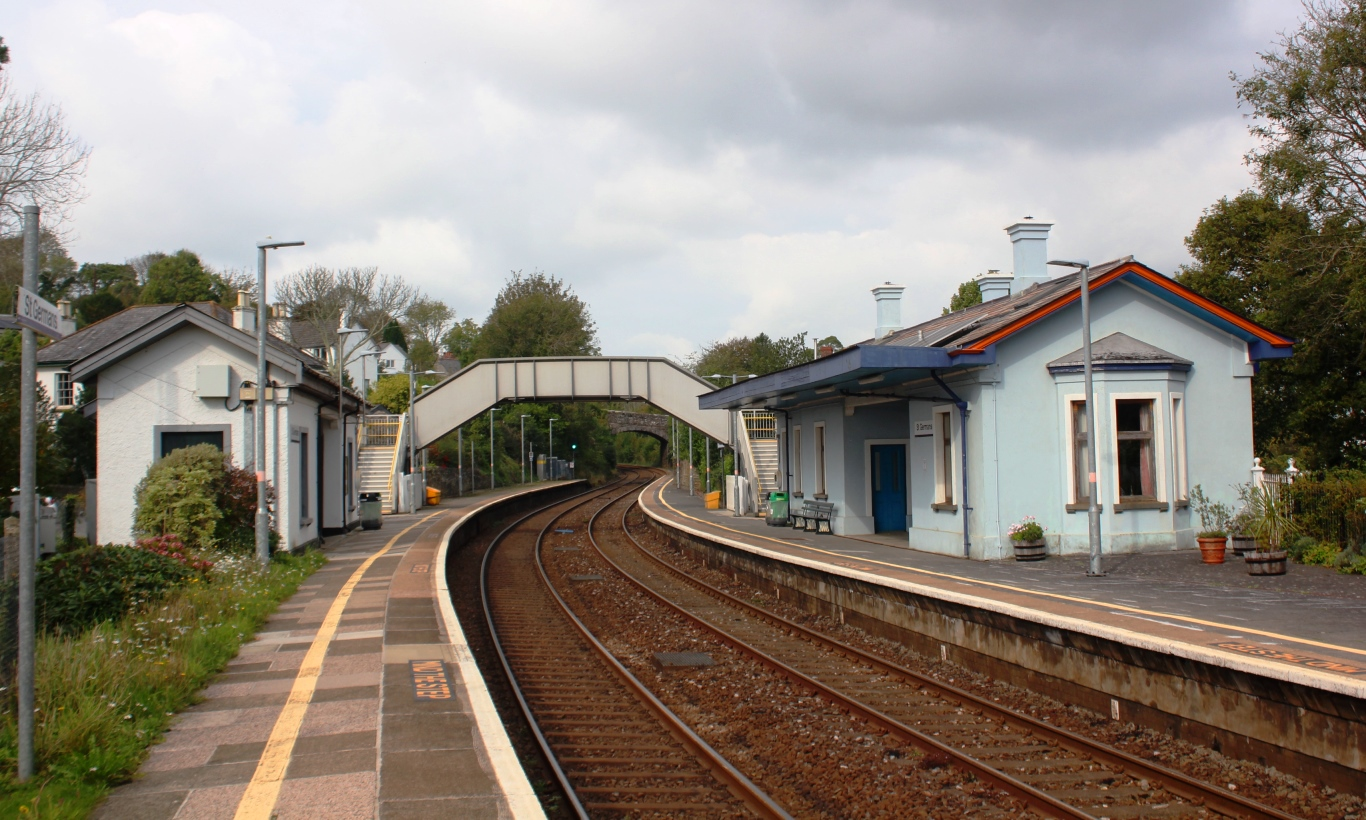

General information
- Location: St Germans, Cornwall; England
- Coordinates: 50.394°N 4.309°W
- Grid reference: SX360574
- Managed by: Great Western Railway
- Platforms: 2

Other information
- Station code: SGM
- Classification: DfT category F2

History
- Original company: Cornwall Railway
- Pre-grouping: Great Western Railway
- Post-grouping: Great Western Railway

Key dates
- Opened: 1859

Passengers
- 2020/21: ▼17,770
- 2021/22: ▲54,130
- 2022/23: ▲64,782
- 2023/24: ▲67,330
- 2024/25: ▲75,942
Location
Notes
- Passenger statistics from the Office of Rail and Road

St Germans railway station (Cornish: Lannaled) serves the village of St Germans in Cornwall, England. The station is managed by Great Western Railway and is situated on the Cornish Main Line 10 miles 33 chains (16.8 km) from the line's northern terminus of Plymouth and 256 miles 28 chains (412.6 km) from London Paddington via Box and Plymouth Millbay. To the east of the station, the thirteen arch stone viaduct of 1908 (which replaced the original timber one built in 1859) takes the railway over the River Tiddy.

== History ==
The station opened with the Cornwall Railway on 4 May 1859. It was described at the time as

"of ornamental design ... conveniently situated close to the town, and consists of arrival, departure, and goods stations, all three being constructed of stone".

The Cornwall Railway was amalgamated into the Great Western Railway on 1 July 1889. On 1 January 1948, the Great Western Railway was nationalised, amalgamating with other railways to form British Rail, which was privatised in the 1990s.

In 1973, a signal panel was located in the old station buildings on the platform served by trains to Penzance, although this has since closed. The other building has been private accommodation since 1992; a number of camping coaches in the old sidings are available to let.

=== Accidents and incidents ===
A fatal accident occurred near St Germans just two days after the opening of the railway. On 6 May 1859, the 7.25 p.m. train from Plymouth was approaching St Germans when the engine left the rails, hit the parapet of the wooden viaduct across Grove Creek and fell 38 feet into the mud below, landing upside down; two of the coaches also ended up in the creek. The driver, fireman, and one of the guards were killed. A second guard, Richard Paddon, was given a reward of five pounds (equivalent to £633 in 2023) for his part in keeping the remainder of the train on the viaduct and helping to rescue the survivors.

== Facilities ==
Both platforms have step-free entrances (though the footbridge linking them has steps) and basic facilities - waiting shelters, bike racks and bench seats on each side. Running information is provided by timetable posters and a public telephone. No ticket machine is available, so passengers must buy tickets prior to travel or on the train.

== Services ==
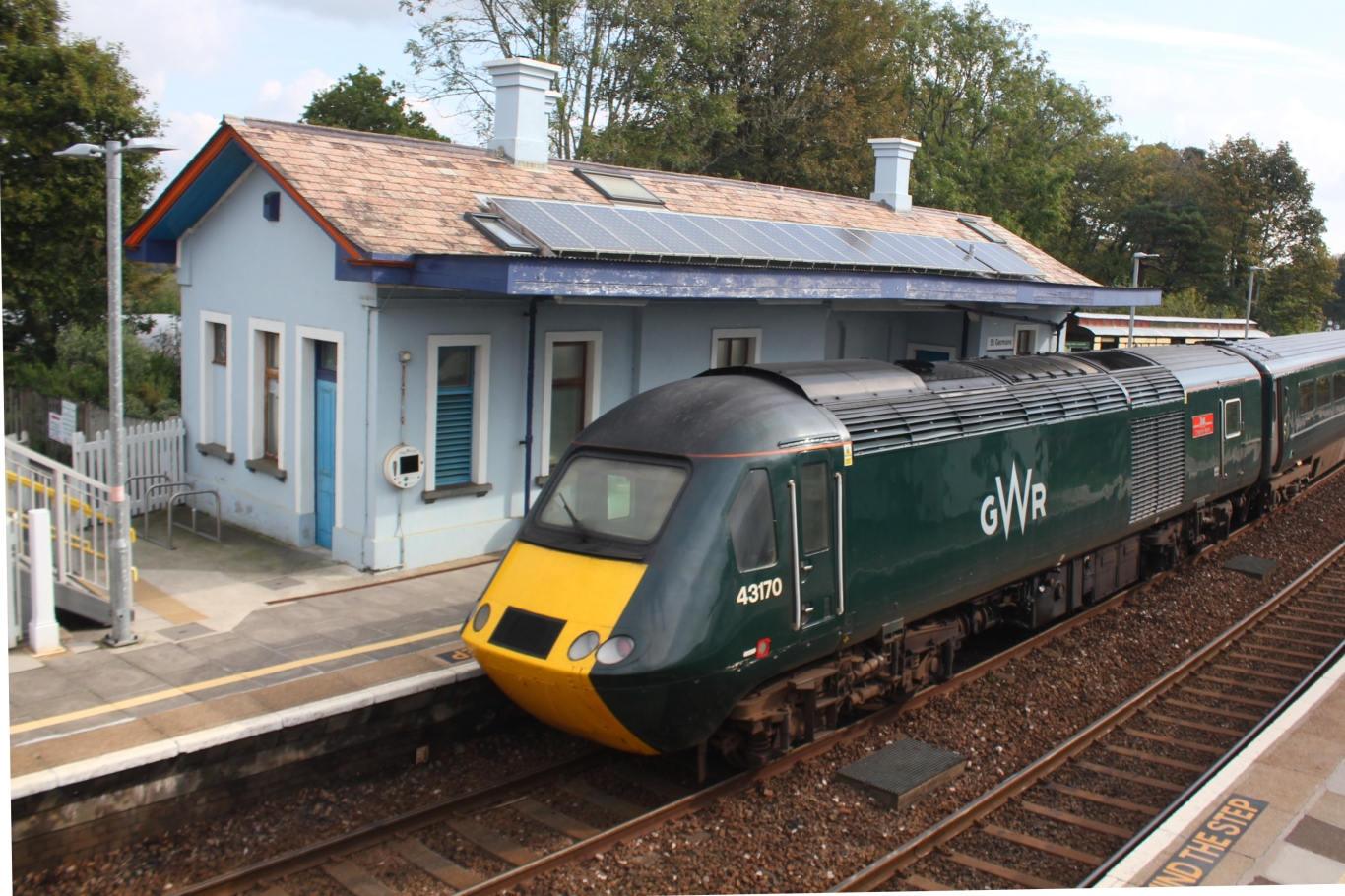
A Penzance to Plymouth and Cardiff Central service

St Germans is served by about half the trains on the Cornish Main Line between Penzance and Plymouth - these are mostly local stopping trains, but a few run through to/from London Paddington station. Sunday trains also call here, but on an irregular frequency with sizable gaps at certain times of day.

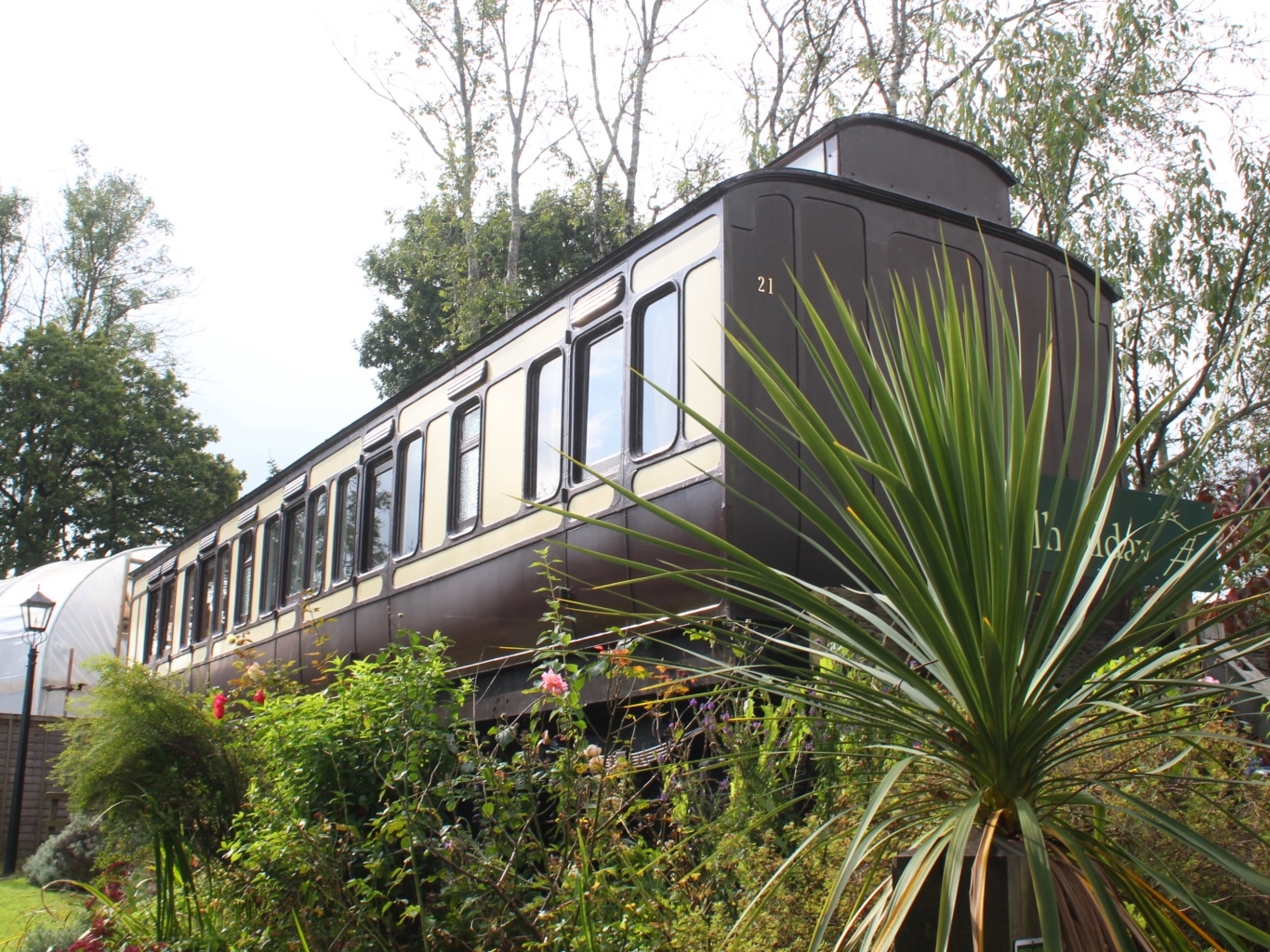
One of the camping coaches

Preceding station	National Rail	Following station
Saltash	Great Western Railway; Cornish Main Line	Menheniot
	Historical railways	
Defiance Platform; Line open, station closed	Great Western Railway; Cornish main line	Menheniot

== See also ==
- St Germans & Looe Railway, railway proposed in 1935 but not completed
