= This =

This may refer to:

- This, the singular proximal demonstrative pronoun

== Places ==
- This (Egypt), or Thinis, an ancient city in Upper Egypt
- This, Ardennes, a commune in France
- This, a country mentioned in the Periplus of the Erythraean Sea, likely China

== Arts, entertainment, and media ==
=== Music ===
==== Albums ====
- This (Peter Hammill album) (1998)
- This (The Motels album) (2008)
- This (Is What I Wanted to Tell You), a 2019 album by American band Lambchop

==== Songs ====
- "This" (song), a 2010 song by Darius Rucker
- "This", a 2015 song by Collective Soul from See What You Started by Continuing
- "This", a 2011 song by Ed Sheeran from +
- "This", a 1993 song by Hemingway Corner
- "This", a 2021 song by Megan McKenna
- "This", a 1995 song by Rod Stewart from A Spanner in the Works
- "This", a 2023 song by band OK Go
- "THIS", a 2014 instrumental by Sander van Doorn and Oliver Heldens

=== Periodicals ===
- This (Canadian magazine), a political journal
- This (journal), a poetry journal published in the US from 1971–1982

=== Television ===
- "This" (The X-Files), an episode of The X-Files
- This TV, a US TV channel

== Other uses ==
- this (computer programming), the identity function in many object-oriented computer languages
- This (fly), a genus of Australian kelp fly
- This, a brand of cigarettes made by Korea Tobacco & Ginseng Corporation
- Hervé This, French culinary chemist
