= Men (name) =

Men may refer to the following individuals:

Given name

- Men Nguyen (born 1954), Vietnamese-American poker player

Surname

- Alexander Men (1935–1990), Soviet theologian, biblical scholar and writer
- Mikhail Men (born 1960), Russian politician, son of Alexander
- Men Sam An (born 1953), Cambodian politician
