= Menheniot railway station =

Railway station in Cornwall, England

Menheniot Mahynyes
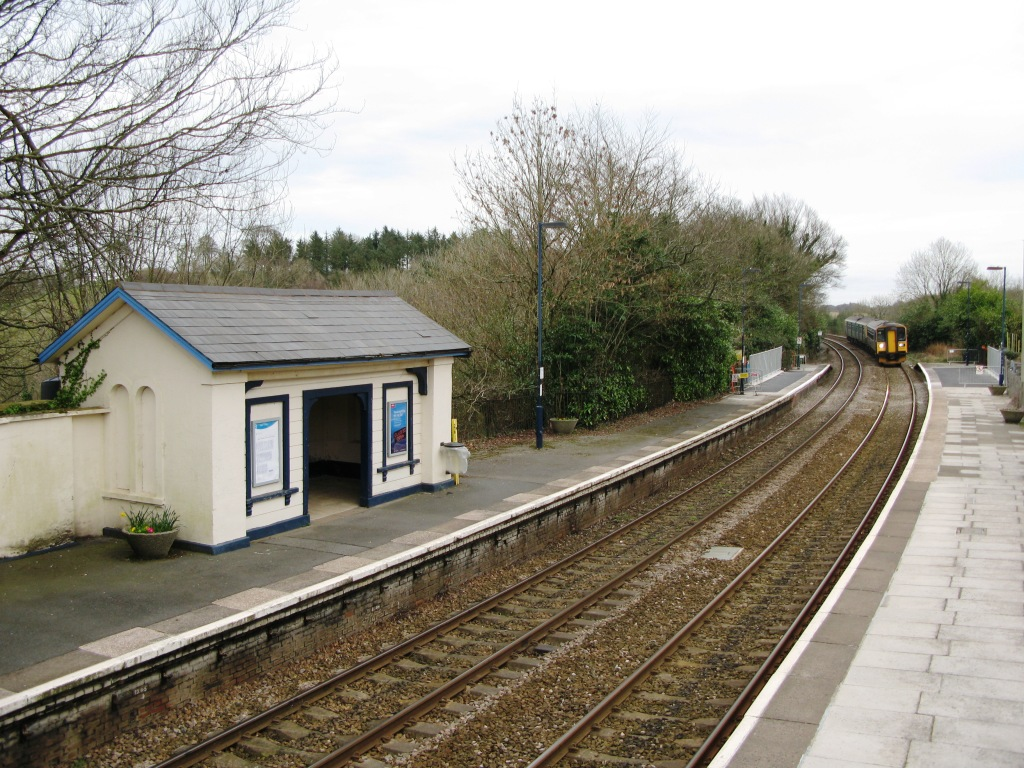

General information
- Location: Menheniot, Cornwall; England
- Coordinates: 50.427°N 4.410°W
- Grid reference: SX289612
- Manager: Great Western Railway
- Platforms: 2

Other information
- Station code: MEN
- Classification: DfT category F2

History
- Original company: Cornwall Railway
- Pre-grouping: Great Western Railway
- Post-grouping: Great Western Railway

Key dates
- Opened: 1859

Passengers
- 2021/22: ▲1,924
- 2022/23: ▲3,634
- 2023/24: ▲4,598
- 2024/25: ▲6,232
- 2025/26: ▲7,762
Location
Notes
- Passenger statistics from the Office of Rail and Road

Menheniot railway station (Cornish: Mahynyes) serves the village of Menheniot in Cornwall, England. It is 261 miles 61 chains (421.3 km) from London Paddington via Box and Plymouth Millbay.

The station is managed by Great Western Railway, whose local trains serve the station.

== History ==
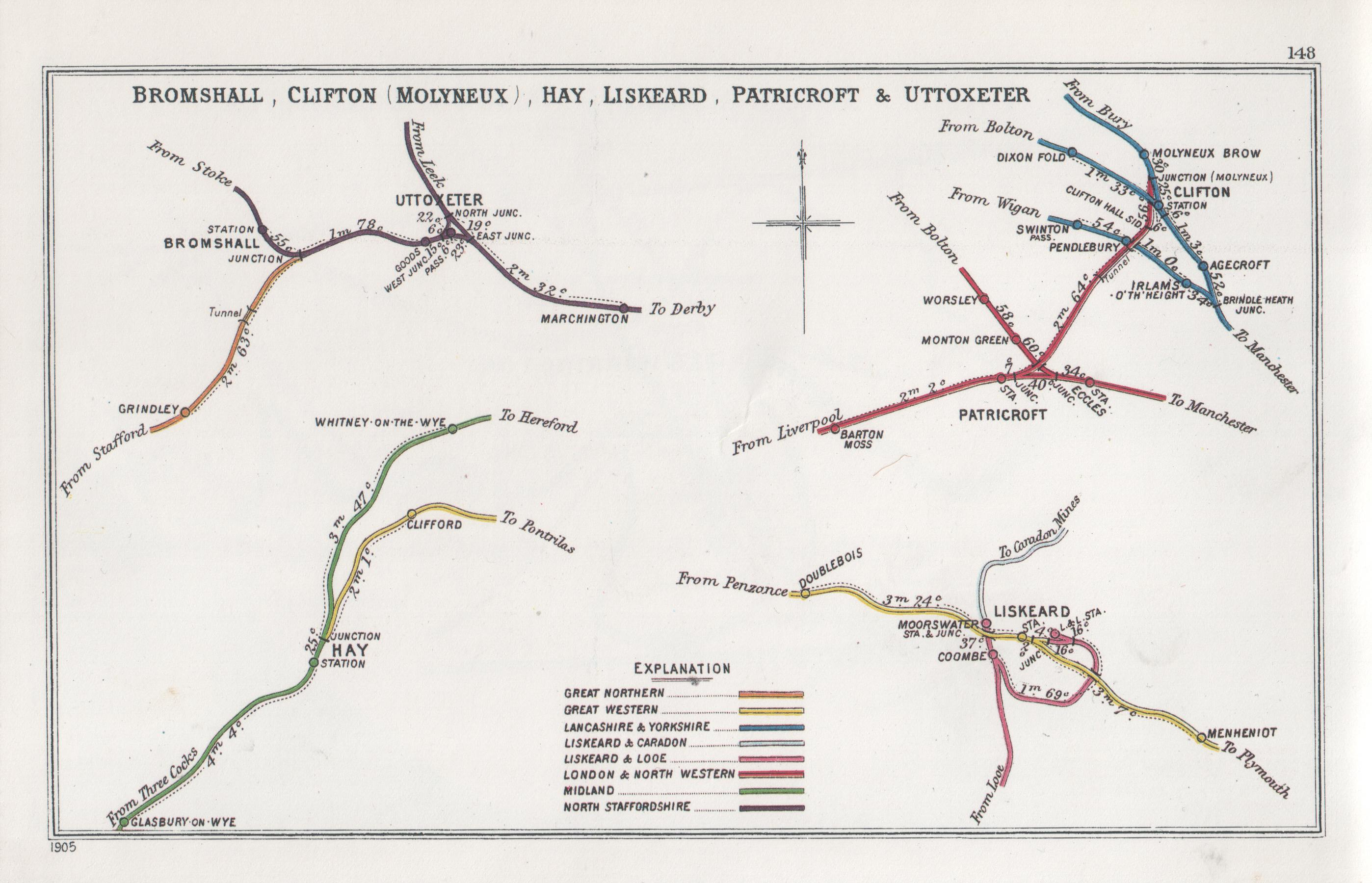
A 1905 Railway Clearing House Junction Diagram showing (lower right) railways in the vicinity of Menheniot

The station opened with the Cornwall Railway on 4 May 1859. It was described at the time as

"of small extent, consisting of a departure station, a stone building, having a projecting roof thrown over the platform for the protection of passengers. At the 'arrival' side of the line a stone erection, with a covered seat, has been provided, but no enclosed room".

The following year saw two cottages built for the use of the railway staff working here. The "stone erection" is still in existence, used as a waiting shelter.

The Cornwall Railway was amalgamated into the Great Western Railway on 1 July 1889. The Great Western Railway was nationalised into British Rail from 1 January 1948 which was privatised in the 1990s. Under British Rail the staff were removed from the station. For a few years the station was only served on request, but since December 2020 services have stopped without request.

=== Accidents and incidents ===
==== December 1873 ====
On 2 December 1873 two goods trains arrived at the station where they could pass each other before resuming their journey on the single tracks towards St Germans and Liskeard. The crossing loop was not at that time equipped with starting signals. The train for the latter had a clear line and so the signalman called out "All right Dick," to the guard. Unfortunately the guard for the other train was also called Dick and so told his driver to start, but the line was not clear as another train was already on the way down from St Germans.

William Yolland, the investigating officer for the Board of Trade, recommended that the staff and ticket system of regulating trains be adopted on all single lines.

==== February 1897 ====
An accident occurred on 9 February 1897 during the reconstruction of Coldrennick Viaduct, which is situated just outside the station. A gang of 17 workmen were suspended below the viaduct on a platform when it broke away, throwing 12 of the men 140 feet to their deaths. Two of the gangers were criticised for not fixing safety chains and using poor quality wood for the platforms.

==== November 1897 ====
Another accident happened on 15 November 1897 during the reconstruction of nearby Trevido Viaduct. On this occasion a rope gave way while five men were hoisting a wooden beam up onto the new viaduct. One of them let go of his rope too soon, which meant that the wood swung free and knocked two of the gang to their deaths.

== Services ==
Menheniot is served by eight Great Western Railway trains between Penzance and Plymouth in each direction on weekdays, mainly at peak periods, one of which goes to London Paddington departing at 07:37, which does not call on Saturdays. On Sundays, Menheniot receives four trains in each direction.

Preceding station	National Rail	Following station
St Germans	Great Western Railway; Cornish Main Line	Liskeard
