= Man (disambiguation) =

A man is an adult male of the modern human species of all culture and nationalities, or may refer to the species as a whole.

Man or MAN may also refer to:

== Places ==
- Isle of Man, located in the Irish Sea, part of the British Isles
- Man Island (Andaman and Nicobar Islands), a small uninhabited island in the Bay of Bengal
- Man (Vidhan Sabha constituency), political district in India
- Man Department, Ivory Coast
  - Man, Ivory Coast, a town and capital of the department
- Roman Catholic Diocese of Man, Ivory Coast
- Man, West Virginia, a town in the United States
- Man., abbreviation for Manitoba, a Canadian province
- Man, Vikramgad, a village in Maharashtra, India

== Arts and entertainment ==
=== Music ===
- Man (band), a Welsh progressive rock group
  - Man (Man album), 1971
- Man (Neneh Cherry album), the third solo album by Swedish singer Neneh Cherry, released in 1996
- "Man" (Skepta song), 2016
- "Man" (JoJo song), 2020
- "Man", a 1989 song on the album Staring at the Sun by Level 42
- "Man", a 2003 song on the album Fever to Tell by the Yeah Yeah Yeahs
- "Man", a 2016 song on the album Air for Free by Relient K
- "Man", a 2018 song on the album Blue Madonna by Børns

=== Other arts and entertainment ===
- Man (Middle-earth), people in the writings of J. R. R. Tolkien
- "Man", a statue by Virgil Cantini
- Ultraman, a Japanese television series often referred to as "Man"
- Mard (1985 film), or Man, 1985 Indian action film by Manmohan Desai

== Businesses ==
- MAN Truck & Bus, a German engineering company that manufactures (amongst other things) buses and trucks
- MAN SE, was a commercial vehicle and diesel engine manufacturing and engineering company based in Munich
- Man Group plc, a British financial services company
- The stock symbol of Manpower, Inc., an American employment agency

== Computing ==
- Metropolitan area network, large computer networks usually spanning a campus or a city
- The "man" command, used to retrieve a man page, a software documentation page on Unix and Unix-like operating systems

== People ==
- Man (name), a list of people with the given name or surname
- Man or Nanman, an ancient Chinese ethnic group
- Standard romanization of the Manchu people

== Political organizations ==
- Marea Adunare Naţională, the Great National Assembly in Communist Romania
- Mongolian People's Party, a political party in Mongolia (Mongolian: Монгол Ардын Нам)
- Movement of Arab Nationalists
- Movimento de Acção Nacional or the National Action Movement (Portugal)
- Movimiento de Acción Nacional or the National Action Movement (Venezuela)
- National Alternative Movement, a political party in Moldova (Mișcarea Alternativa Națională)
- Partido MAN (Movementu Antia Nobo or New Antilles Movement), a political party in Curaçao

== Other uses ==
- Man!, an American anarchist periodical (1933–1940)
- Man (word) for the etymology of "man"
- The Man, a derisive slang phrase for higher authority
- Man: His Nature and Place in the World, a 1940 book by Arnold Gehlen
- Man (journal) (1901–1994), continued by The Journal of the Royal Anthropological Institute
- Man (unit), an ancient Arabic and Persian unit of mass
- In neo-pagan Germanic mysticism, the alternative name of the Norse Algiz rune, where it is used as a purported life rune
- A chess piece or pawn; sometimes the word "piece" is defined to exclude pawns
- Man, referring to a human, regardless of gender
- Manchester Airport's IATA airport code
- Manchester Piccadilly station's National Rail station code MAN

== See also ==
- De Man (disambiguation), a list of people with this surname
- Mankind (disambiguation)
- Men (disambiguation)
- The Man (disambiguation)
- The Men (disambiguation)
- Mans (disambiguation)
- Masculinity
- Gentleman
