= Boscarne Junction railway station =

Railway in Cornwall, United Kingdom

Boscarne Junction Kemper Boskarn
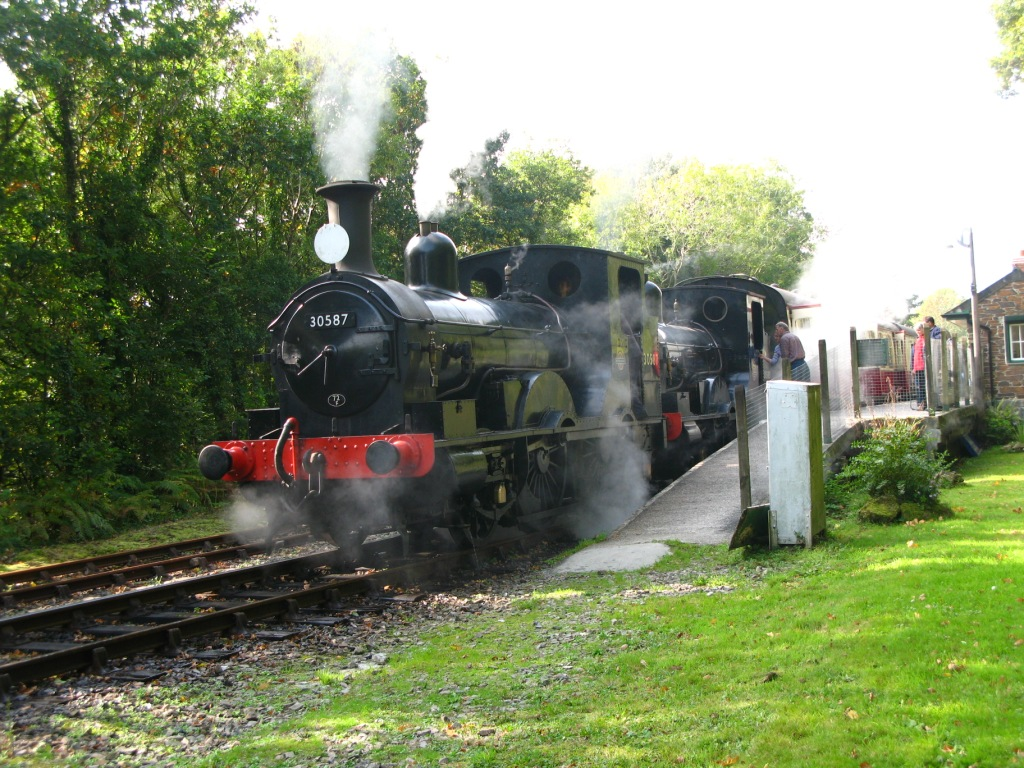

General information
- Location: Dunmere, Cornwall; England
- Coordinates: 50.4739°N 4.7614°W
- Grid reference: SX040674
- System: Station on heritage railway
- Operator: Bodmin and Wenford Railway
- Platforms: 1

History
- Original company: Bodmin and Wenford Railway

Key dates
- 1996: Opened
Location

Boscarne Junction railway station (Cornish: Kemper Boskarn) is a railway station on the Bodmin and Wenford Railway in Cornwall, England, United Kingdom, and is its current terminus of the railway. It is adjacent to the Camel Trail, a long-distance footpath and cycle trail.

In earlier days it was the junction for lines to Bodmin North and Bodmin General to Padstow and Wenfordbridge.

== History ==
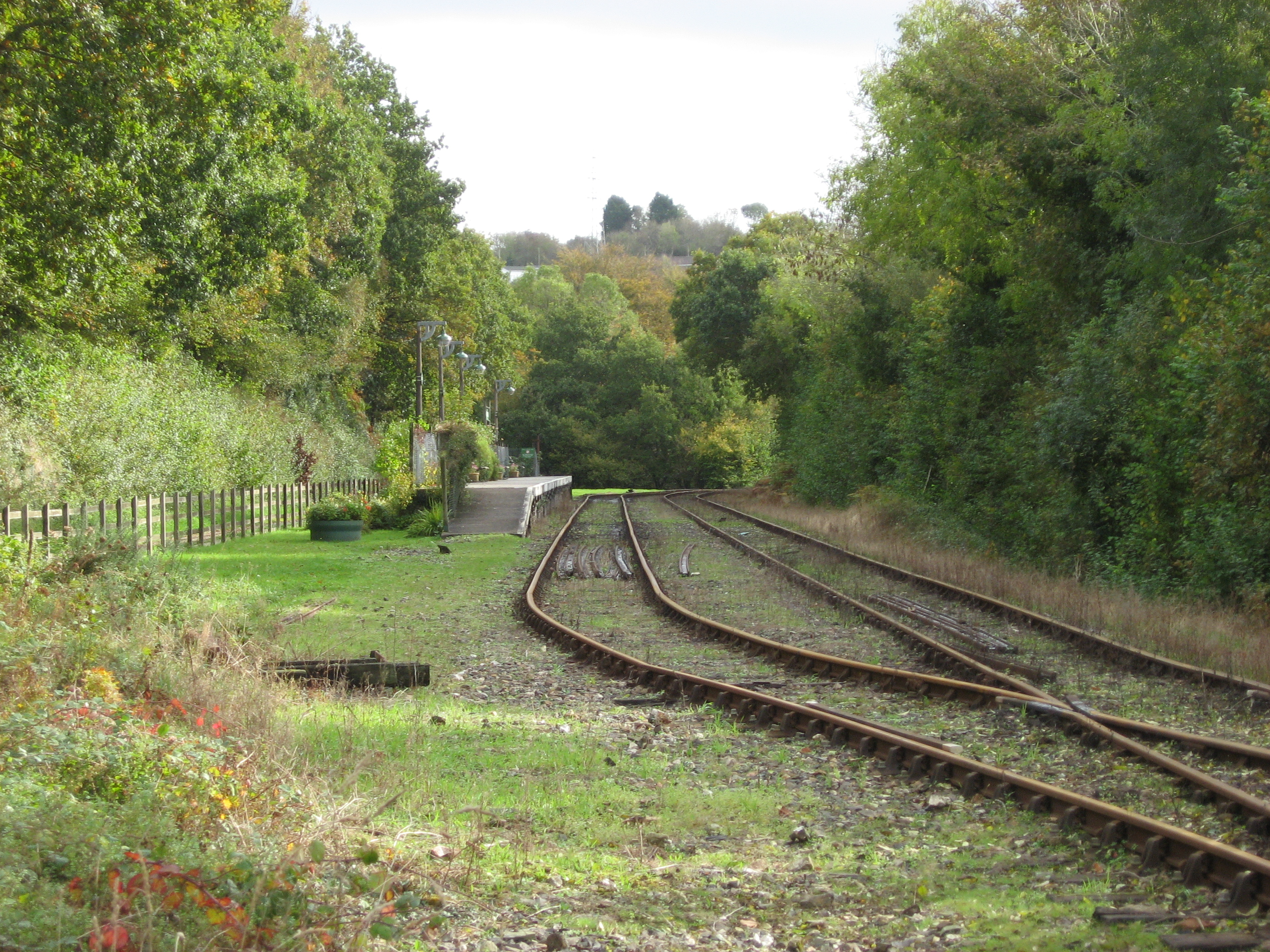
Boscarne Junction

Boscarne Junction was created in 1888 when the Great Western Railway built a line to connect from their Bodmin General railway station to the Bodmin and Wadebridge Railway.

Originally there was a loop on either side of the line, each straddling the junction which was controlled by a signal box; a second and longer loop was added from the signal box extending down the Wenfordbridge line well beyond the junction before 1911. The purpose of the GWR line was to take china clay from Wenford clay dries to the docks at Fowey, the traffic having previously been taken by the Bodmin and Wenford Railway to Wadebridge.

From 15 June 1964 to 18 April 1966 a small halt was built at the junction to enable a separate shuttle service to operate along the Bodmin North branch to connect with trains between Padstow and Bodmin Road.

The line to Wadebridge was truncated at the road just beyond the signal box in 1981, and the line closed completely on 3 October 1983.

== Revival ==
Bodmin and Wenford Railway opened a new station at Boscarne Junction on 15 August 1996 for its trains to Bodmin General. Today the station consists of a platform with enclosed shelter. One of the former signal posts can still be seen in the small grass 'triangle' area just beyond the end of the platform.

Although the end of the line, it has been proposed that an extension to Wadebridge will be constructed.

== Services ==
Preceding station	Heritage railways	Following station
Terminus	Bodmin and Wenford Railway	Bodmin General
