= Dunmere, Cornwall =

Hamlet in England

Coordinates: 50.4771°N 4.7527°W

Dunmere: Cornish: Dinmeur
- Location within Cornwall
- OS grid reference: SX048678
- Civil parish: Bodmin
- Unitary authority: Cornwall
- Ceremonial county: Cornwall
- Region: South West
- Country: England
- Sovereign state: United Kingdom
- Post town: BODMIN
- Postcode district: PL31
- Dialling code: 01208
- Police: Devon and Cornwall
- Fire: Cornwall
- Ambulance: South Western
- UK Parliament: North Cornwall

Dunmere (Cornish: Dinmeur, meaning Great Fort) is a hamlet in Cornwall in the United Kingdom. It is situated one mile northwest of Bodmin in the valley of the River Camel on the A389 road.

The former branch of the Bodmin and Wenford Railway to Wenfordbridge crossed the A389 road at Dunmere. This section of the railway now forms part of the Camel Trail, a long-distance footpath and cycle trail.

Boscarne Junction railway station, the current terminus of the railway, is situated a mile (1.6 km) west of Dunmere.

Dunmere has a pub, The Borough Arms.

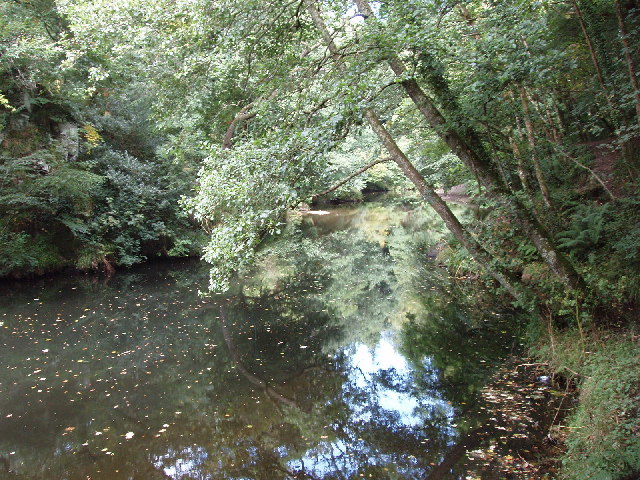
The River Camel at Dunmere Weir

== Governance ==
In local government terms, Dunmere is within the civil parish of Bodmin and the unitary authority Cornwall Council division of Bodmin St Mary's. The Member of Parliament for the North Cornwall constituency is Scott Mann, Conservative.
