= Disused railway stations on the Bodmin to Wadebridge line =

There are eight disused railway stations between Wadebridge and Bodmin North on the former Bodmin and Wadebridge Railway in Cornwall, in the United Kingdom, with ten other closed sidings on the branches to Ruthern Bridge and Wenfordbridge. The section from Boscarne Junction to Bodmin General is currently part of the Bodmin and Wenford Steam Railway; the line from Wadebridge to Wenfordbridge is now part of the Camel Trail, and the line to Ruthern Bridge can be followed for much of its length as it runs parallel to a public road.

== Background ==
The Bodmin and Wadebridge Railway (B&W) opened in 1834 to carry sand brought up the River Camel for use as a soil improver. Extensions were added to Wenfordbridge and Ruthern Bridge to handle freight traffic later that year, particularly stone from the De Lank quarry and Tin from the Mulberry mine. In 1847 the London and South Western Railway bought the B&W, and connections to the parent company came via the North Cornwall Line in 1895. Connection to the GWR at Bodmin Road was earlier, in 1888, and the line was finally extended to Padstow in 1899. For much of its life the line was famed for the Beattie Well Tanks, three small engines built in the 1870s and transported to Wadebridge by sea to work the lightly laid curves of the line to Wenfordbridge.

== Wadebridge to Bodmin ==
=== Shooting Range Platform ===
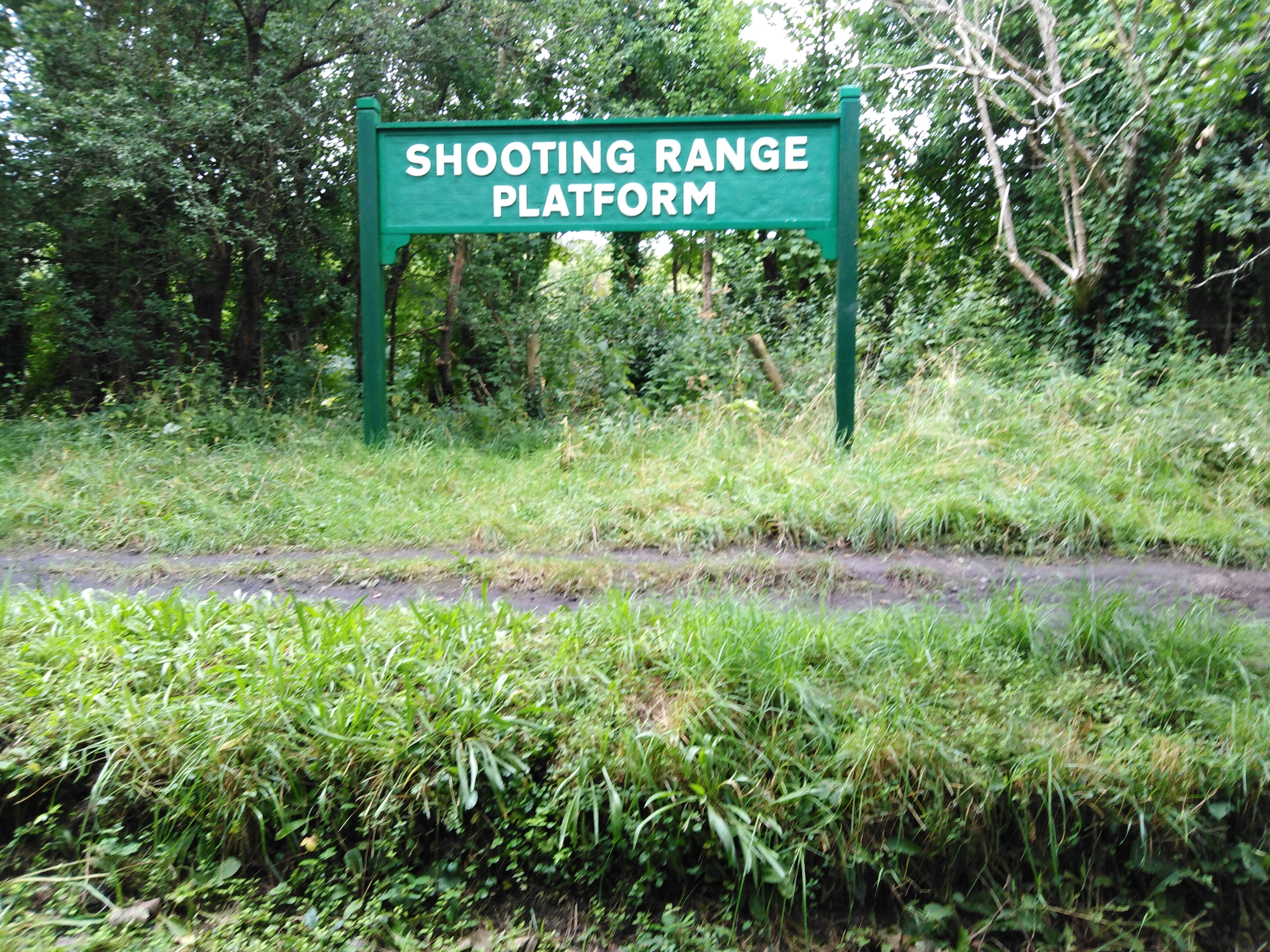
Shooting Range Platform on the Camel trail in August 2021

Sometimes referred to as "Rifle Range Platform", the platform was built around 1880 (some sources give a date as late as 1885) to serve a firing range, with trains only stopping with written permission from the army. Periods of use centred around the Boer War and World War I. Troops were always sent by rail as there was no other means of access. Use of the range ceased after this, although the platform, with its cinder surface, was used until 1947 or possibly later. Named Shooting Range Platform, although locally known as "Target", the platform still stands today with a large railway style sign, although none was originally present.

=== Grogley Halt ===
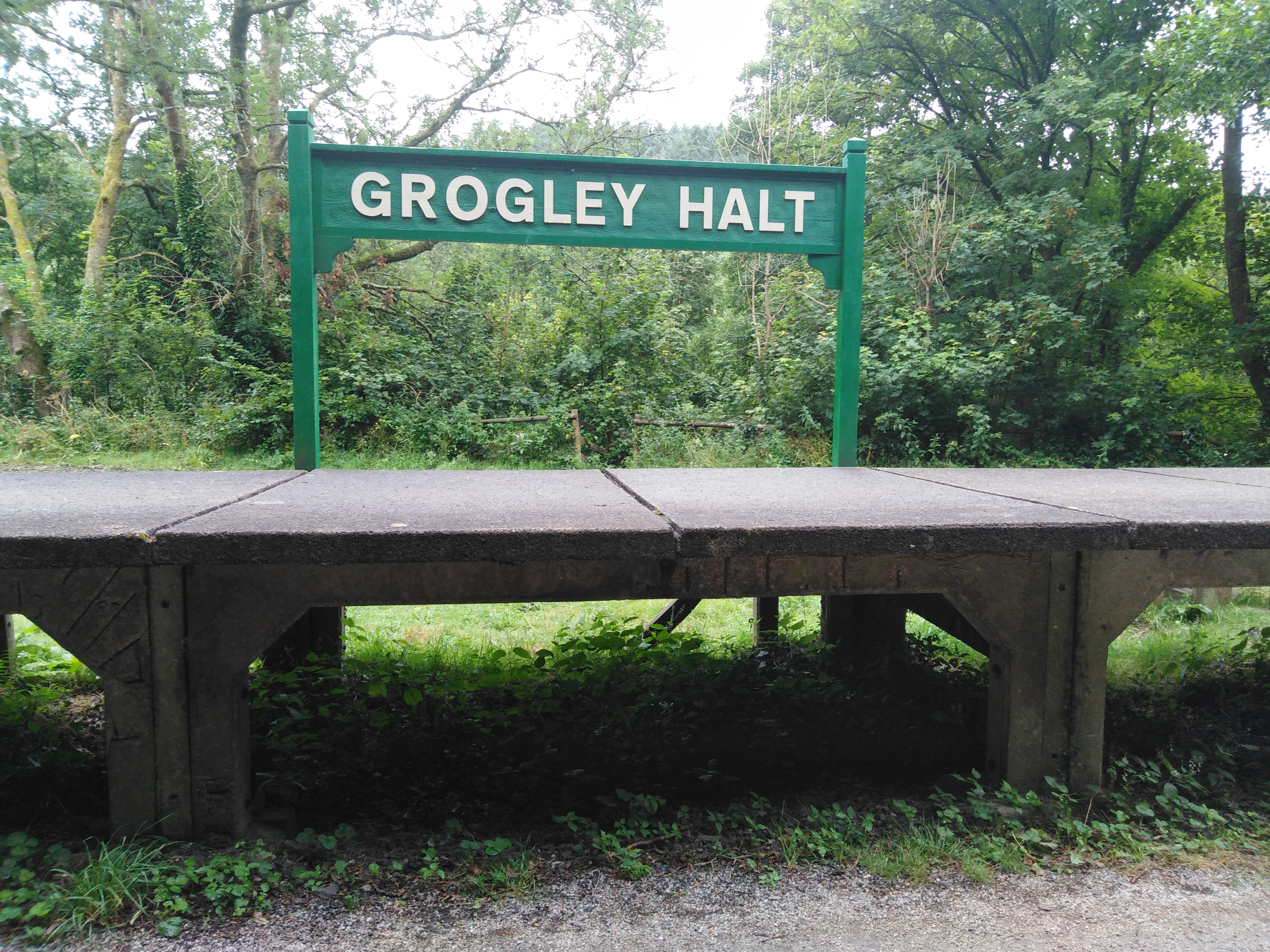
Grogley Halt on the Camel trail in August 2021.

Grogley Halt (Cornish: Gorta an Grugel) (50.4832°N 4.7995°W) opened on 2 July 1906 in association with the railmotor service between Bodmin North and Wadebridge although the wooden platform was unlit and trains only stopped during daylight. It is unclear whether any shelter was provided initially, but a GWR style pagoda shelter was provided before 1933, being replaced by a wooden shelter when the platform was rebuilt in concrete in the 1950s. The line just north of Grogley halt was realigned in 1888, the junction to Ruthern Bridge being on the old alignment which was disconnected at one end only. A ground frame controlled the new junction and the access was gated, beyond this access involved a reversal on the old alignment to gain the Ruthern Bridge line. The early method of accessing the platform across the River Camel is unclear as access was latterly via the bridge that carried the Ruthern Bridge line after that was lifted in 1934, and a reproduction of a map from 1907 does not show the halt or any access. The steam rail motor made 14 trips a day giving a regular service, but this had reduced to 8 in each direction by 1938 and 7 in each direction in 1966, the year before closure. The station closed to passengers on 30 January 1967. Today the platform survives in relatively good condition.

=== Nanstallon Halt ===
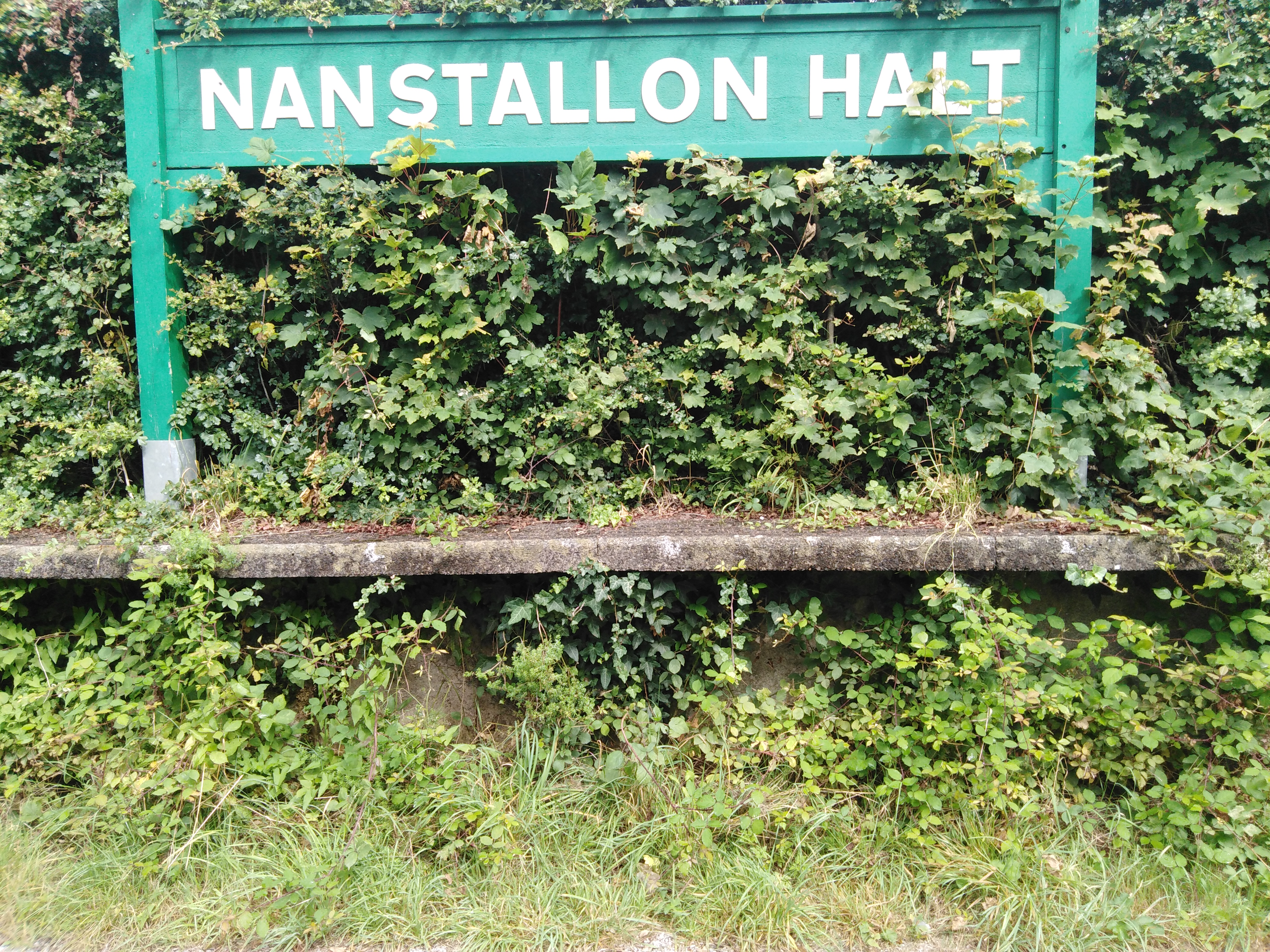
Nanstallon Halt on the Camel trail in August 2021

Opened here as part of the original line was a single siding, or wharf, which at one time included a goods shed. Latterly the siding was gated and the controlling ground frame was in a wooden shelter which was erected in April 1943. The wharf was taken out of use on 2 May 1960 and removed in 1961. The date of the level crossing and associated signal box is a matter of conjecture, but the signal box and crossing gates probably date from 1888 when the junction at Boscarne was created. The rough track which crossed the railway at this location was improved by the LSWR for the opening of the halt on 2 July 1906. The halt itself (50.4748°N 4.7716°W), as at Grogley, was of timber without any form of shelter. A GWR "pagoda" shelter was provided later which lasted into the 1960s. The siding was closed 2 May 1960 and the associated ground frame removed in April 1961. Like Grogley, the early rail motor service made 14 trips each day, with the service reducing to 8 each way in 1938 and 7 each way immediately before closure. The station closed to passengers on 30 January 1967. Today the station survives in a rather poor state, most of the platform has been taken over by bushes, with one of the old station buildings used as a garden shed. Remnants of the former level crossing can still be seen.

=== Boscarne Junction ===
Boscarne Junction was created in September 1887 when the GWR opened a line connecting from their station in Bodmin to the Bodmin and Wadebridge Railway (now owned by the L&SWR). It was a simple Y-shaped junction, with a signal-box and level-crossing where the two lines diverged. Latterly this was referred to as Boscarne No.1 Junction, and while some references give Dunmere Junction being referred to as Boscarne No.2 Junction, a ground Frame installed immediately in the fork of the Ex-GWR and Ex-SR lines installed in May 1913 was Boscarne No2. Junction. The purpose of the GWR line was to take china clay from Wenford clay dries to the docks at Fowey, the traffic having previously been taken by the LSWR to Wadebridge. Originally there was a single siding between the two diverging lines, which was connected to them at both ends and used for the exchange of traffic between the GWR and L&SWR. The line to Wenfordbridge diverged from the line to Bodmin North a short distance to the east at Dunmere Junction, where there was just a ground-frame. In 1914 a second loop siding was added at Boscarne Junction on the north side of the L&SWR line, extending from the signal-box almost to Dunmere Junction, and this was used then mainly for the transfer of the Wendfordbridge traffic. The line to Wadebridge closed on 17 December 1978 and was truncated at the road just beyond the signal box in 1981. The line here closed completely on 3 October 1983, but trains returned to Boscarne Junction in 1997 when the Bodmin and Wenford Steam Railway built a platform and began operating trains from Bodmin General. This new platform is west of the site of Boscarne Exchange Platform (see next section).

=== Boscarne Exchange Platform ===
The platforms here were completed in May 1964, and from 15 June that year the passenger service between Bodmin North and Wadebridge was truncated at Boscarne Junction, passengers from Bodmin North using a shuttle service operated by an AC railbus, also serving Dunmere Halt, to travel as far as Boscarne; onward travel was by using the Bodmin General to Padstow services. In order for passengers to change trains, British Railways built a station (50.4740°N 4.7610°W), among the smallest in England. Alongside the line to Bodmin North it had a small patch of clear ground, sometimes described as a Ground- or Rail-Level platform, to allow the railbus to lower the ladder fitted below the passenger door, while there was one small platform at a more normal height which was long enough for just one coach situated on the line to Bodmin General, this being dominated by a huge sign stating 'Boscarne Junction. Change for Dunmere and Bodmin North'. There was no shelter, no public access, no tickets, and initially no lighting. The station, referred to in the timetable as Boscarne Exchange Platform, closed on 18 April 1966 when two trains daily from Bodmin General reversed at the junction, travelling to Dunmere Halt and Bodmin North before returning and continuing on to Wadebridge. It reopened on 2 May 1966 before closing with the line on 30 January 1967. Today, nothing exists of the former platform. The Bodmin and Wenford Railway opened in 1997 a station called Boscarne Junction a short distance west of the site of the exchange platform.

=== Dunmere Halt ===
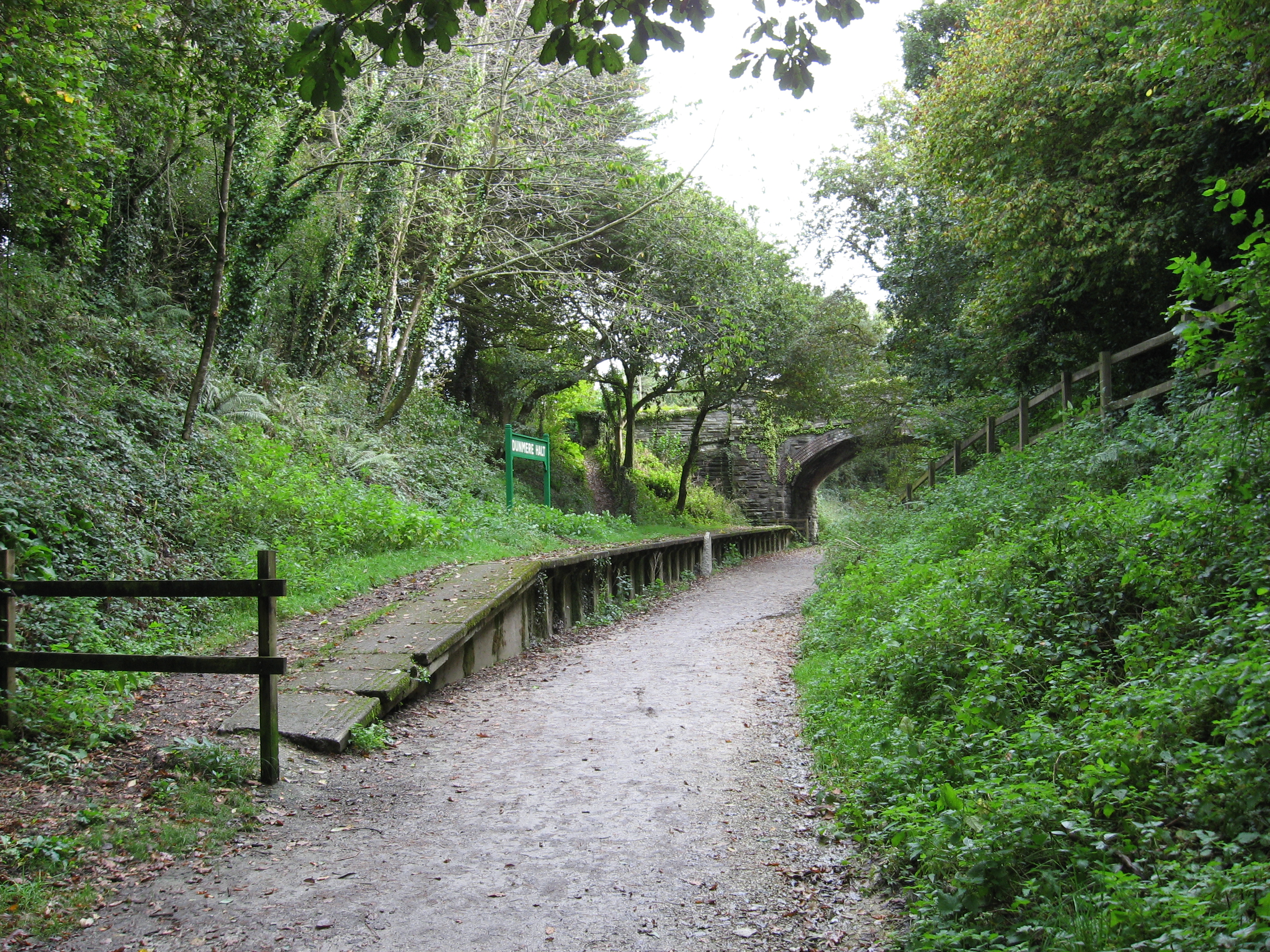
Dunmere Halt

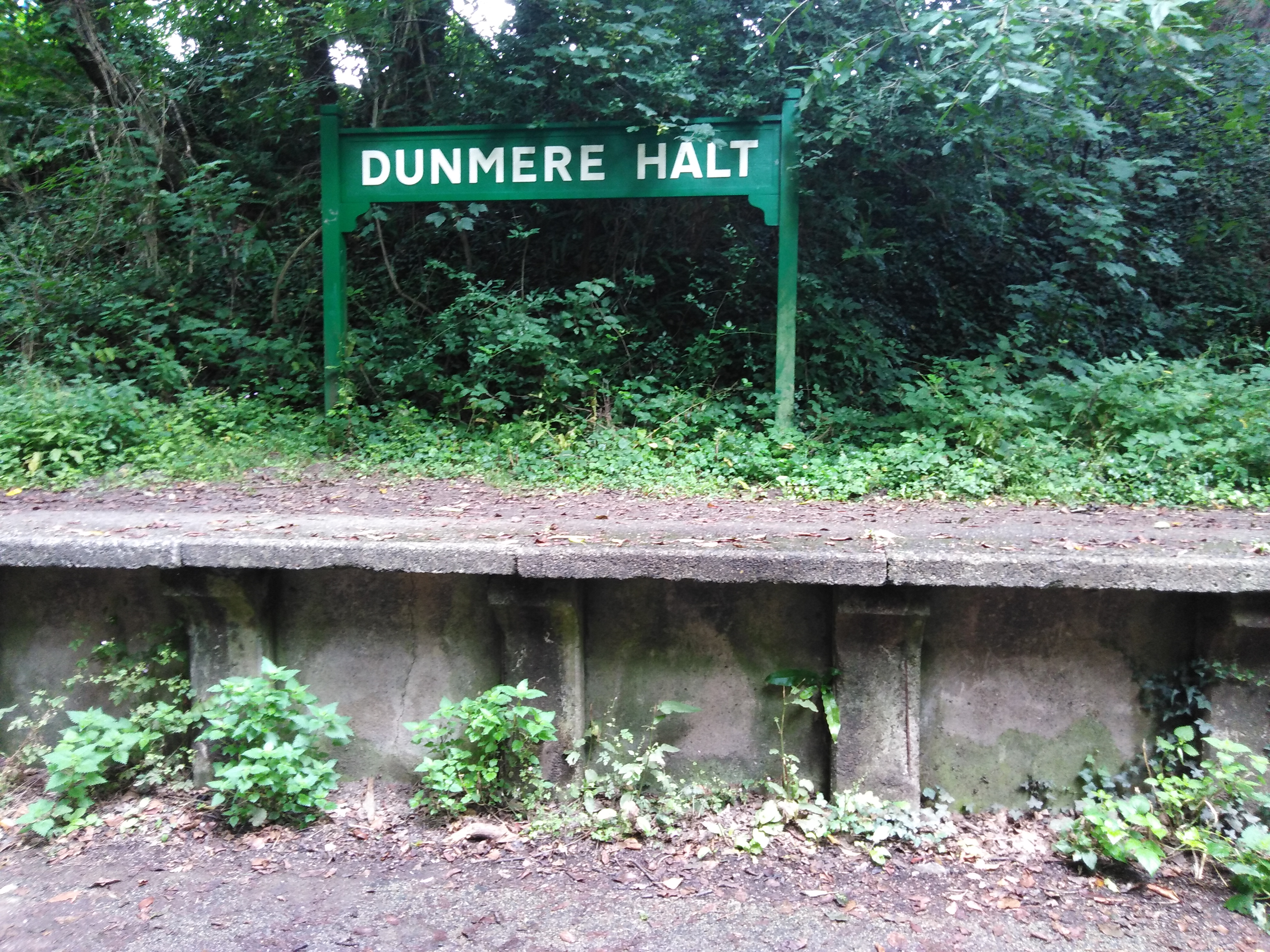
Dunmere Halt station sign on the Camel trail in August 2021

Dunmere Halt (Cornish: Dinmeur) (50.4753°N 4.7534°W) was opened, like the halts at Grogley and Nanstallon, on 2 July 1906 in association with the railmotor service between Bodmin North and Wadebridge. The original platform at Dunmere is a matter of conjecture, but in the 1960s it was of concrete with a GWR style pagoda shelter. The halt was situated in a shallow cutting, and access was by a short footpath sloping down from the A389 overbridge which was situated at one end of the platform. Again the rail motor service made 14 trips each day with this reducing to 8 trains each way in 1938. With the inauguration of Boscarne Exchange Platform, there were 5 trains each way in 1965 with the first outbound originating from Wadebridge and the last return terminating at Wadebridge; other than these it was a shuttle service between Bodmin North and Boscarne Exchange Platform. By 1966 there were just 2 trains each way, both starting/terminating at Bodmin Road. The station closed to passengers on 30 January 1967 when operation of the line from Dunmere Junction to Bodmin North ceased. The platform is still in situ today and has been carefully maintained. The trackbed is now a footpath.

=== Bodmin North ===
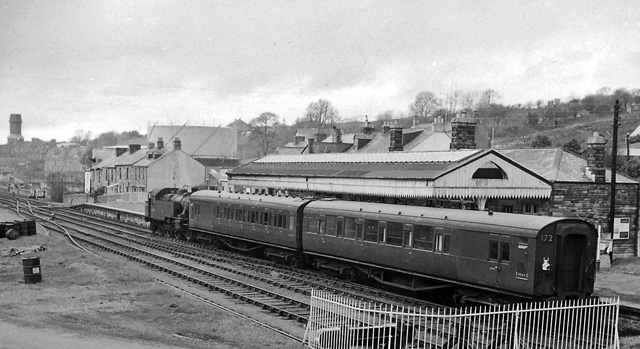
Bodmin North in 1964

When the Bodmin and Wadebridge Railway opened on 4 July 1834, trains could only get as far as a temporary terminus at Dunmere, the station at Bodmin not being opened until 30 September 1834. From 1 November 1886 to 1 November 1895 the station was closed to allow for a realignment of the railway at Dunmere, replacing a level crossing with an overbridge, and complete renewal of the track. The new station (50.4731°N 4.7228°W) had a single platform face containing the station building and a canopy. South of the platform road was a run-round and a third road giving access to a short siding and a cattle dock. In addition a siding left the line in front of the signal box via a double-slip to serve the goods shed. There was also a trailing link to a private siding for the gas works opposite. A 50-foot (15 m) turntable had been provided before the rebuilding work, and remained connected although usage was low as most passenger trains were operated by tank engines. The station was renamed Bodmin North in 1949 to differentiate it from Bodmin General. Freight facilities were withdrawn on 24 July 1964 although by this time the lines to the cattle dock had already been lifted on 10 May 1964 and those to the Gas Works on 20 February 1964. The station and all facilities closed on 30 January 1967. The station has been completely demolished and the site is now occupied by a car park.

== Boscarne to Bodmin General ==
=== St Lawrence Platform ===
A platform, nominally provided for the hamlet of St Lawrence, was opened in 1906 on the GWR line from Bodmin to Boscarne Junction. It closed in 1917.

=== Bodmin General ===
The Great Western Railway opened a terminus in Bodmin on 27 May 1887, the line diverging from the Cornish Main Line at Bodmin Road. On 3 September 1888 a new line connected with the Bodmin and Wadebridge Railway at Dunmere Junction.

Passenger services ceased on 30 January 1967, freight services were withdrawn from Bodmin General on 1 May 1967 and the signal box closed later that year but the station was retained as a reversal point for freight trains from Wenford until 3 October 1983. It is now the principal station of the Bodmin and Wenford Steam Railway.

== Grogley to Ruthern Bridge ==
=== Ruthern Bridge ===
The extension to Ruthern Bridge was opened on 30 September 1834, and served mines in the locality producing copper, iron and lead, and especially tin from the Mulberry Mine. Provision for this traffic was made by two sidings, one of which ran over a series of sand drops; an additional loop capable of accommodating eight wagons was added 6 chains towards Grogley in 1914. There were proposals in the 1870s to extend the line to connect with the Cornwall Minerals Railway but these came to nothing, so the only change made to the line was provision at an early date of a siding near to Grogley junction to serve an ochre pit although this was removed soon after the pit ceased working in 1912. There was never any passenger service, Ruthern Bridge being little more than a small collection of cottages and farms, although in the early years passengers were conveyed unofficially in the tool wagon. The line, which climbed steadily at 1 in 158 for most of its length, closed on 29 November 1933 with the track being lifted the following year.

== Boscarne Junction to Wenfordbridge ==
=== Minor sidings ===
Dunmere

The single trailing siding at Dunmere, which was situated on the left of the line immediately after crossing the A389, was a public siding (as opposed to a private siding), and for much of its life the main traffic was grain for Hawke's mill. Originally termed "borough bounds wharf" for being just outside the Bodmin boundary, the siding closed on 14 May 1969 and was removed in November that year.

Penhargard

A single facing siding was provided at Penhargard, although it was closed and removed prior to 1925.

Helland A single facing siding was provided on the side of the line nearest the River Camel at Helland Wharf. Pictures show the buildings, as at other places on the B&W, extremely close to the line. The siding closed on 2 May 1960.

Tresarrett Quarry

A single facing siding with a gate was provided for Tresarrett quarry from around 1922, but closed in the 1930s. A narrow-gauge line ran across the river by a small bridge (still there in 1991) to bring material from the quarry on the other side of the river. There are the substantial remains of a loading ramp right by the trackbed still there 2013.

Stump Oak siding

A loop 7 chains in length was provided at Stump Oak, or Parkyns, around 1880 although this had been removed by 1923.

Tresarrett Wharf At Tresarret there was a loop on the north side of the line some 6 chains in length, this was closed in July 1970 and removed the following year. A shorter siding on the other side of the line was removed on 18 January 1932.

=== Wenford clay dries ===
China clay traffic started in 1862 and eventually English China Clays Lovering Pochin had six clay dries at Wenford sidings served by a pipe delivering clay slurry from Stannon Moor over four miles distant. Initially there was a loop serving dries 1 and 2, with a line extending back then diverging to give access to dries 3 to 6 which were set back further from the main running line. The first part of the loop by dries 3-6 and associated access, including the facing point, were removed between 1920 and 1922, at which time the loop to dries 1 and 2 was extended by 9 chains towards Wenfordbridge. Traffic to the dries was coal inward and china clay outward; high quality bagged clay in vans and lower quality in sheeted open wagons called clay hoods. After the closure of Wenfordbridge in 1971 the line ended just beyond the clay dries, 11 miles and 71 chains from Wadebridge. The line closed completely on 3 October 1983.

=== Wenfordbridge ===
The hamlet of Wenfordbridge was the furthest outpost of the LSWR from London Waterloo. It opened on 30 September 1834 as part of the Bodmin and Wadebridge Railway and after an unsuccessful proposal in the 1870s to extend the line to Delabole changed very little until closure in 1971. There were three sidings for loading and unloading goods, predominantly coal inwards and stone out from local quarries, basic manpower being supplemented in 1926 by the Southern Railway installing a five-ton capacity gantry crane spanning two of the sidings. A fourth siding continued on to the De Lank quarries. The layout was altered in 1922 by the extension of one of the sidings towards Wenford in order to create a run-round loop, but there were no other changes until the link to the quarry and one of the sidings were closed on 31 October 1966. These were removed in 1967 although the De Lank rails remained beyond the road.

=== De Lank Quarry ===
At the end of one of the sidings at Wenfordbridge the line continued, curving sharply off to the right and crossing the public road without barrier or sign before continuing via a rope-worked incline of 1 in 8 over a hill and down to the De Lank Quarries of Thos. W. Ward half a mile distant. The incline itself was of three rails; the inner or centre rail being common to wagons both ascending and descending the incline. There was no engine working the incline which worked on the balance principle; horse power was used for shunting until introduction of a Simplex shunter in the 1920s. The line was opened in the 1890s and closed around 1940 although the rails across the road remained until 1967 when the link to British Rail was removed.

== Bibliography ==
- Atterbury, Paul (2009). Tickets Please. David and Charles. ISBN 978-0-7153-2876-7.
- Cooke, R. A. (1977). Track Layout Diagrams of the GWR and BR WR, Section 10: West Cornwall. Harwell: R. A. Cooke.
- Croughton, Godfrey; Kidner, R. W.; Young, Alan (1982). Private and Untimetabled Railway Stations, Halts and Stopping Places. The Oakwood Press. ISBN 978-0-85361-281-0. OCLC 10507501.
- Fairclough, Tony; Alan Wills (1979). Southern Branch Line Special No. 1; Bodmin and Wadebridge 1834-1978. Truro: D. Bradford Barton. ISBN 0-85153-343-4.
- Hawkins, Mac (1999). LSWR West Country Lines: Then and Now. Grange Books Ltd. ISBN 1-84013-322-8.
- Hurst, Geoffrey (1983). Miles and Chains 4 - Western. Worksop: Milepost Publications. ISBN 9780947796037.
- Kidner, R.W. (1985). Southern Railway Halts Survey and Gazetteer. Locomotion Papers. Vol. 156. Headington, Oxford: The Oakwood Press. ISBN 0-85361-321-4.
- Mitchell, Vic; Smith, Keith (1996). Branch Lines around Bodmin. Midhurst: Middleton Press. ISBN 1-873793-839.
- Semmens, Peter (1988). Railway World Special: The Withered Arm - The Southern West of Exeter. Weybridge: Ian Allan. ISBN 0-7110-1806-5.
