= Bodmin General railway station =

Heritage railway station in Cornwall, England

Bodmin General

General information
- Location: Bodmin, Cornwall, England
- Coordinates: 50.46611°N 4.71676°W
- Grid reference: SX072664
- System: Station on heritage railway
- Operator: Bodmin and Wenford Railway
- Platforms: 2

History
- Former names: Bodmin
- Original company: Great Western Railway

Key dates
- 1887: Opened
- 1967: Closed to passengers
- 1983: Line closed
- 1990: Heritage service started
Location

Bodmin General railway station serves the town of Bodmin, in Cornwall, England. It was opened in 1867 as the terminus of the Great Western Railway's Bodmin branch line. It closed to passengers in 1967 but was remained in use for goods trains travelling along the branch until 1983. It reopened in 1986 as the principal station of the heritage Bodmin & Wenford Railway.

== History ==
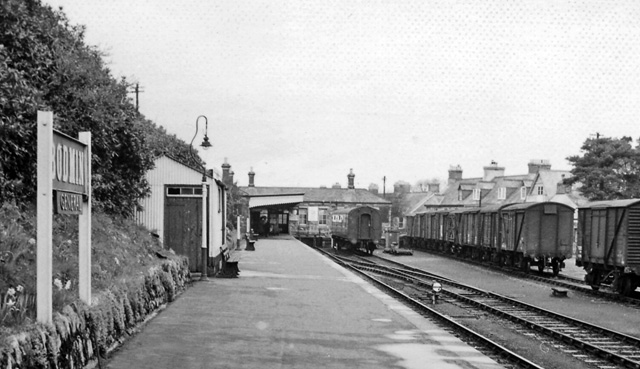
Bodmin General in 1964

The Great Western Railway (GWR) opened a 3-mile-43-chain (5.7 km) branch from the Cornish Main Line at Bodmin Road to Bodmin on 27 May 1887 (the terminus was known as just 'Bodmin' for many years). The branch was an isolated standard gauge line until the main line through Bodmin Road was converted from broad gauge in 1892. A 2-mile-56-chain (4.3 km) extension of the branch was opened from Bodmin station on 3 September 1888 to join with the Bodmin and Wadebridge Railway (B&WR) at Boscarne Junction. Bodmin remained a terminus, so trains running through had to reverse here and retrace their journey for a short distance before diverging at a junction outside the station.

The single platform at Bodmin was on the west side of the station while a goods yard with goods shed was on the east side. At the end of the passenger platform was a signal box and two sidings, one with an engine shed.

The former GWR 'Bodmin' station was renamed 'Bodmin General' on 26 September 1949 in order to distinguish it from Bodmin Road and the other Bodmin station (the former B&WR station) which became Bodmin North.

The engine shed closed in April 1962 and passenger services finished on 30 January 1967. Freight services were withdrawn on 1 May 1967 and the signal box closed on 17 December 1967. The line remained in use for freight trains to Wadebridge (until January 1979) and for china clay trains to Wenford. It was finally closed on 3 October 1983, a week after the last train ran from Wenford.

Preceding station	Historical railways	Following station
St Lawrence Platform	Great Western Railway; LSWR running powers	Bodmin Road

== Bodmin & Wenford Railway ==
The Great Western Society took a lease on the engine shed after British Rail no longer needed it. The main station building was a furniture store for while, but the goods shed was demolished in 1978. A Bodmin Railway Preservation Society was set up in 1984 and the Bodmin & Wenford Railway was established in 1985. Services to Bodmin Parkway (the former Bodmin Road station) started on 17 June 1990 and to Boscarne Junction on 14 August 1996.

A workshop was set up on the site of the former goods yard in 1987. A replacement signal box was provided in 1997. A new two track engine shed was built in 1999 on the site of the original shed. A second platform was opened in February 2020.

== Services ==
The Bodmin and Wenford Railway operates services that vary by day and each season.

Preceding station	Heritage railways	Following station
Boscarne Junction	Bodmin and Wenford Railway	Colesloggett Halt
