= Bagnall 0-4-0ST "Alfred" and "Judy" =

Two preserved British steam locomotives

Alfred and Judy
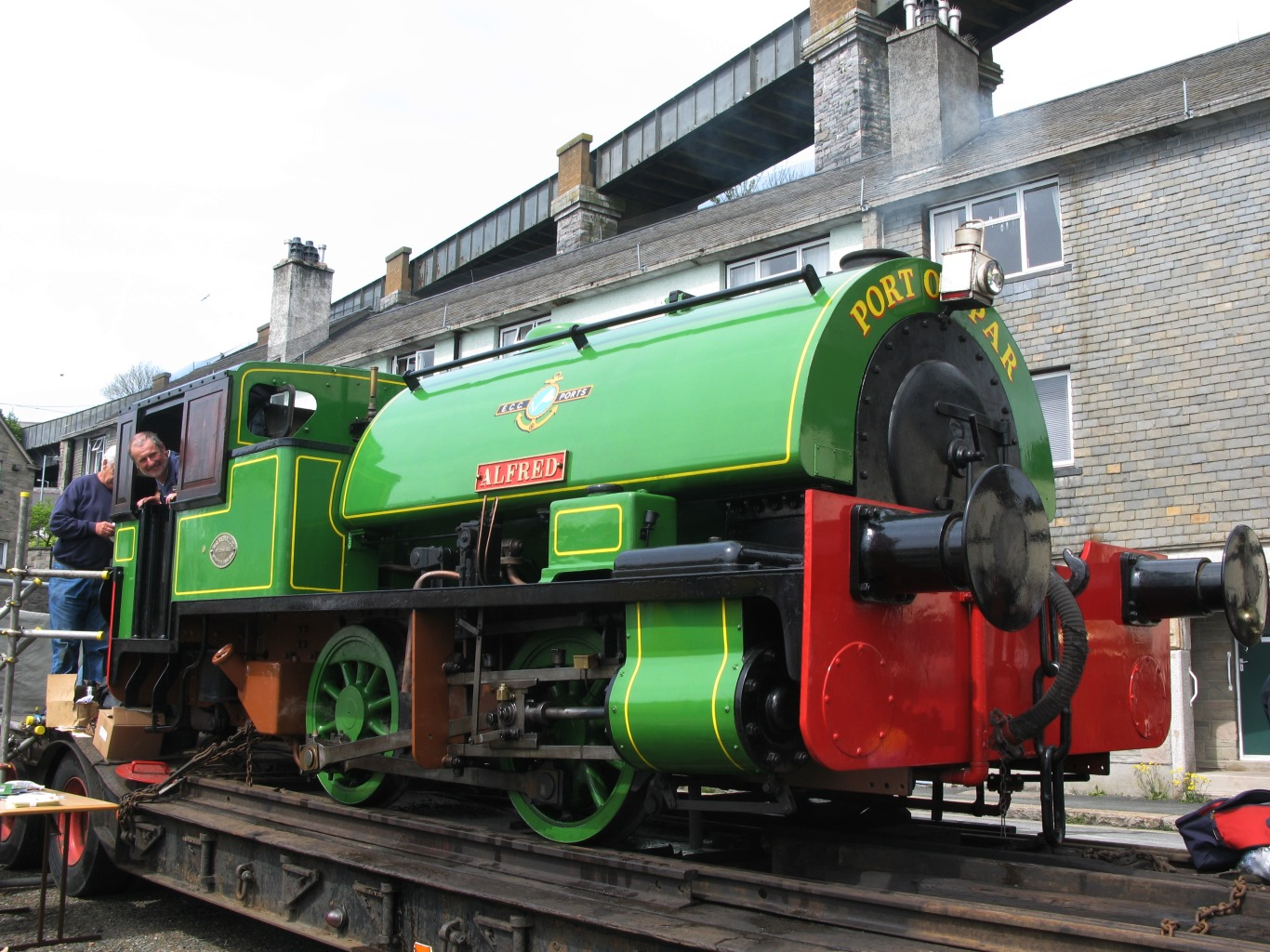
- Alfred on display by the Royal Albert Bridge
Type and origin
- Power type: Steam
- Builder: W. G. Bagnall
- Build date: 1937 (Judy); 1953 (Alfred)
- Total produced: 2
Specifications
- Configuration
  - Whyte: 0-4-0ST
- Gauge: 4 ft 8 1/2 in (1,435 mm)
- Driver dia.: 2 ft 9 in (840 mm)
- Wheelbase: 5 ft (1,500 mm)
- Cylinder size: 10 in × 16 in (250 mm × 410 mm) (bore × stroke)
Career
- Operators: English China Clays

Alfred and Judy are two 0-4-0 saddle tank steam locomotives. They were built by W. G. Bagnall for use at Par Docks in Cornwall, United Kingdom. The unusually low design was required to cope with extremely tight curves and a very low bridge under the Cornish Main Line. The locomotives are both preserved in operational condition on the nearby Bodmin and Wenford Railway and inspired the Reverend Wilbert Awdry to include them in The Railway Series of children's books as Bill and Ben.

== History ==
The first ships used Joseph Treffry's artificial harbour at Par on the south coast of Cornwall in 1833. It was fully operational by 1840, when it was linked to his inland mines and quarries by a canal up the valley to Ponts Mill, where it connected with inclined tramways to Treffry's copper mines and granite quarries. The canal was supplemented by a horse-drawn tramway to Ponts Mill in 1855, while a separate tramway incline served the Par Consols mine on the hill behind the harbour. In 1860, a connection was made to the recently opened Cornwall Railway which was carried on a viaduct and embankment between the harbour and mine. The mine closed in 1869 and the main tramway was converted to locomotive haulage as the Cornwall Minerals Railway in 1874, but wagons continued to be moved by horses within the harbour complex. Several years later a branch line was taken through an 8 feet (2.4 m) bridge beneath the Cornish Main Line to serve new china clay processing works. As well as the very low bridge, this line had a tight 70 feet (21 m) radius curve; these two restrictions had to be accounted for when buying locomotives to work at the harbour.

The first steam locomotive to be put to use by the Treffry Estates was a small four-wheeled vertical boiler locomotive built by Sara and Burgess in Penryn in 1912 that arrived at Par the following year. This was supplemented by a more conventional 0-4-0ST in 1916 named Punch, a second hand Manning Wardle engine. The Sara locomotive was taken out of service in 1927 and was replaced by a Sentinel engine known as Toby. This was another four-wheeled vertical boiler locomotive, but of a much more modern design than the one it replaced. In 1932, Punch was rebuilt by the harbour staff using the Sara boiler but it only operated in this form for five years. At around this time they created another locomotive at Par using the parts from two steam cranes that had been operating around the harbour.

A larger locomotive was ordered from W. G. Bagnall and delivered without a name in 1937; this was later christened Judy which continued the Punch and Judy theme, but the final locomotive was named Alfred after the manager of the harbour, Alfred Truscott. This locomotive, which arrived at Par in 1954, was another Bagnall 0-4-0ST similar to Judy.

The Treffry Estates leased the harbour to English China Clays (ECC) in 1946 and sold it outright to them in 1964. It was then operated as the Port of Par by ECC Ports. Toby was kept as a spare locomotive until it was withdrawn in 1957. Judy was taken out of traffic in 1969, but Alfred was kept in service until 1977. The connection to British Railways' Cornish Main Line was closed in 1965 and most of the sidings around the harbour were taken out of use, the main rail traffic that remained was china clay dried on the harbour that was moved out over the old tramway connection beneath Par Viaduct. This line is still in use but is now worked by DB Schenker locomotives from St Blazey.

== Judy ==
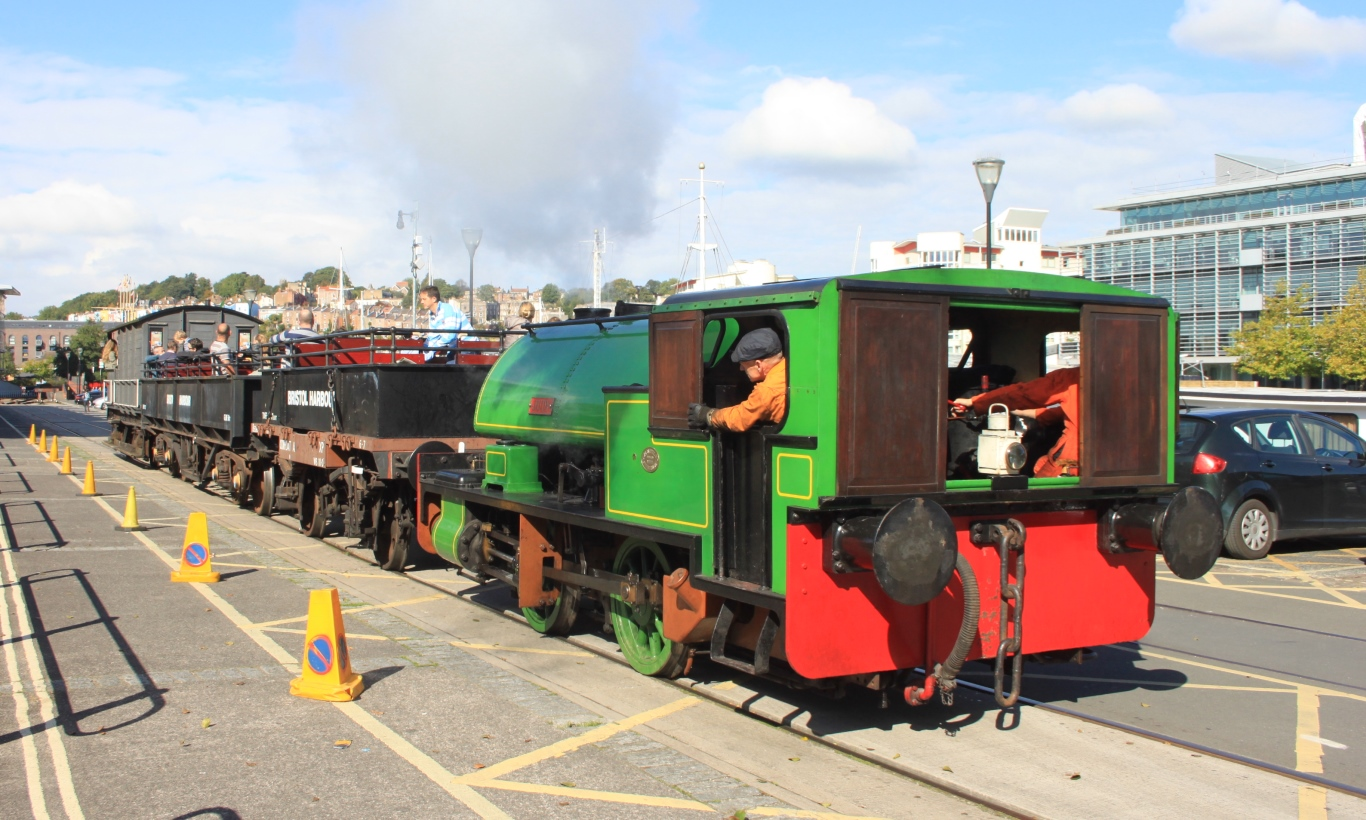
Judy while on loan to the Bristol Harbour Railway in 2015

Works number 2572, built 1937.

Bagnall designed a locomotive that was only 7 ft 6 in (2.29 m) high by dropping the cab floor down between the main frames. 16 ft 6 in (5.03 m) long over headstocks and 7 ft 5 in (2.26 m) wide, Judy's 2 ft 9 in (840 mm) wheels were just 5 feet (1,500 mm) apart, allowing it to negotiate the sharp curve by Par Moors drier. The outside cylinders meant it could be serviced without using an inspection pit, and Bagnall–Price valve gear was fitted. It cost £1,200 and weighed 16 long tons (16,000 kg) on delivery.

It was originally to be named Chough after the distinctive Cornish chough. The message was received by Bagnall's as Cough, which they thought was rather strange and thus sent it to Par without a nameplate. It was finally given nameplates reading Judy in 1960.

In 1969, it was withdrawn from service as the cost of boiler repairs was impractical given how little rail traffic was then handled at Par. Judy was kept in the engine shed until 1978, when it was moved to the china clay museum at Wheal Martyn near St Austell and displayed as a static exhibit alongside a locomotive from the Lee Moor Tramway in Devon.

In 2004, it was given to the Cornish Steam Locomotive Preservation Society (CSLPS). Before Judy could be moved from Wheal Martyn to their base at Bodmin General railway station, a specialist had to remove the asbestos insulation lining the boiler. A £50,000 grant was made from the Heritage Lottery Fund towards the restoration, and the work was supported by both Poltair Community School and the Cornwall Young Archaeologists Club.

Part of the firebox had to be renewed, this being the reason it was taken out of service at Par in 1969. One of the four axle journals were found to have suffered water damage while on static display but otherwise it was in reasonable condition despite being unused for more than 30 years. Heavy and specialised repairs were undertaken by contractors, but much of the work was done at Bodmin by volunteers. The boiler was steamed in June 2008 and Judy moved under its own power on 31 October 2008 for the first time in nearly 40 years. Now fitted with a vacuum brake so to operate passenger trains, Judy entered service on the Bodmin and Wenford Railway in April 2009.

== Alfred ==
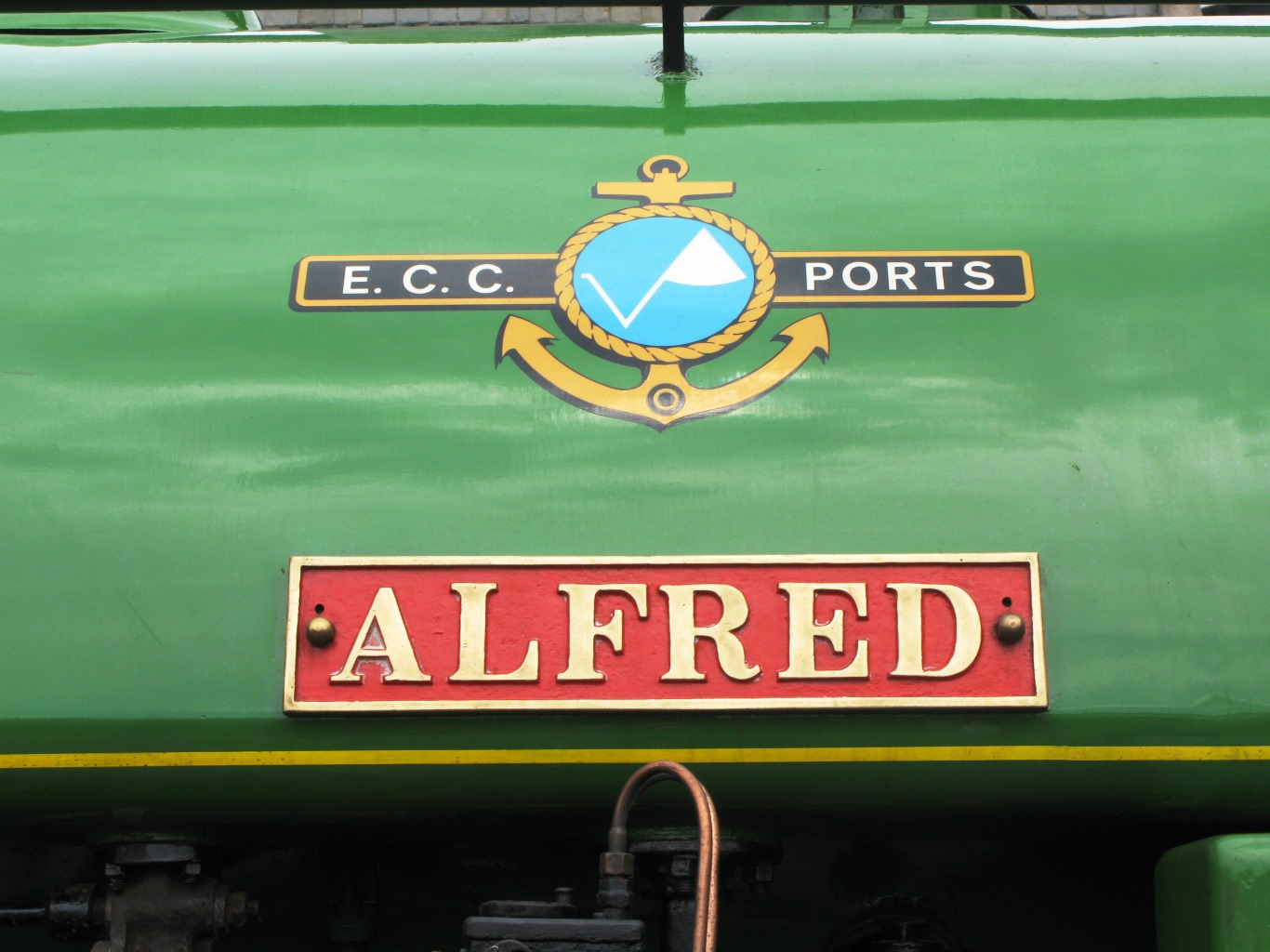

Works number 3058, built 1953.

Although essentially the same design, the second Bagnall locomotive had several small differences. These included flat handrail mountings instead of turned fittings, and a flush saddle tank without the prominent rivets used on Judy. It also weighed 560 pounds (250 kg) more.

No longer required for traffic at Par harbour in 1977, Alfred was moved to the CSLPS site at Bugle in 1978, where a vacuum brake was fitted so that it could haul passenger trains. In 1987, the CSLPS had to move, and so Alfred found a new home on the Bodmin and Wenford Railway. About ten years later it was repainted in yellow livery, the colour used by the fictional Bill and Ben who were inspired by Judy and Alfred, but it has now been repainted back into a green Port of Par livery with the lettering as carried from 1969 to 1977.

Alfred was always the wider-travelled of the two locomotives. In 1955, it spent a short period at Ponts Mill working in the china clay drier there while the regular locomotive was being serviced, the movement between Par harbour and Ponts Mill being made under its own power over British Railways tracks. In 1994, it was taken to Exeter for a rail fair celebrating the 150th anniversary of railways in that city. August 2002 saw it at St Blazey depot of an open day and it was steamed down the branch to Par harbour, the first time in 25 years. In May 2009 it was taken to Saltash as part of the 150th anniversary of the Royal Albert Bridge.

== Fictional counterparts ==
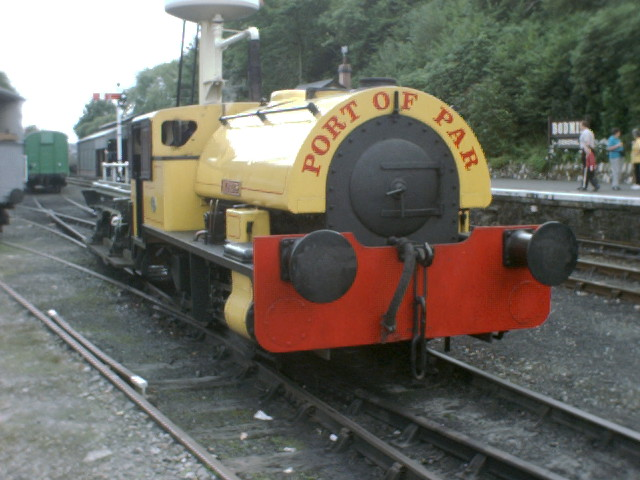
While at the Bodmin and Wenford Railway Alfred was painted for a time in the yellow colour used by Reverend Awdry in Main Line Engines

The Reverend Wilbert Awdry visited the Port of Par in 1966 and he soon wrote Main Line Engines, the 21st volume of The Railway Series of children's books. This book featured two diminutive low-cab 0-4-0STs named Bill and Ben. These locomotive characters have also appeared in the Thomas the Tank Engine and Friends television series based on the books.
