= Bodmin Parkway railway station =

Railway station in Cornwall, England

Bodmin Parkway Fordh Bosvena
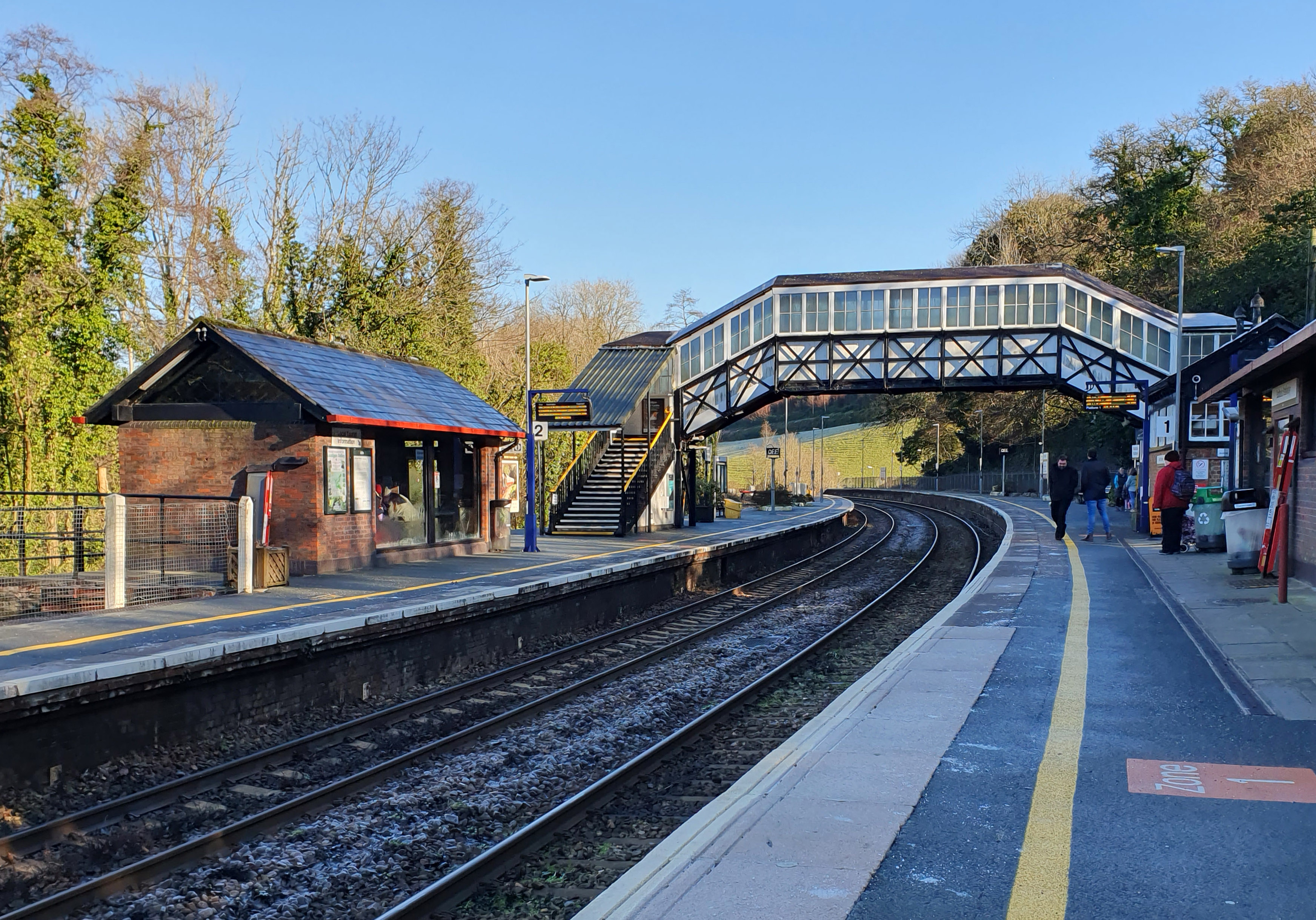
- The station, looking east

General information
- Location: St Winnow, Cornwall, England
- Coordinates: 50.4458°N 4.6630°W
- Grid reference: SX110640
- Manager: Great Western Railway
- Platforms: 3 (2 National Rail, 1 Bodmin & Wenford)

Other information
- Station code: BOD
- Classification: DfT category D

History
- Original company: Cornwall Railway
- Pre-grouping: Great Western Railway
- Post-grouping: Great Western Railway

Key dates
- 1859: Opened as Bodmin Road
- 4 November 1983: Renamed Bodmin Parkway

Passengers
- 2021/22: ▲0.230 million
- 2022/23: ▲0.261 million
- 2023/24: ▲0.280 million
- 2024/25: ▲0.305 million
- 2025/26: ▲0.325 million
Location
Notes
- Passenger statistics from the Office of Rail and Road

Bodmin Parkway railway station (Cornish: Fordh Bosvena) serves the town of Bodmin and nearby villages, in mid-Cornwall, England. It is located 3 miles (4.8 km) south-east of Bodmin, in the civil parish of St Winnow. The station lies on the Cornish Main Line, 274 miles 3 chains (274.0 mi; 441.0 km) from London Paddington, via Box and Plymouth Millbay. (Note: Network Rail records the distance from London Paddington to Bodmin Parkway as 252.50 miles.)

Great Western Railway manages the station and operates most services, along with CrossCountry. The Bodmin and Wenford Railway operates a heritage service on the branch to the town on certain days.

== History ==
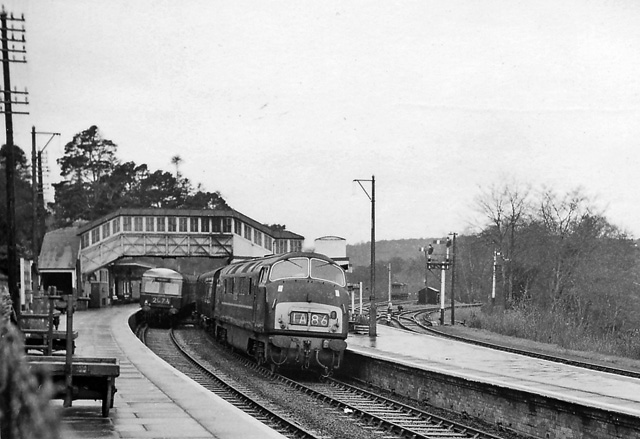
The station in 1964, when it was still known as Bodmin Road

Drawings held by Network Rail show that the Liskeard contract section of Cornwall Railway’s Plymouth to Falmouth scheme, within which Bodmin Road station was eventually situated, had reached the detailed design stage by June 1854. Original proposals to build a branch to Bodmin, then the most important town in Cornwall, failed as the company was unable to raise enough capital. Instead they opted for a station at a convenient point on their main line. The most suitable location lay within the Glynn Estate, but, as their agreement with Charles Crespigny Vivian, the landowner, forbade the construction of a station within his grounds, protracted negotiations were necessary before a new agreement could be reached.

When the railway opened on 4 May 1859, all that could be reported was that: "No station has yet been erected for Bodmin, owing to the site not having been immediately determined upon. It will be either near to Glynn Bridge or Respryn Bridge and, until it is completed, the Bodmin traffic will be accommodated at a temporary wooden shed erected near the latter place." Respryn was near the entrance to Lanhydrock House, the home of Thomas James Agar-Robartes, 1st Baron Robartes, a railway supporter.

The new station was finally ready to open on 27 June 1859 and was named Bodmin Road. Due to its remote location, the station master was paid five pounds by the Post Office to carry out the duties of postmaster. He also received a special lodging allowance until a house could be provided for him two years later. A goods shed was built in 1860 at the east end of the station, behind the platform for trains to Plymouth, and cattle pens were added the following year. A footbridge across the line was built by Mr Robartes in 1860 to enable visitors to reach Lanhydrock more easily; this was later replaced by a passage beneath the tracks. This path is still used by those visitors to this National Trust property who arrive by train.

Proposals were made in 1863 for a Bodmin, Wadebridge and Cornwall Junction Railway to connect the Cornwall Railway at Bodmin Road with the Bodmin and Wadebridge Railway at Bodmin, an isolated standard gauge line owned by the London and South Western Railway. An agreement was reached in 1864 for the Cornwall Railway to work the line once it was completed, and an Act of Parliament was obtained. Capital proved difficult to raise and so the scheme failed. The line was eventually built by the Great Western Railway, opening on 27 May 1887. The branch line served the rear of the up (eastbound) platform which meant that the goods shed had to be moved from that area to the opposite end of the station. Lord Robartes' footbridge was also in the way so was replaced by a new path under the railway near the goods shed. The main building, which was on the down platform, was extended and a covered footbridge provided between the platforms. The branch was a standard gauge line and so traffic from Bodmin to the Cornwall Railway had to be transferred at Bodmin Road until the broad gauge line was converted over the weekend of 21 May 1892.

The station was further rebuilt in 1896; the platform was lengthened and the goods yard enlarged goods yard were provided.

The Cornwall Railway was originally a single track 7 ft (2,134 mm) broad gauge line, but a passing loop at Bodmin Road allowed trains to pass. The railway company was amalgamated into the Great Western Railway on 1 July 1889. After the route had been narrowed to 4 ft 8 1/2 in (1,435 mm) standard gauge in 1892, work started to lay a second track. The second track westwards to Lostwithiel opened on 2 July 1893 and eastwards to Doublebois on 22 December 1893.

The Great Western Railway was nationalised into British Railways from 1 January 1948.

In 1958, John Betjeman, poet laureate from 1972 to 1984, wrote in a letter to his friend Peggy Thomas:

Perhaps we could all set up at Bodmin Road Station by arrangement with the Great Western – you in the refreshment room because of drink, Lynam in the signal box because of administrative ability, me in the booking office because I’m literary, Edward [Hornby] to do the lamps and odd jobs because he’s so clever with his hands, Douglas to look after the down platform as head porter and Ted as outside boy, pushing trolleys to Bodmin and meeting motor cars on arrival. We won’t have a station master, as we’ll be one glorious Soviet. Joan [Kunzer] will run the Bodmin branch.

By 1963, fears were growing that British Railways Board (BRB) was considering closing Bodmin Road station. It was not until the BRB published a public notice under the Transport Act 1962, entitled ‘'Withdrawal of Passenger Railway Services’', on 30 April 1964 that confirmation came that the station would remain open "to serve the North Cornwall area as a main line railhead." Goods facilities at Bodmin Road, however, were withdrawn, with the goods shed to the east of the station closing for business on 4 November 1963.

In 1969, St Merryn contractors R.C. Wilce and Sons demolished most of the late Victorian station buildings and replaced them with modern timber structures at a cost of £8,000. Bodmin Road was renamed Bodmin Parkway on 4 November 1983 and Wilce and Sons' station buildings were replaced by brick structures in 1989. In 2002/2003, a £500,000 Rail Passenger Partnership scheme saw the car park extensively improved and the ticket office block extended.

=== Heritage railway ===
The line to Bodmin General lost its passenger service on 30 January 1967, although goods traffic (primarily china clay) continued on the branch line until 20 November 1983. After this ceased, the line was taken over by the Bodmin and Wenford Railway and reopened as a heritage railway on 17 June 1990.

There is no booking office for the Bodmin and Wenford trains, so passengers buy their tickets from the guard. These trains use the opposite face of the platform used by main line trains towards Plymouth. The Bodmin line curves sharply away to the north at the west end of the platform; between this line and the main line is the exchange siding, used for occasional movements between the two railways, and a large modern carriage shed alongside that is used to store rolling stock for the Bodmin and Wenford Railway.

=== Signalling ===
The old signal box is now a café

When the Cornwall Railway opened, its trains were controlled by independently operated signals; there were no signal boxes, but an electric telegraph linked the stations so that the policemen who controlled the dispatch of the trains could communicate.

The signal box was fitted with a new locking frame in 1912 and was rebuilt c. 1928. The next signal box to the east was at Largin, and to the west was at Lostwithiel. A new signal box was opened on 31 January 1931 at Onslow Sidings (to serve a china clay works), 1.25 miles (2.01 km) towards Largin, but closed again on 10 November 1968. The signal box at Bodmin Road was itself closed on 30 May 1985, as was that at Largin on 14 December 1991.

The single track of the Bodmin branch was controlled by an electric train staff until 28 December 1950, after which an electric key token was used. Signalling on the branch was removed on 27 March 1968, after which points were operated by independent levers. The connection from the main line into the exchange siding is operated by a lever frame under the supervision of Lostwithiel signal box.

The signal box is a Great Western Railway Type 3 structure, dating from 1887, with stairs in two different styles. It was designated as a Grade II listed building in 2015.

=== Accidents and incidents ===
On 13 April 1895, the down passenger train from Plymouth derailed between Doublebois near milepost 271, about 3 mi (4.8 km) east of Bodmin Road. Both of the train's 0-4-4T locomotives (numbers 3521 and 3548) left the rails on a curve and dragged nearly the whole of the train with them. The lead engine slewed to the left onto the bank and the trailing engine to the right, across both lines at right angles to the train. There were no fatalities.

It is thought that the track had been damaged by the preceding train, the 10.15 Cornishman express from Paddington, headed by engines "similar in all respects." These engines had a reputation for rough riding, particularly at speed; according to the official accident report, the preceding train had almost certainly been speeding through the section based on the timings taken at Doublebois and Bodmin Road.

The accident report concluded it 'seemed only too probable' that the 'Cornishman' had damaged the track and led to the derailment of the following train. Following the derailment, this class of locomotives were barred from working in pairs.

== Facilities ==
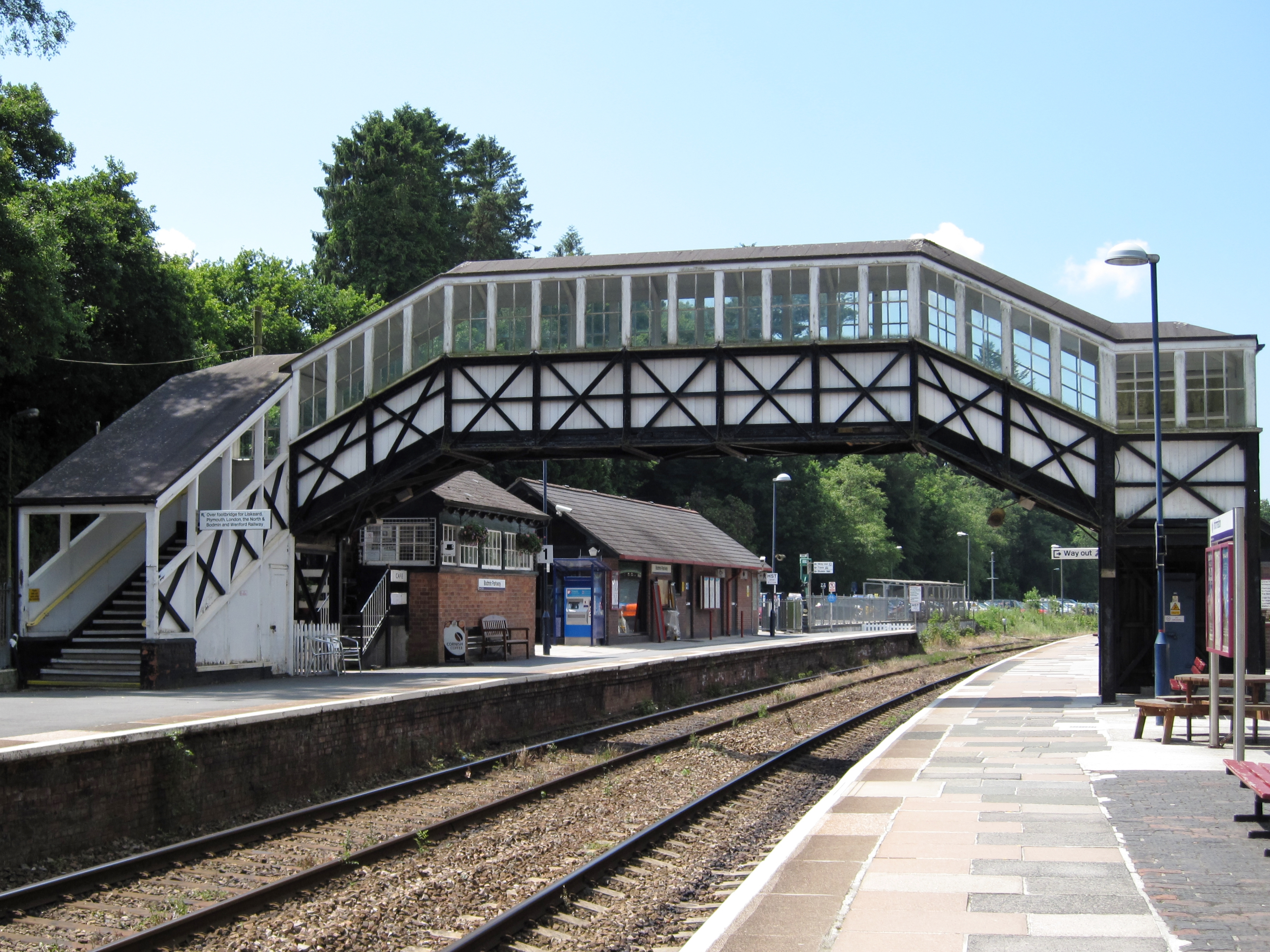
The footbridge

The entrance to the station is on the south-east side of the line, so the approach road from the road to Bodmin passes under the line north of the platforms. A footpath leads from the car park to Lanhydrock House, passing under the line at the west end of the station.

The brick-built Great Western Railway booking office is next to the entrance on the westbound platform, while a matching building on the opposite platform serves as a waiting room for passengers travelling towards Plymouth.

The former signal box now houses a café.

== Services ==
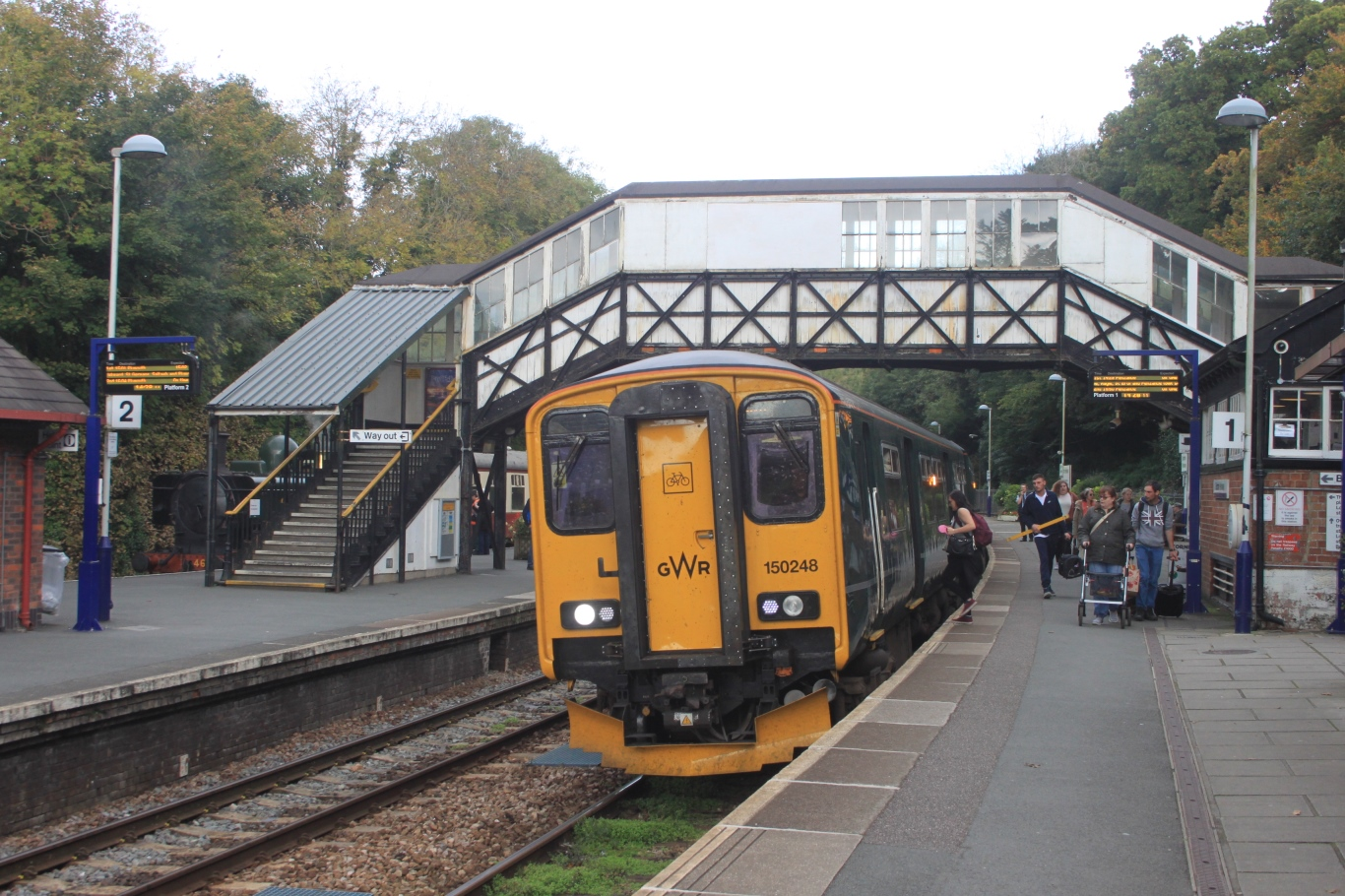
A GWR service to Penzance

Bodmin Parkway is served by two train operating companies, with the following general off-peak service pattern in trains per hour/day (tph/tpd):

Great Western Railway:

- 2 tph to Penzance
- 1 tp2h to Plymouth
- 1 tp2h to Exeter St Davids
- 1 tph to London Paddington (with occasional hours excluded)

Night Riviera overnight sleeper service:

- 1 tpd to Penzance
- 1 tpd to London Paddington.

CrossCountry:

- 2 tpd to Penzance
- 1 tpd to Birmingham New Street
- 1 tpd to Edinburgh Waverley.

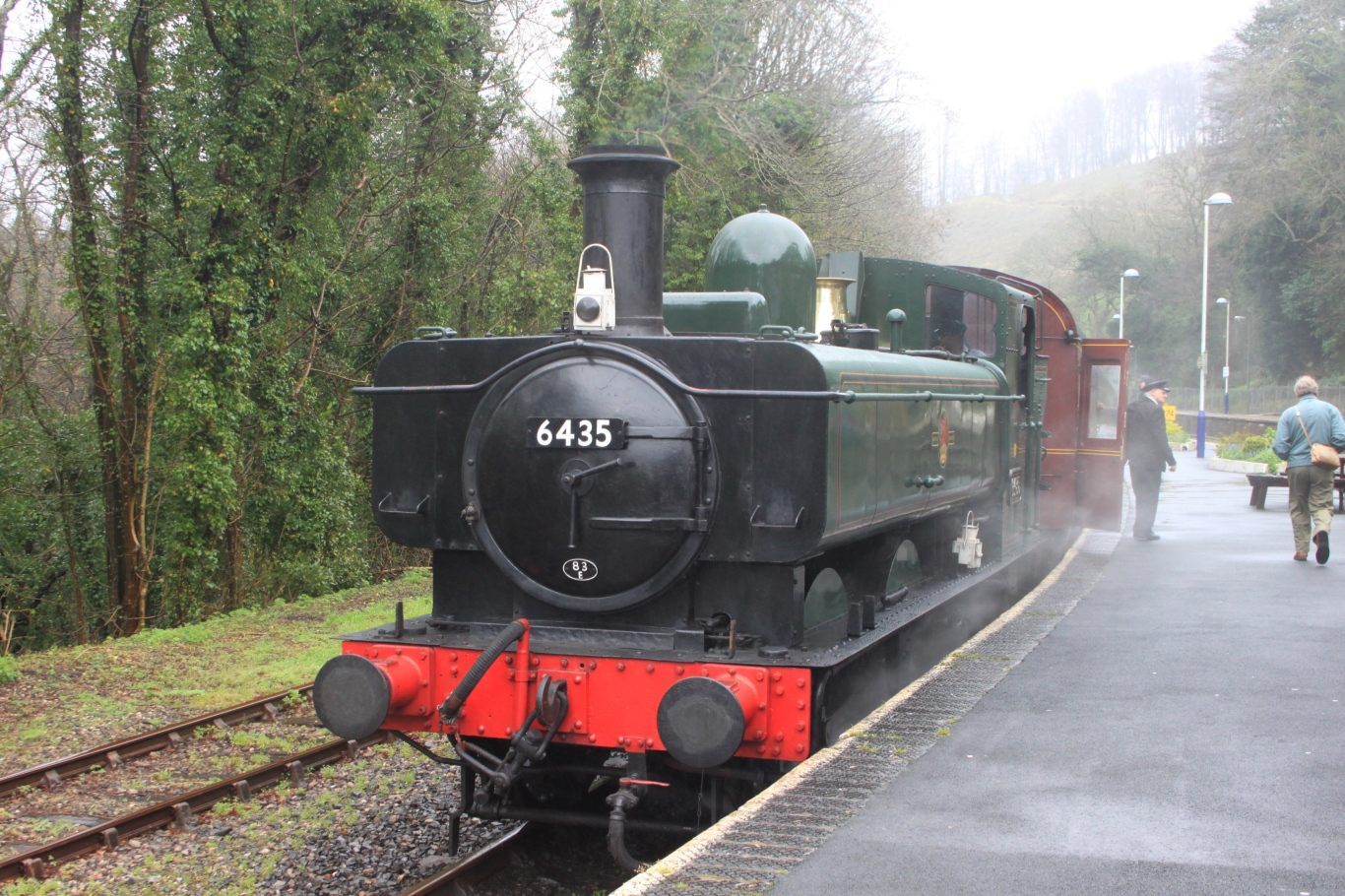
A heritage service to Bodmin General

The Bodmin and Wenford Railway operates services that vary by day and each season.

Preceding station	National Rail	Following station
Liskeard	Great Western Railway; Cornish Main Line	Lostwithiel
Liskeard	CrossCountry (Limited service west of Plymouth)	Par
	Heritage railways	
Colesloggett Halt	Bodmin and Wenford Railway	Terminus
	Historical railways	
Doublebois; Line open, station closed	BR Western Region; Cornish Main Line	Lostwithiel
Bodmin General	BR Western Region; Bodmin branch line	Terminus

== Onward bus connections ==
Go Cornwall Bus operates bus services to Bodmin, St Austell and Wadebridge from the small station car park departing every 15-20 minutes.
