= Colesloggett Halt railway station =

Railway station in Cornwall, England

Colesloggett Halt Gorta Kastellogos
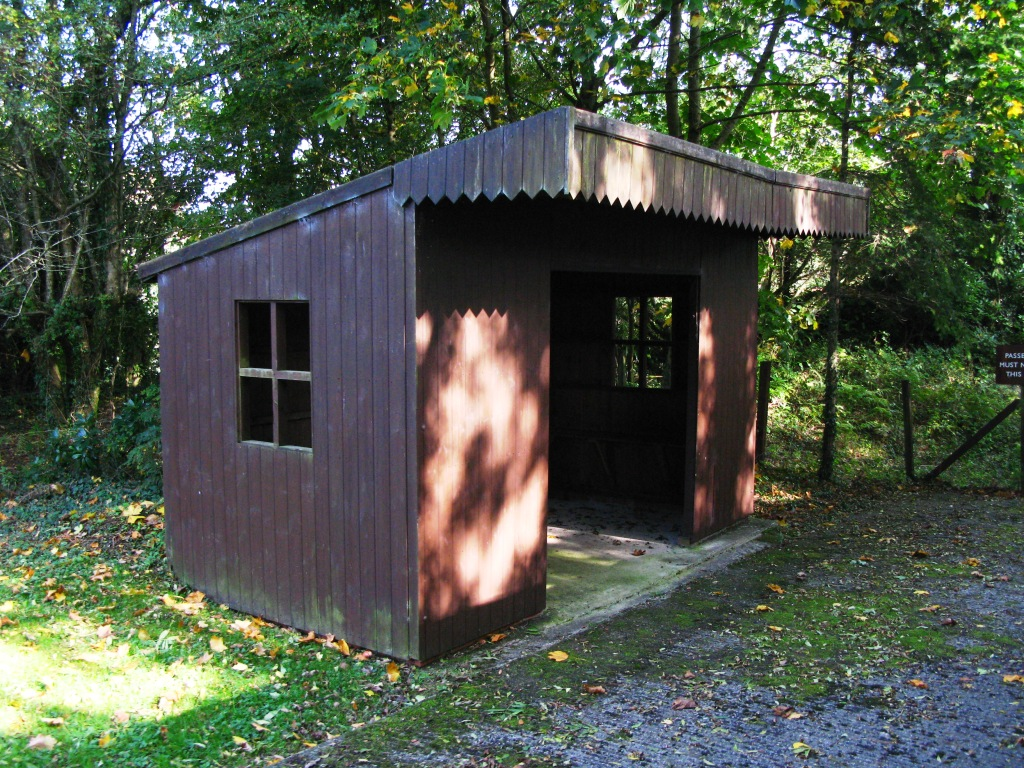

General information
- Location: Bodmin, Cornwall; England
- Coordinates: 50.45965°N 4.67418°W
- Grid reference: SX102656
- System: Station on heritage railway
- Operator: Bodmin and Wenford Railway
- Platforms: 1

History
- Original company: Bodmin and Wenford Railway

Key dates
- 1993: Opened
Location

Colesloggett Halt (Cornish: Gorta Kastellogos) is a small railway station on the Bodmin and Wenford Railway, a heritage railway in Cornwall, England, United Kingdom.

== History ==
The station was originally built in 1993 to serve a local farm park which closed as a visitor attraction shortly after the station was built. Today it serves primarily as an access to Cardinham Woods, a local beauty spot.

== Description ==
Colesloggett Halt consists of a single, short platform with a small station shelter. There is no car park.

== Services ==
Due to the very steep gradient on the line, services normally only call on the journey towards Bodmin Parkway.

Preceding station	Heritage railways	Following station
Bodmin General	Bodmin and Wenford Railway	Bodmin Parkway
