= Bodmin and Wenford Railway =

Heritage railway in Cornwall, England

Bodmin Railway
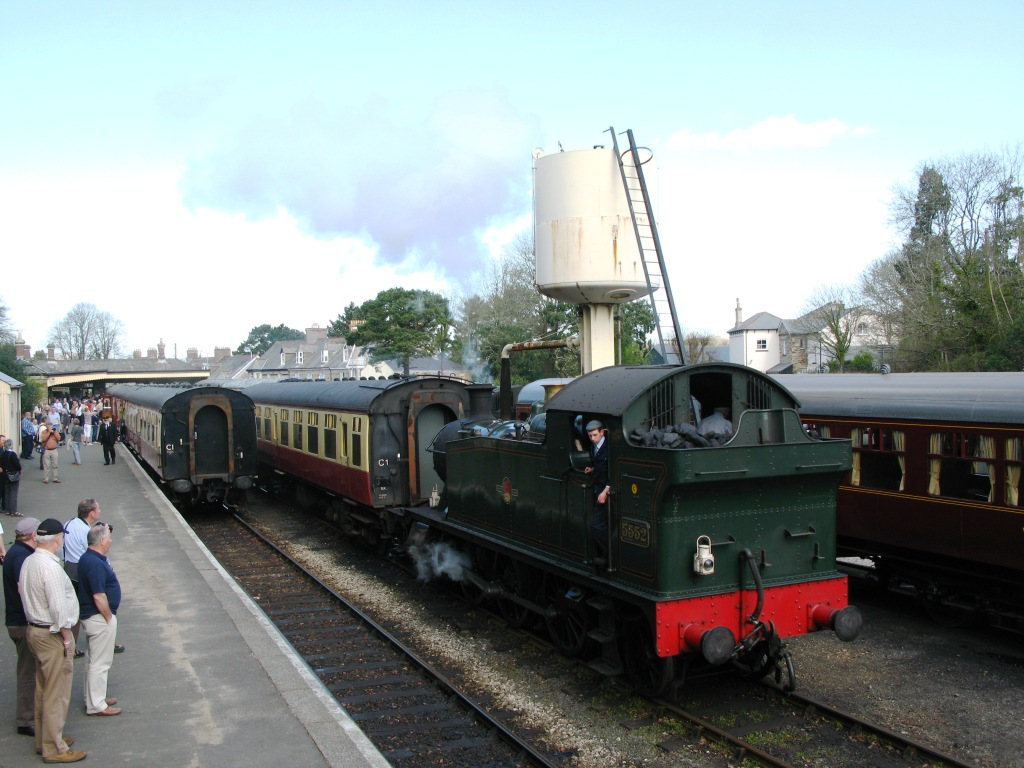
- Locale: Bodmin, England
- Terminus: Bodmin General

Commercial operations
- Name: Bodmin branch line
- Built by: Great Western Railway
- Original gauge: 4 ft 8 1/2 in (1,435 mm) standard gauge

Preserved operations
- Operated by: Bodmin and Wenford Railway
- Stations: 4
- Length: 6 mi 12 ch (9.9 km)
- Preserved gauge: 4 ft 8 1/2 in (1,435 mm) standard gauge

Commercial history
- Opened: 1887
- Closed: 1983

Preservation history
- 1986: short train rides from the station commenced
- 1990: Reopened to Bodmin Parkway
- 1993: Colesloggett Halt opened
- 1996: Reopened to Boscarne Junction
- Headquarters: Bodmin General

Website
- www.bodminrailway.co.uk

The Bodmin Railway is a 6 miles 12 chains (9.9 km) heritage railway at Bodmin in Cornwall, England. Its headquarters are at Bodmin General railway station and it connects with the national rail network at Bodmin Parkway.

The original line was opened in 1887 and 1888. Passenger trains were withdrawn in 1967 and freight traffic in 1983. Heritage trains started to operate in 1990. Most of the trains are typical of those that have operated in Cornwall and west Devon.

== History ==
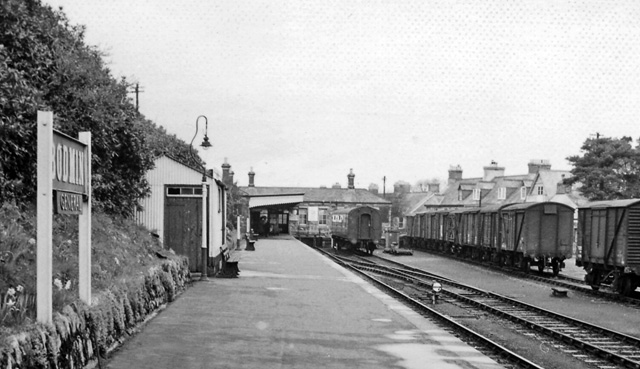
Bodmin General in 1964

The Cornwall Railway was authorised to construct a branch from its Plymouth to Falmouth main line but lack of funds prevented this. When the main line did open in 1859 the town of Bodmin was only served by Bodmin Road station which was nearly 4 mi (6 km) away. An independent Bodmin and Cornwall Junction Railway was authorised in 1864 to construct the branch but again, a lack of funds prevented the work.

The Great Western Railway (GWR) opened a branch line from Bodmin Road as far as its Bodmin station on 27 May 1887 and completed it on 3 September 1888 to Boscarne Junction where it connected with the Bodmin and Wadebridge Railway (B&WR). This had opened a line from its own Bodmin station to Wadebridge in 1834, although by 1888 it was operated by the London and South Western Railway (LSWR). This gave Wadebridge access to the main line for the first time as the LSWR's own route from Exeter through Launceston did not open until 1895.

Boscarne Junction gave the GWR access to the mineral branch line to Wenford. The principal traffic in later years was china clay which was mostly shipped out through south coast ports such as Fowey and Par, even though this required three reversals (at Boscarne, Bodmin and Bodmin Road).

Passenger services were withdrawn by British Rail (BR) on 30 January 1967 but freight continued to Wadebridge until 2 September 1978 and to Wenford until 3 October 1983. Before that happened, a siding had been opened at the Walker Lines Industrial Estate (near Bodmin General on the line to Bodmin Road) for Fulford Trumps who suppliers of agricultural equipment.

=== As a heritage railway ===
The Great Western Society leased the engine shed at Bodmin General from 1969. Its GWR 1361 Class locomotive 1363 was kept there and sometimes gave trips around the station area but was moved to their headquarters at Didcot Railway Centre in 1982.

After freight traffic ceased a Bodmin Railway Preservation Society was formed in 1984, their aim being to reopen the whole of the GWR line to Boscarne Junction. Shares were issued by the Bodmin and Wenford Railway plc in 1985 to finance the purchase and restoration of the line. The Cornish Steam Locomotive Society moved their trains from the Imperial Dry at Bugle to Bodmin in 1987. The North Devon Diesel Group brought their locomotives in 1988 but relocated to Torrington in 2008.

A light railway order was granted, the Bodmin Railway Centre Light Railway Order 1989 (SI 1989/1625). Services started on 17 June 1990 between Bodmin General and Bodmin Parkway (the new name of Bodmin Road since 1983) and a new station was opened at Colesloggett Halt on 17 April 1992. The line to Boscarne Junction reopened on 14 August 1996.

A workshop was erected at Bodmin General in 1987 using a structure from St Austell which was donated to the railway. A replica of the original signal box was built in 1997 re-using some components of Burngullow signal box and a two-road engine shed built in 1999 where the original one-road shed had been. A new shed was erected at Bodmin Parkway in 2007 to provide more under-cover storage for rolling stock.

The siding at Walker Lines was used from December 1989 until July 1991 for freight traffic dispatched by the Fitzgerald Lighting Company. This transhipment facility was on the site of the former Fulford Trumps siding with a three-way point relocated from Burngullow China Clay Dries. Trains were worked to Bodmin Parkway by Bodmin and Wenford Railway diesel locomotives where they were handed over to British Rail. Traffic was resumed in September 1996 with English, Welsh and Scottish Railway providing the main line haulage but ceased in July 2001 when EWS closed their wagonload network.

=== Proposed extensions ===
The Bodmin and Wenford Railway wanted to reopen the Wenford branch so that china clay could be moved from Wenfordbridge by rail. A separate company, Bodmin and Wenford Rail Freight Limited, was set up in 1992 but the line was not reopened. There were objections from cyclists as the route was now the Camel Trail cycle route and the china clay drier closed in 2002.

Attention has since changed to the route from Boscarne Junction towards Wadebridge, although this is also alongside the Camel Trail. The Bodmin and Wenford Rail Freight company was renamed as the Bodmin and Wadebridge Railway Company Limited in 2004 to facilitate this scheme. Initially referred to as 'The Wadebridge Trailway' it became the 'RailTrail' project in 2008. It was supported by the North Cornwall District Council but only by a single casting vote. There were objections from cyclists, environmentalists and some residents of Wadebridge. A bid for government funding was made in 2020.

£54,000 funding was secured from the Great Western Railway in 2019 to build a second platform at Bodmin General. This would allow the railway to operate additional trains.

== Route ==
The railway is 6 miles 12 chains (9.9 km) long and climbs about 300 ft (91 m) on gradients as steep as 1 in 37.

=== Bodmin Parkway ===
Located at 50.4461°N 4.6627°W, 3 mi 41 ch (5.7 km) from Bodmin General.

Opened by the Cornwall Railway in 1859 as 'Bodmin Road', it was rebuilt when the Bodmin line opened in 1887. It was renamed 'Bodmin Parkway' in 1983. Trains to Bodmin depart from their own platform on the north side of the station. A siding at the west end connects the Bodmin line with the main line, movements being controlled from a ground frame. Just outside the station the Bodmin line crosses the River Fowey on a 79 yd (72 m) viaduct.

=== Colesloggett Halt ===
Located at 50.4599°N 4.6745°W, 2 mi 27 ch (3.8 km) from Bodmin General.

This platform, on the east side of the line, was opened in 1992 to serve Bodmin Farm Park which has since closed but it also gives access to Cardinham Woods.

=== Bodmin General ===
Located at 50.4662°N 4.7168°W.

This is the headquarters of the Bodmin and Wenford Railway. The original platform is on the west side of the line with the station buildings at the end beyond the buffer stop. The Great Western Railway engine shed and signal box were demolished in the late 1970s but replacements have been built, the signal box being a replica of the original. A workshop has also been built on the site once occupied by the goods shed.

=== Boscarne Junction ===
Located at 50.4740°N 4.7614°W, 2 mi 61 ch (4.4 km) from Bodmin General.

The junction was the site of exchange sidings from 1888. A small wooden platform was provided from 1964 to allow passengers to connect with a shuttle service to Bodmin North. A new stone platform was built for the heritage trains in 1996. The Camel Trail runs along the north side of the site.

== Rolling stock ==
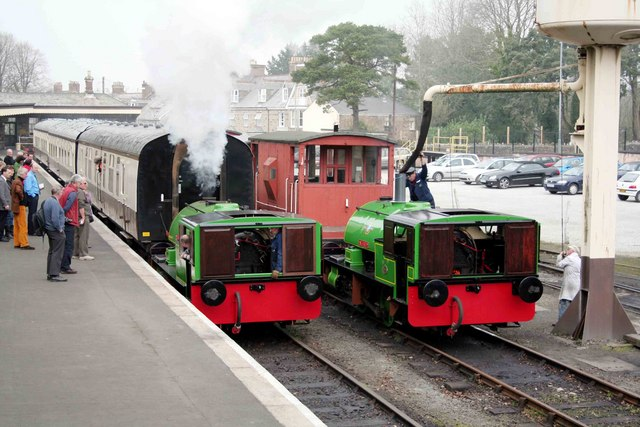
Alfred and Judy at Bodmin General shunting passenger coaches and heritage goods wagons

Most of the locomotives operating on the Bodmin and Wenford Railway are Great Western Railway steam locomotives and British Rail diesels typical of those that have operated in Cornwall and west Devon. There are also shunting locomotives typical of military and industrial sites in the area including Alfred and Judy, two low height 0-4-0STs which were specially constructed by W. G. Bagnall for the Port of Par.

Passenger trains are mostly formed from British Rail Mark 1 coaches but some Great Western Railway coaches are also used.

Heritage goods wagons include several examples of open wagons that had been built by British Rail to carry china clay in Cornwall. Other wagons are used to maintain the railway and its equipment. The oldest item is a ganger's pump trolley dating from when the London and South Western Railway owned the Bodmin and Wadebridge line. It used to be kept in a shed at Dunmere Junction.
