= Par Docks =

China clay port in Cornwall

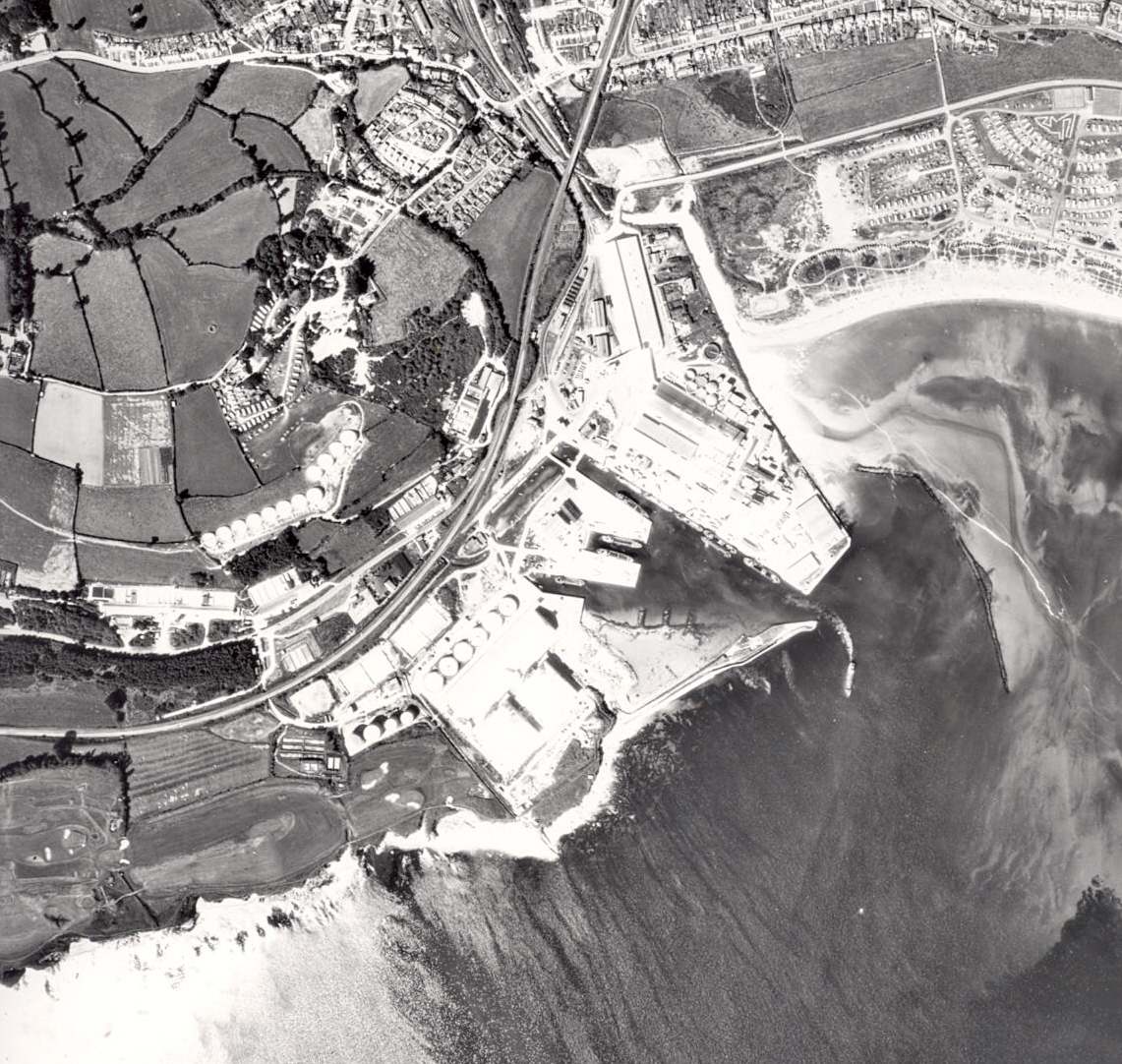
- Aerial photograph of Par Docks

Location
- Location: Par, Cornwall
- Coordinates: 50°20′40″N 4°42′20″W

Details
- Owner: Imerys
- Opened: 1840

Par Docks is an Imerys-owned harbour in the village of Par, Cornwall, England, United Kingdom, which was used for the export of china clay from the numerous Imerys sites in the clay-rich region of Mid-Cornwall.

== History ==
Joseph Treffry (born Joseph Austen in 1782) was the owner of the Fowey Consols mine and wanted a harbour to export copper and import coal. He started work on a harbour in the small cove of Porth in 1829. The first ships used it in 1833 and it was finished in 1840. The breakwater enclosed 36 acres (15 hectares) of harbour and was capable of taking up to about 50 vessels of 200 tons each. The port is tidal so the vessels would sit on the bottom at low tide. Cornish granite was exported from Par in the early days for such famous landmarks as Waterloo Bridge in London, Chatham Docks, Gibraltar Docks & Glasgow Docks. As the china clay industry grew in the area during the 19th century this became the main export through the docks.

According to the Imerys Blueprint For Cornwall published in 2003:

1858 – 15,154 tons of china clay went out through Par

1885 – 86,325 tons

1987 – 700,000 tons

2002 – 313,425 tons + 134,810 tons of aggregates

Treffry Estates sold the harbour to English China Clay (ECC) in 1964 having leased it to them since 1946. In the 1950s and 1960s, vast dryers were built on-site. The current Grade Dryer was built in 1996. In 2007 the port and some of the clay dries (those dealing with clay for the paper industry) closed with the loss of 200 jobs. All shipping for clay now goes to Fowey. The port is still the site of a Milling Centre and a Grade Dryer and this continued industrial usage means ECO-BOS's ideas for a marina and residential Eco-village on the dis-used dryer site to the west of the docks is unlikely to come to fruition. The port is used by vessels servicing the St Austell Bay Mussel Farm.

=== The Stack ===
The port was famous for its "Stack" – the chimney of a lead smelter that had to be demolished in 1907 after it was hit by lightning – and for its low-roofed engines Alfred & Judy (Bagnall 0-4-0ST), the inspiration for Bill & Ben in Rev W Awdry's children's books about Thomas the Tank Engine after his visit to the docks in 1966. The port is still served by a rail line from St Blazey and still has the occasional early morning train. The old St Blazey to Fowey railway closed in 1968 and was turned into a haul road for the clay lorries delivering to the port of Fowey. They access this haul road on the Docks site.

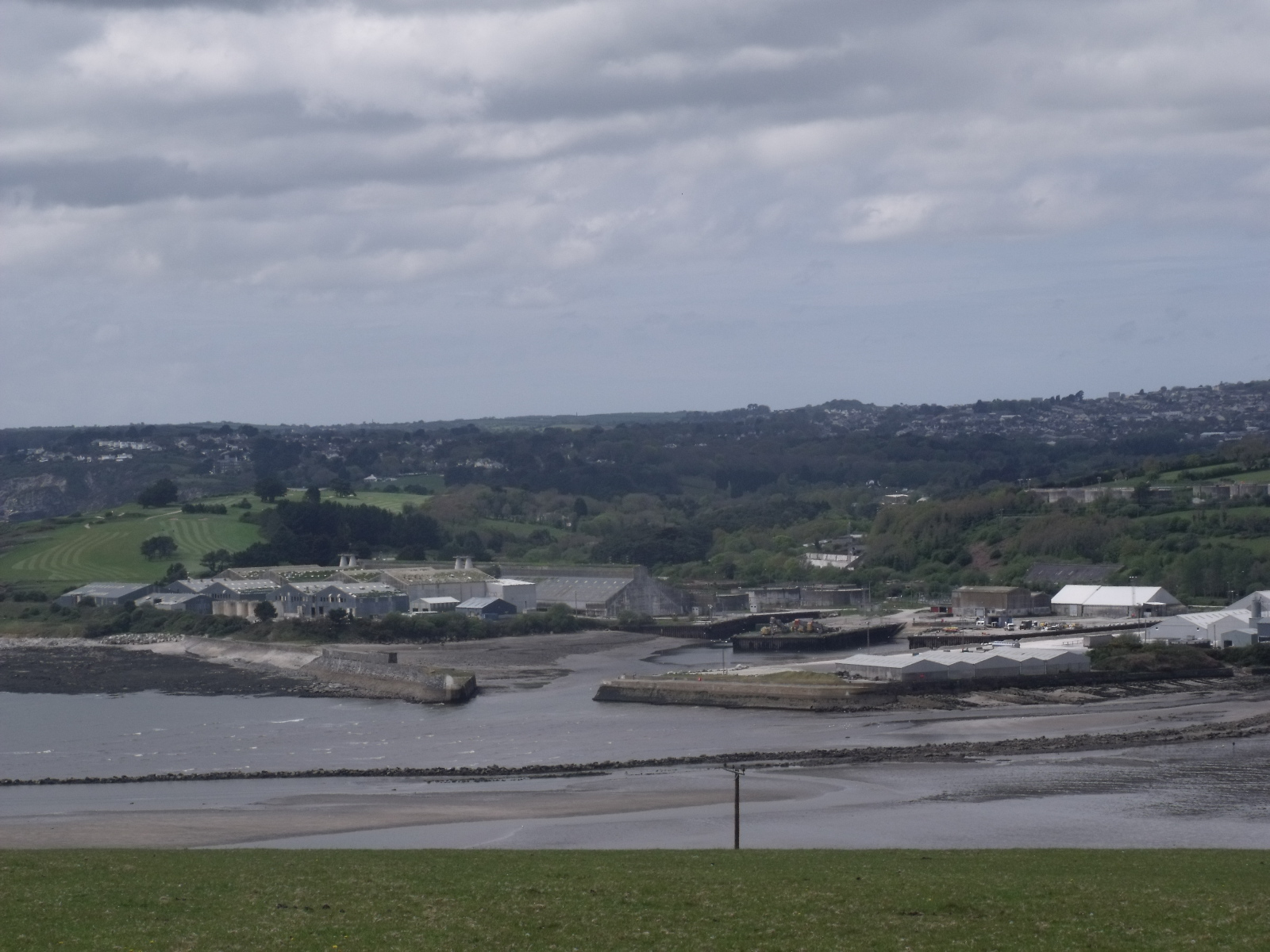
Par Docks at low tide.
