= Wenfordbridge =

Hamlet in Cornwall, England

Coordinates: 50.544813°N 4.704401°W

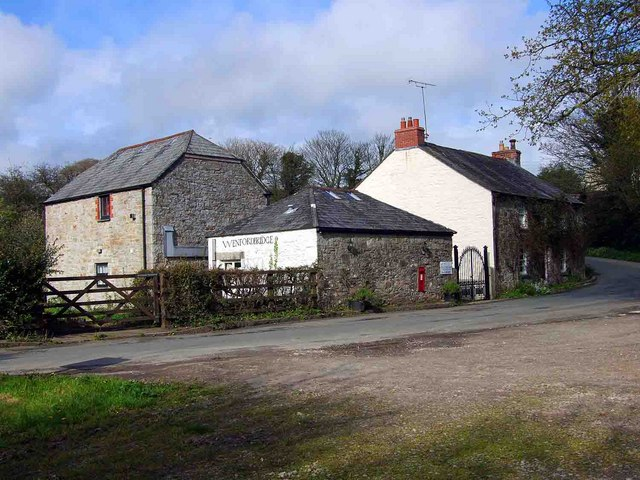
The hamlet of Wenfordbridge

Wenford Bridge Pottery

Wenfordbridge, or Wenford Bridge, is a hamlet some 6 miles (9.7 km) north of Bodmin and on the western flank of Bodmin Moor, in Cornwall, England. It takes its name from an old granite bridge over the River Camel, and lies on the border between the parishes of St Breward and St Tudy.

Wenford Bridge was the terminus of a former railway line from Wadebridge that was originally built by the Bodmin and Wadebridge Railway in 1834. The line was built in order to facilitate the transport of sea sand for agricultural use from the estuary of the Camel to the local farms, and never carried passengers. Other traffic included granite and china clay from local quarries, and the line survived to carry the latter until 1983. Today the route of the line forms part of the Camel Trail, a recreational route for walkers, cyclists and horse riders.

== Pottery ==
The influential studio potter Michael Cardew purchased the inn at Wenford in 1939 and converted it to a pottery where he produced earthenware and stoneware pottery. After his death his son Seth Cardew carried on the tradition until 2005 when he relocated to Spain.

== Cornish wrestling ==
Cornish wrestling tournaments, for prizes, have been held at Wenfordbridge.

== The bridge at Wenfordbridge ==
The bridge over the River Camel at Wenfordbridge is Grade II listed; it is one of six listed bridges on the river, the largest number of listed bridges on any Cornish river.
