= Bodmin and Wadebridge Railway =

Former railway line in Cornwall, UK

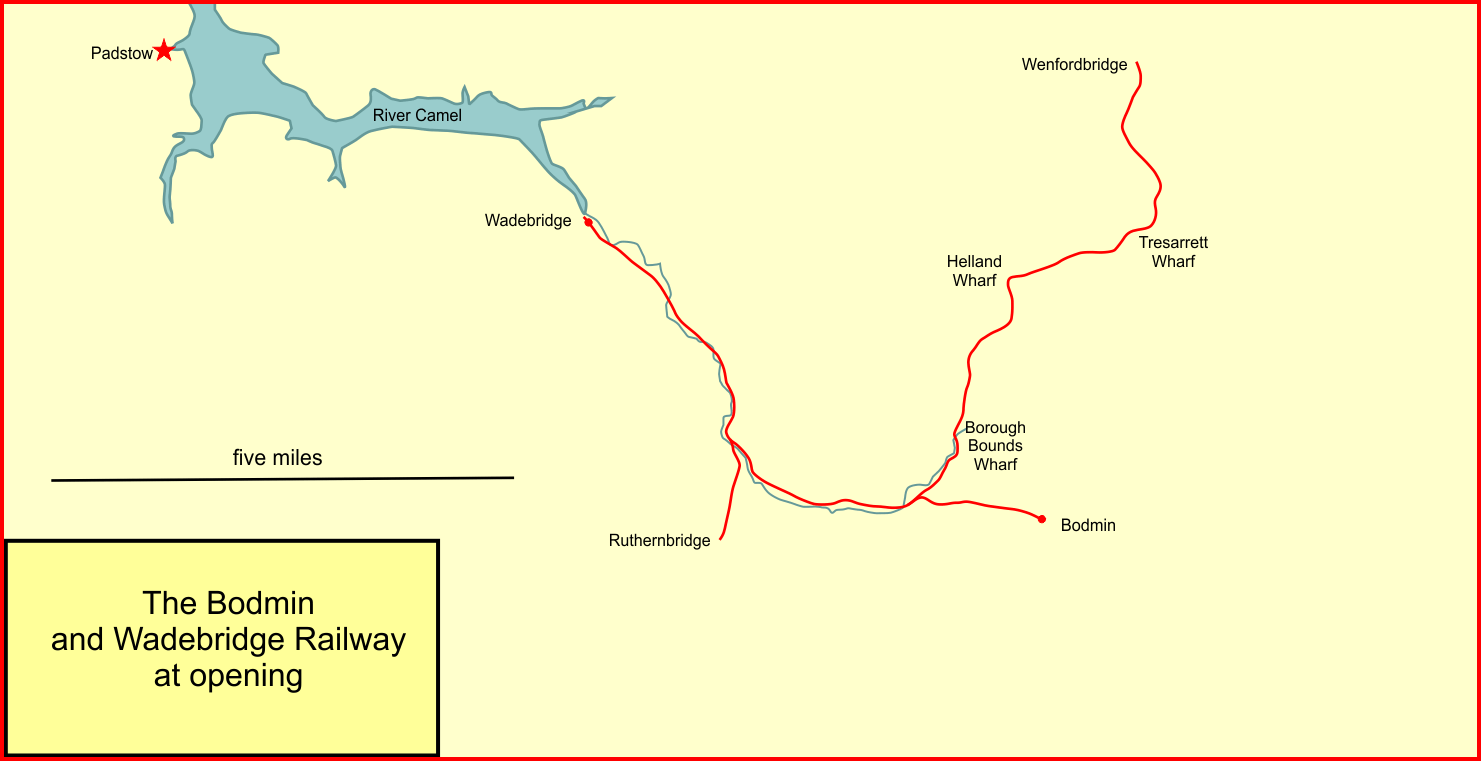
- Map of Bodmin & Wadebridge System in 1834

Overview
- Headquarters: Wadebridge
- Locale: South West England
- Dates of operation: 1834–1978
- Successor: London & South Western Railway

Technical
- Track gauge: Standard

The Bodmin and Wadebridge Railway was a railway line opened in 1834 in Cornwall, England, United Kingdom. It linked the quays at Wadebridge with the town of Bodmin and also to quarries at Wenfordbridge. (Note: Sources use Wenfordbridge and Wenford Bridge interchangeably, but the current Ordnance Survey 1:50 000 maps cite the name as a single word) Its intended traffic was minerals to the port at Wadebridge and sea sand, used to improve agricultural land, inwards. Passengers were also carried on part of the line.

It was the first steam-powered railway line in the county and predated the main line to London by 25 years.

It was always desperately short of money, both for initial construction and for actual operation. In 1847 it was purchased by the London and South Western Railway, when that company hoped to gain early access to Cornwall for its network, but in fact those intentions were much delayed, and the little line was long isolated.

China clay extraction was developed at Wenfordbridge and sustained mineral traffic on the line for many years, but passenger use declined and the line closed to passengers in 1967, the china clay traffic continuing until 1978.

Much of the route now forms part of the Camel Trail, a cycle and footpath from Wenfordbridge to Padstow.

== Origins ==
Bodmin and Wadebridge Railway Act 1832
- Act of Parliament
- Parliament of the United Kingdom
- Long title: An Act for making and maintaining a Railway from Wadebridge in the Parish of Saint Breoke to Wenford Bridge, Saint Breward, with a collateral Branch to the Borough of Bodmin, and certain other Branches, all in the County of Cornwall.
- Citation: 2 & 3 Will. 4. c. xlvii

Dates
- Royal assent: 23 May 1832

Text of statute as originally enacted

Local interests obtained an act of Parliament, the Bodmin and Wadebridge Railway Act 1832 (2 & 3 Will. 4. c. xlvii) to construct the Bodmin & Wadebridge Railway from metal ore mines near Wenford to the port at Wadebridge for onward transport by coastal shipping. Sea sand, then used for improving agricultural land, was also to be brought up from Wadebridge. The line was also to have a branch to Bodmin and also a one-mile branch to Ruthern Bridge.

The line was formally opened on 30 September 1834 although trial operation, conveying revenue passengers and minerals had taken place in July. The permanent way consisted of 15 foot parallel (Note: As opposed to fish bellied rails) rails 42 lbs per yard on stone blocks 20 inches square. The railway used standard track gauge.

At first there was only one locomotive, called "Camel", a single passenger coach, and desperately few wagons, but a second engine, called "Elephant" was obtained from June 1836.

The passenger service only ever operated between Bodmin and Wadebridge, and never on the branches; there were no intermediate stations, but boarding at any intermediate place was semi-officially permitted and passengers were carried in the tool van on both the Ruthernbridge and Wenfordbridge branches.

The train service seems to have been very irregular, probably because of mechanical problems with the locomotives, and for many years (probably from 1841) the passenger service consisted of a train from Wadebridge on Mondays, Wednesdays and Fridays, returning on the other weekdays.

Minerals and goods were the dominant traffic, and there were numerous wharves—the company used the term borrowed from canal operation, and the person in charge of each wharf was a wharfinger.

Wharves and siding connections were at: (Note: Possibly at other locations also)

- Ruthern Bridge; a goods and mineral terminus on its own branch; this served small mines for copper, lead and iron;
- Denby Siding; near the later Nanstallon Halt; serving an iron mine;
- Borough Bounds Wharf, later also known as Dunmere Wharf; on the Wenfordbridge side of Boscarne Junction; grain to Hawke's Mill;
- Penhargard Siding, mainly used for timber;
- Helland Wharf;
- Tresarratt Quarry;
- Parkyn's Stump Oak;
- Tresarratt Wharf;
- Wenfordbridge

Although export of granite and the carriage of sea sand grew in volume, passenger traffic remained insignificant, and the line remained hopelessly weak financially, and a series of disasters including serious floods which damaged bridges and culverts, wiped out any small operating profit. One notable flood was that of Sunday 25 July 1847 when two bridges were swept away, the event being reported as far away as London.

== Takeover ==
In the period from 1835, business interests in the Falmouth area were concerned to regenerate that town's waning importance, and railway connection to London was in their thoughts. Several proposals came forward and failed, but a scheme called the Cornwall & Devon Central Railway gained support for a standard gauge line following an inland route, forming an alliance with other lines to get access to London over the London and South Western Railway. The Cornwall and Devon Central company had yet to get an act of Parliament giving legal powers for construction, but it purchased the Bodmin and Wadebridge line for £35,000.

In fact the C&DC lost out in its bid for approval for its line, and the London & South Western company itself purchased the Bodmin and Wadebridge line for the same £35,000 from the C&DC company in 1847. The LSWR now owned a heavily loss-making little line more than a hundred miles from its own network. The purchase did not have authority in any act of Parliament, and the purchase is often described as illegal. In fact the activities of companies incorporated by act of Parliament were limited by the terms of the act, and the LSWR did not have the power to acquire another railway company; their action in doing so would better be described as ultra vires.

Notwithstanding the remoteness of the new owner, the LSWR brought financial resources to bear and the local line continued its operations with a little more certainty than previously, while still making considerable losses. However the Bodmin and Wadebridge continued to play a role in the battle between the LSWR and its allies, and the GWR and its satellites.

Several nominally independent companies sought support and statutory powers for lines connecting with the Bodmin and Wadebridge; among these was the Launceston, Bodmin and Wadebridge Railway, which obtained powers in the Launceston, Bodmin, and Wadebridge Junction Railway Act 1864 (27 & 28 Vict. c. cclxxxix) but never succeeded in using them.

In 1873 the Devon and Cornwall Railway, a narrow gauge company, tried to obtain parliamentary authority to make extensions in the two counties in its name, including a railway from near Okehampton to Wenfordbridge, so as to gain access to Wadebridge; but this was rejected in Parliament.

A new halt, called Shooting Range Platform, was opened about 1880. It was long enough for a single coach, located on the south-west side of the line; the shooting range was in the otherwise inaccessible land between the railway and the loop of the River Camel, opposite Derry's Wood. Trains stopped there only with written authority from the Army.

The North Cornwall Railway Act 1882 (45 & 46 Vict. c. ccliv) authorised the North Cornwall Railway to build a line from Padstow via Wadebridge to Halwill, where the LSWR now had its line; running arrangements for the North Cornwall trains as far as Okehampton were agreed. The North Cornwall Company had wanted running rights as far as Exeter, but by now the LSWR sought friendlier terms with its rival, the GWR, and to avoid offending them, the powers were stopped short at Okehampton. There was to be a triangular junction at Pendevy Bridge, the point where the new Halwill line met the Bodmin & Wadebridge, a little east of Wadebridge, and the act included powers to improve the Bodmin & Wadebridge line, including the making of seven deviations to eliminate the very sharp curves on the line.

In fact, by the South Western Railway (Various Powers) Act 1883 (46 & 47 Vict. c. clxxxix) the LSWR took over the role of making those improvements, and on 1 July 1886 the LSWR formally absorbed the Bodmin and Wadebridge line, the previous semi-legal purchase now being authorised by the South Western Railway Act 1886 (49 & 50 Vict. c. cx) of 25 June 1886.

== The GWR arrives in Bodmin ==
The Great Western Railway had formed an alliance with other broad gauge railway companies in the West of England: the grouping was called the Associated Companies. In 1876 they amalgamated under the banner of the Great Western Railway, and that company pursued an active interest in developing railways in Cornwall. In earlier years the Associated Companies and the so-called narrow gauge companies—the LSWR and its allies—were hostile to one another, but now the enmity was abating.

An earlier proposal had been made to make a broad gauge line from the Cornwall Railway near Bodmin Road station to the Bodmin and Wadebridge station at Bodmin, with interchange platforms for the necessary transshipment from broad to standard gauge wagons there. This had been authorised by the Bodmin Railway Act 1864 (27 & 28 Vict. c. clxx), but was dropped in 1876.

By 1882 relations between the GWR and the LSWR had improved enough for constructive discussions to take place about connecting the GWR to Wadebridge, and to improve the Bodmin and Wadebridge line itself. (The line had been constructed with very sharp curves and lightly constructed track.) The Great Western Railway Company got powers to make a standard gauge connection, (Note: By then it was obvious that the days of the broad gauge were numbered) and on 27 May 1887 the GWR opened a line from Bodmin Road to its own Bodmin station in the town. The station later became known as Bodmin General.

In the following year, on 3 September 1888 the GWR built an extension from their Bodmin station to join the Bodmin and Wadebridge line, at Boscarne Junction.

The LSWR now suspended its own passenger trains on the Bodmin and Wadebridge line from 1 November 1886 for the improvements to the line to be undertaken; goods trains were also suspended, and Great Western Railway trains were the only ones on the line, running from their own Bodmin station. Yet another act of Parliament was required, the South-western Railway Act 1891 (54 & 55 Vict. c. cxxi), to permit extension of time for these works, which still included the substantial easing of the sharp curves at Grogley and Dunmere, and substantial improvement of the whole of the section from Boscarne Junction to Bodmin (B&WR station), and extension of Wadebridge station.

== Integration with the LSWR lines ==
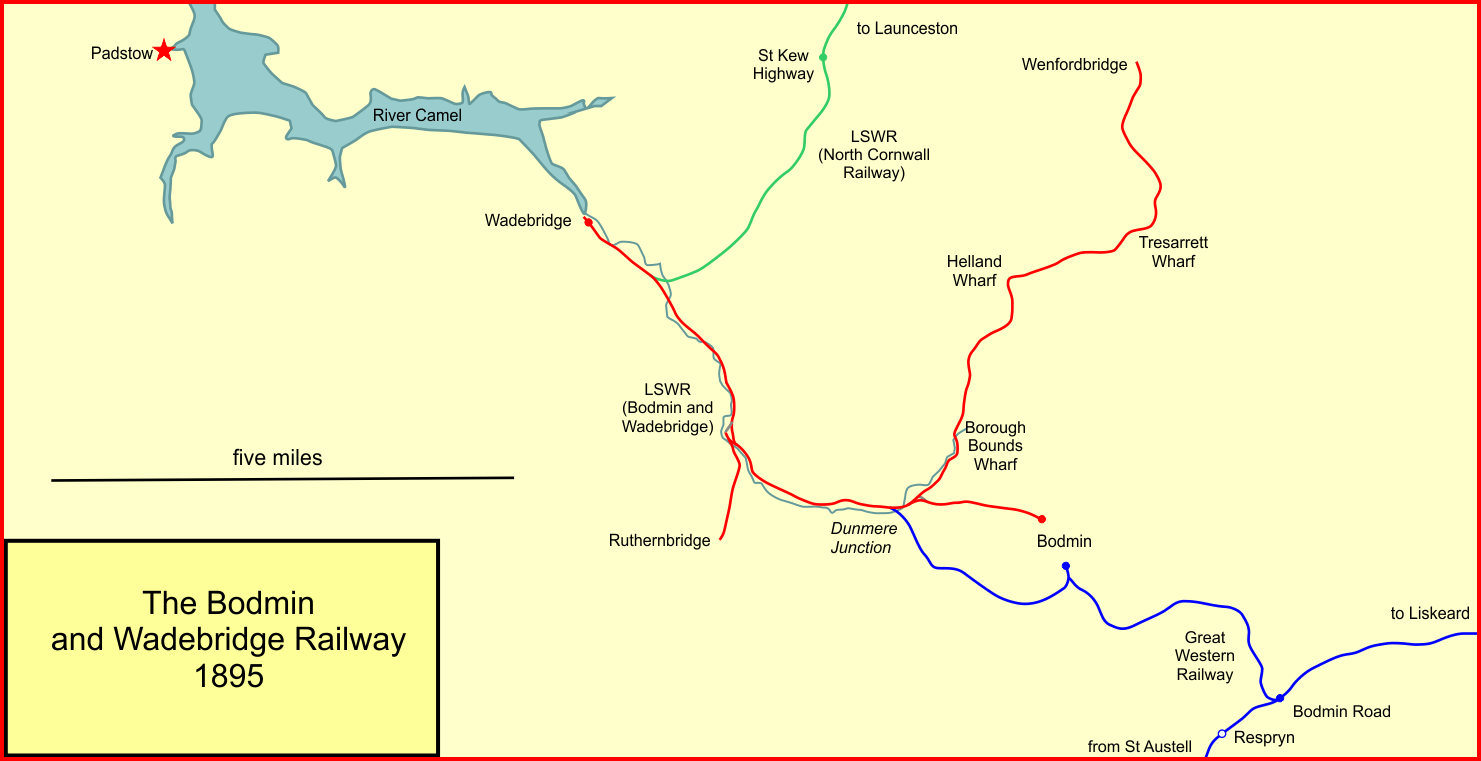
System map of the Bodmin and Wadebridge Railway system in 1895

Construction of the North Cornwall line from Halwill was much delayed due to difficulty in raising the necessary capital, and after several extensions of time it opened to a special goods train on 31 May 1895 and fully on 1 June 1895. The planned eastern arm of the triangular junction with the Bodmin and Wadebridge having been long forgotten. The North Cornwall converged with the Bodmin and Wadebridge line at Wadebridge Junction, about a mile east of Wadebridge itself.

Padstow had to wait still further, and after yet another act of Parliament, the North Cornwall Railway Act 1894 (57 & 58 Vict. c. clxxxvi), allowing variation the Wadebridge to Padstow section was opened to the public on 27 March 1899.

On 1 November 1895 the LSWR resumed running trains on the Bodmin and Wadebridge section, and therefore journeys from Waterloo to Bodmin, changing at Wadebridge, became feasible, taking from 7 hours 18 minutes to about 9 hours. The GWR continued its service of seven trains a day.

== The twentieth century ==
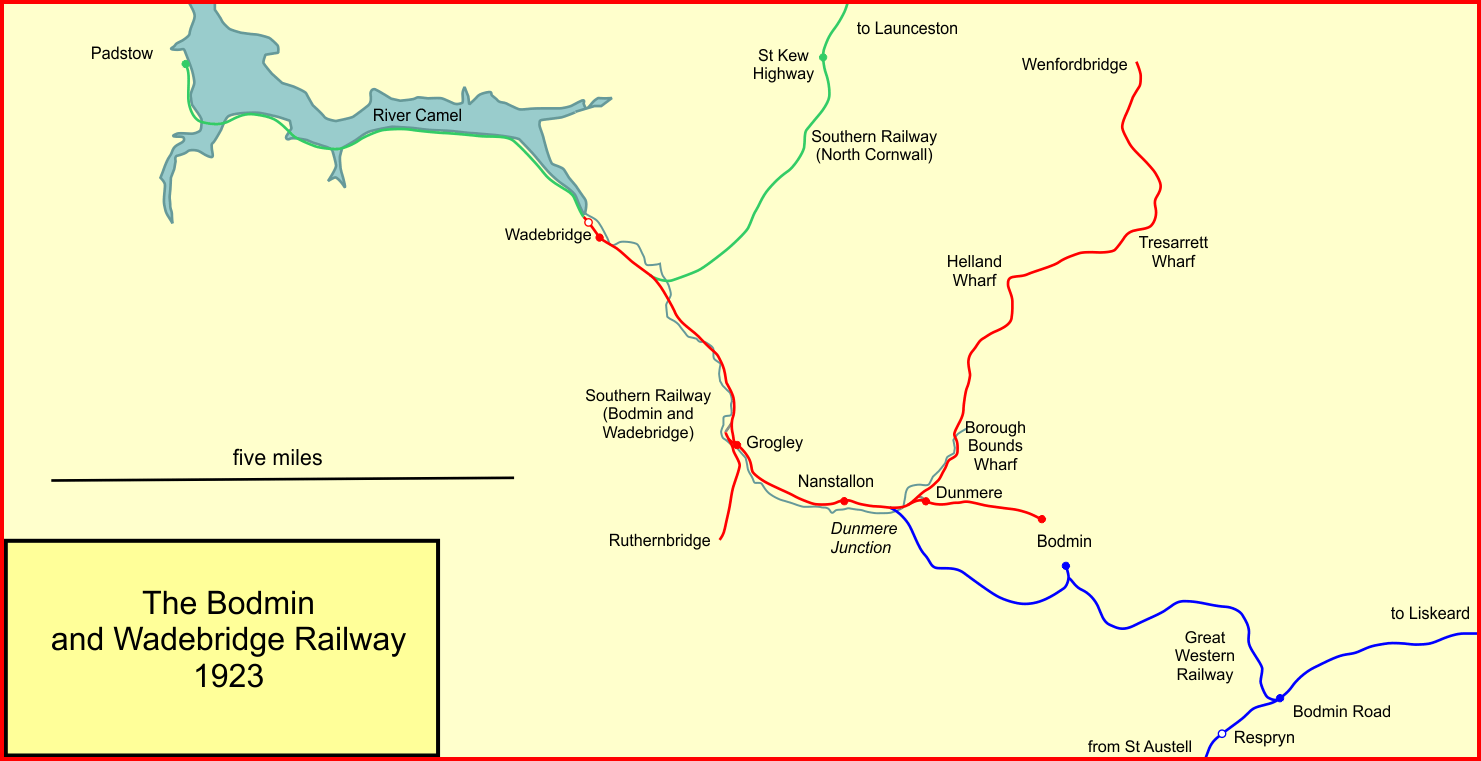
System map of the Bodmin & Wadebridge Railway system in 1923

Traffic on the line remained very light, and the LSWR installed class H13 steam railcars on the passenger trains; they seated 40 passengers. At the same time, intermediate halts were opened at Grogley Halt, Nanstallon Halt and Dunmere Halt on 2 July 1906. Mitchell and Smith also refer to a St Lawrence Hospital Platform, near the road to Nanstallon, opened in 1906 and closed in 1917. St Lawrence's Hospital is shown as "County Lunatic Asylum" on the 1908 Ordnance Survey map, but the platform is not shown. The location must have been on St Lawrence Road.

A second line was provided from Wadebridge Junction to Wadebridge, one line leading from the North Cornwall line and the other from the Bodmin line. The junction signalbox was abolished, and the two lines to Wadebridge were operated as two single lines. This arrangement applied from 4 February 1907.

Ruthern Bridge had originally been provided for several small mineral mines in the immediate area; but these declined in the twentieth century, and the last train ran on 29 November 1933, the ground frame connection to the main line being closed on 1 January 1934.

During World War II an armoured train was based at Wadebridge powered by an LNER Class F4 tank engine to patrol the "Bodmin Stop Line" which covered the whole of the B&W from Padstow to Bodmin, and also the line from Bodmin to Fowey. Until 1941 the engine was constantly "in steam" and was variously crewed by the Royal Tank Regiment, the Royal Engineers and Polish soldiers. Although not considered a high value target, the railway did not totally escape the war unscathed as an attack on 7 August 1941 resulted in bomb damage to Bodmin North station and an ammunition train was strafed while climbing from Boscarne Junction towards Bodmin General.

The Bodmin station was renamed Bodmin North on 26 September 1949; the GWR station was renamed Bodmin General. The B&W station was destaffed on 3 January 1966 and became a Halt on 18 April 1966—an unusual case of a terminal station being a halt.

A modern clay drying works was built alongside the Wenfordbridge line just north of Poley's Bridge Road some time before 1962; china clay was piped as a slurry from Stannon Moor, over four miles away, and the dried product was conveyed away by train.

From 1964 strict economies were to be made on the line, which after all had two train services from two different Bodmin stations. A new platform was opened on 15 June called Boscarne Exchange Platform; trains from Bodmin General to Wadebridge stopped here, and a diesel railbus operated a shuttle connection between there and the original Bodmin & Wadebridge station. The railbuses had steps to enable passengers to join and alight, so the "platform" on the B&W line was at ground level. There was no public access to and from the station, which was only for immediate transfer between the two trains. Oil lamps were provided—in 1964!

In 1966 the North Cornwall line between Halwill and Wadebridge was closed, and for a short period the Bodmin and Wadebridge trains were the only connection to Padstow.

In fact passenger services finished on 30 January 1967. Public goods facilities at Wenfordbridge were withdrawn on 1 May 1967, and the line became a dedicated branch for the china clay private sidings, gaining access to the railway network via Bodmin General (reverse) and Bodmin Road. The line closed in 1983.

In 1974 a preservation society was formed, which became the Bodmin and Wenford Railway. They have established a successful railway museum at Bodmin General, and run steam hauled passenger trains to Bodmin Parkway and to Boscarne. It is their aim to extend from Boscarne Junction to Wadebridge alongside the trail, on the route of the Bodmin and Wadebridge line.

== Rolling stock ==
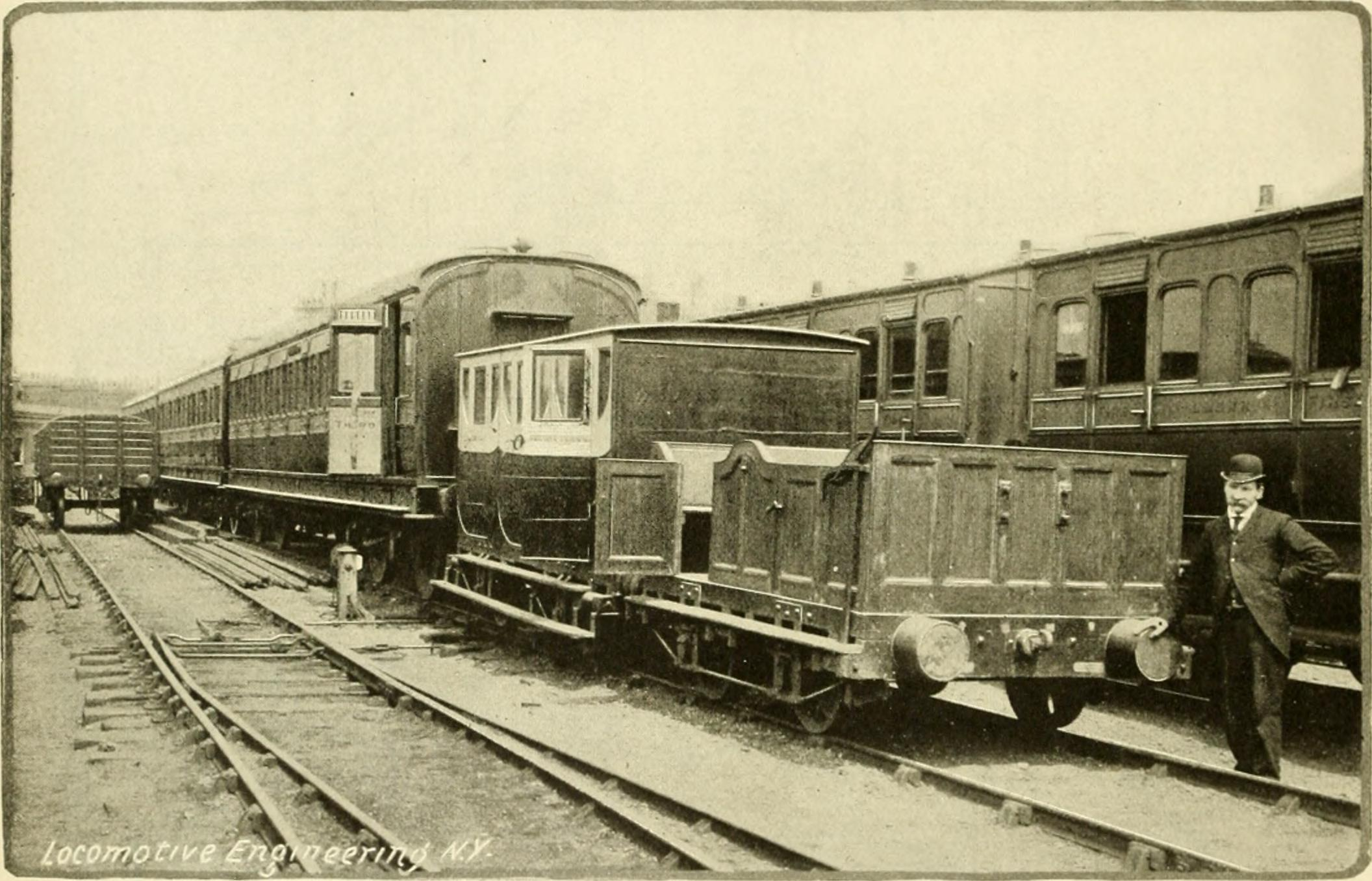
"The oldest rolling stock in England, Bodmin & Wadebridge Railway, in use for fifty years", from a photograph in Locomotive Engineering Magazine, volume IX, New York, 1896, page 44

The National Railway Museum includes three carriages built for the Bodmin and Wadebridge Railway when it opened in 1834. The open third class carriage resembles an open goods wagon with planks for seats and opening doors, the second class carriage is enclosed with two compartments, and the first class carriage (now mixed first/second) was built to look like the contemporary horse-drawn carriages and has upholstered seats. All three have dumb buffers and cast iron wheels. The carriages were discovered in a shed on the railway and were put on display at London Waterloo station in 1915 before becoming part of the national collection in 1975.

When the rolling stock came to be standardised with the rest of the network, the age of the route gave some difficulties. There was a trial of SECR P Class 0-6-0 on the line, which was a failure because of the lightly laid track and sharp curves, which made running difficult for locomotives not designed to accommodate it. As a result, three of the LSWR 0298 Class, Victorian locomotives designed for urban passenger duties, were retained on the line significantly past their life-expiry, and became an attraction in the far west for locomotive enthusiasts, being recorded as prodigious survivors as early as 1949 by C. Hamilton Ellis. They were eventually replaced by GWR 1366 Class dock tanks in 1962 after the line had been transferred to the Western Region of British Railways.

== See also ==
- Southern Railway routes west of Salisbury
