= List of railway stations in Cornwall =

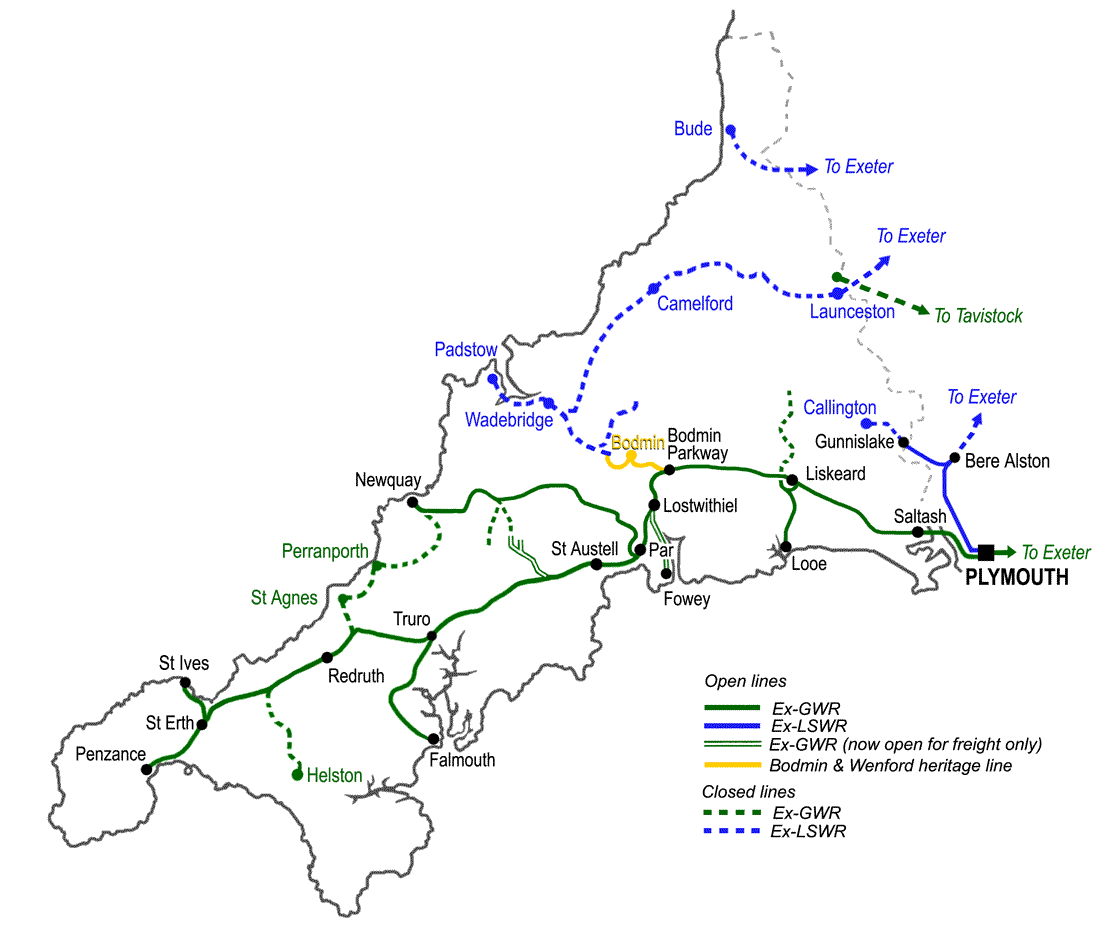
The railways in Cornwall and west Devon.

The first of the passenger railway stations in Cornwall, England, were opened in 1834. The network expanded considerably between the 1840s and 1900s. There were 81 stations in the duchy in 1960 but rationalisation of lines and stations has reduced this to just 36 National rail stations since 1989 including two opened in the 1970s. These are on the Cornish Main Line (between Penzance and Saltash where it continues across the Royal Albert Bridge into Devon) and the five remaining branch lines. There are also a small number of new or reopened stations on heritage railways.

The busiest station is Truro with more than one million passengers each year; the quietest is Coombe Junction Halt with fewer than 250.

== Railway development in Cornwall ==
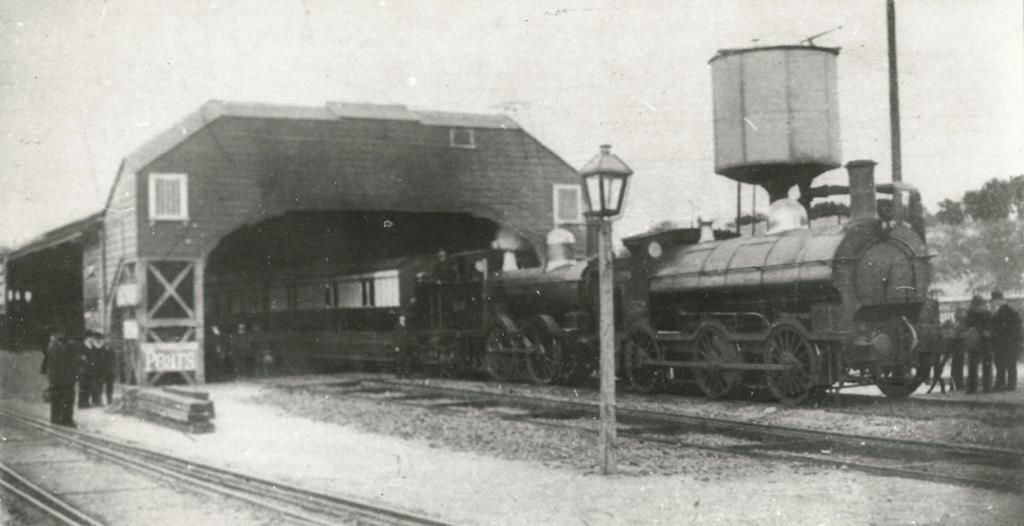
The CR station at Truro opened in 1859 (Photographed in 1892)

Early transport in Cornwall relied on coastal shipping so the first rail tracks were laid to connect the hinterland with harbours. The first line to carry passengers was the Bodmin and Wadebridge Railway (B&WR) on 4 July 1834.

In the west the Hayle Railway connected that port with Redruth at the end of 1837 and started a passenger service on 23 May 1843. This line was not convenient to operate but was taken over by the West Cornwall Railway (WCR) and realigned in 1852, extending it west to Penzance and east to Truro. It moved its Truro terminus to join the new Cornwall Railway (CR) which opened from Plymouth on 4 May 1859. The CR completed its line from Truro to Falmouth on 24 August 1863. The WCR and CR were financially supported by the Great Western Railway (GWR). Other branch lines were opened, either by the GWR or independent companies which were later absorbed, to places such as Fowey and Newquay (1876) Looe (1879), St Ives and Helston (1887), and Bodmin (1888). The GWR network was completed in 1905 by a long line which connected Truro with Newquay via Perranporth.

Meanwhile the B&WR had been bought by the London and South Western Railway (LSWR) but remained isolated from its parent until their line through the north of Cornwall to Wadebridge opened in 1895. This was extended to Padstow in 1899. The LSWR also supported branches across the border from Devon to Bude (1898) and Callington (1908). The GWR also had a cross-border line to Launceston from 1865. The LSWR became part of the Southern Railway in 1923 while the GWR continued with its same name, although absorbing the last of the still independent lines that it operated.

The 1900s saw a number of small halts opened and, often, closed as the railways made an effort to keep local traffic away from trams and buses. The railways themselves operated bus routes, the first in the country being a GWR service from Helston railway station to The Lizard in 1903.

During the 1960s many of the quieter stations and lines were closed, either as a result of Dr Beeching's Reshaping of British Railways or general commercial considerations. The whole of the LSWR network was closed (except for two stations on a truncated Callington line) as were many GWR branches, but this has allowed heritage and narrow gauge railways to open using parts of these old lines.

== Stations on the national network ==
Estimated station usage based on sales of tickets in stated financial year(s) which end or originate at each station from Office of Rail and Road statistics. The methodology for calculating the number may vary between years. Closure dates refer to passenger services, goods traffic may have continued to a later date.

Station	Opened	Closed	Route	Usage 1999–2000	Usage 2018–19	Notes
Angarrack	1852	1853	Cornish Main Line			
Bodmin General	1887	1967	Bodmin branch			Reopened as heritage station 1987
Bodmin North	1834	1967	Bodmin and Wadebridge			
Bodmin Parkway	1859	–	Cornish Main Line, Bodmin branch	144,723	234,030	Known as Bodmin Road until 1983. Also used by heritage services to Bodmin from 1990.
Boscarne Junction	1964	1966	Bodmin and Wadebridge, Bodmin branch			Reopened as heritage station on new site in 1996
Bude	1898	1966	Bude branch			
Bugle	1876	–	Atlantic Coast Line	1,262	5,616	
Burngullow	1863	1931	Cornish Main Line			Junction for goods line to Drinnick Mill
Callington	1908	1966	Callington branch			Known as Callington Road until 1909
Calstock	1908	–	Tamar Valley Line	24,133	37,834	
Camborne	1843	–	Cornish Main Line	112,063	266,006	
Camelford	1893	1966	North Cornwall			
Carbis Bay	1877	–	St Ives Bay Line	38,410	227,854	
Carn Brea	1843	1961	Cornish Main Line			Known as Pool until 1875 except for a short period in 1852-1854 when it was Carn Brea
Causeland	1879	–	Looe Valley Line	2,203	1,620	
Chacewater	1853	1964	Cornish Main Line, Perranporth branch			
Chilsworthy Halt	1909	1966	Callington branch			
Coombe Junction Halt	1901	–	Looe Valley Line	32	204	
Copperhouse	1843	1852	Hayle Railway			
Copperhouse Halt	1905	1908	Cornish Main Line			
Defiance Platform	1905	1930	Cornish Main Line			
Delabole	1893	1966	North Cornwall			
Dolcoath Halt	1905	1908	Cornish Main Line			
Doublebois	1860	1964	Cornish Main Line			
Dunmere Halt	1906	1967	Bodmin and Wadebridge			
Egloskerry	1892	1966	North Cornwall			
Falmouth Docks	1863	–	Maritime Line	27,050	96,726	Closed 1970, reopened 1975
Falmouth Town	1970	–	Maritime Line	74,026	213,934	Known as The Dell from 1975 until 1989
Fowey	1876	1965	Fowey branch			
Golant Halt	1896	1965	Fowey branch			
Goonbell Halt	1905	1963	Perranporth branch			
Goonhavern Halt	1905	1963	Perranporth branch			
Grampound Road	1859	1964	Cornish Main Line			
Grogley Halt	1906	1967	Bodmin and Wadebridge			
Gunnislake	1908	–	Tamar Valley Line	39,340	60,396	Relocated 1994
Gwinear Road	1853	1964	Cornish Main Line, Helston branch			
Hayle	1843	1852	Hayle Railway			
Hayle	1852	–	Cornish Main Line	38,816	83,446	
Helston	1887	1962	Helston branch			
Latchley	1908	1966	Callington branch			
Launceston North	1865	1952	Launceston branch			
Launceston South	1886	1966	North Cornwall			
Lelant	1877	–	St Ives Bay Line	4,823	10,632	
Lelant Saltings	1978	–	St Ives Bay Line	99,778	138,012	
Liskeard	1859	–	Cornish Main Line, Looe Valley Line	207,802	351,172	
Looe	1860	–	Looe Valley Line	68,466	117,506	Platform shortened 1968
Lostwithiel	1859	–	Cornish Main Line	33,767	66,624	
Luckett	1908	1966	Callington branch			Known as Stoke Climsand until 1909
Luxulyan	1876	–	Atlantic Coast Line	837	1,770	Known as Bridges until 1905
Marazion	1852	1964	Cornish Main Line			Known as Marazion Road until 1896
Menheniot	1859	–	Cornish Main Line	9,652	3,696	
Mitchell and Newlyn Halt	1905	1963	Perranporth branch			
Mithian Halt	1905	1963	Perranporth branch			
Moorswater	1879	1901	Looe Valley Line			
Mount Hawke Halt	1905	1963	Perranporth branch			
Nancegollan	1887	1962	Helston branch			
Nanstallon Halt	1906	1967	Bodmin and Wadebridge			
Newquay	1876	–	Atlantic Coast Line, Perranporth branch	63,968	103,172	
Otterham	1893	1966	North Cornwall			
Padstow	1899	1967	North Cornwall			
Par	1859	–	Cornish Main Line, Atlantic Coast Line	66,379	194,644	
Par Bridge Halt	1897	1908	Par to Fowey			
Penmere	1925	–	Maritime Line	57,208	191,414	
Penryn	1863	–	Maritime Line	40,875	240,156	
Penzance	1852	–	Cornish Main Line	406,236	570,098	Rebuilt 1890; new platforms 1937
Perranporth	1903	1963	Perranporth branch			
Perranporth Beach Halt	1931	1963	Perranporth branch			
Perranwell	1863	–	Maritime Line	8,279	31,920	Known as Perran until 1864
Port Isaac Road	1895	1966	North Cornwall			
Praze	1887	1962	Helston branch			
Probus and Ladock Halt	1908	1957	Cornish Main Line			
Quintrell Downs	1911	–	Atlantic Coast Line	1,019	2,684	
Redruth	1843	1852	Hayle Railway			
Redruth	1852	–	Cornish Main Line	183,799	327,532	
Respryn	1859	1859	Cornish Main Line			Temporary station until Bodmin Road was ready for use
Roche	1876	–	Atlantic Coast Line	545	5,090	Known as Holywell for a short while and then Victoria until 1904
St Agnes	1931	1963	Perranporth branch			
St Austell	1859	–	Cornish Main Line	238,316	460,130	Rebuilt 2000
St Blazey	1876	1925	Atlantic Coast Line			Known as Par until 1879 but renamed to avoid confusion with the station of that name on the main line
St Columb Road	1876	–	Atlantic Coast Line	1,474	1,936	Known as Halloon until 1878
St Erth	1852	–	Cornish Main Line, St Ives Bay Line	58,747	271,234	Known as St Ives Road until the branch line opened in 1877 Grade II listed
St Germans	1859	–	Cornish Main Line	25,970	56,698	
St Ives	1877	–	St Ives Bay Line	259,302	750,478	Relocated 1971
St Kew Highway	1895	1966	North Cornwall			
St Keyne Wishing Well Halt	1900	–	Looe Valley Line	923	1,334	
St Lawrence Platform	1895	1966	Bodmin and Wadebridge			
Saltash	1859	–	Cornish Main Line	28,889	83,574	Rebuilt 1880
Sandplace	1881	–	Looe Valley Line	1,575	1,274	
Scorrier	1852	1964	Cornish Main Line			Known as Scorrier Gate until 1896 except for the short period from 1856-1859 when it was Scorrier
Seven Stones Halt	1910	1914	Callington branch			
Shepherds	1905	1963	Perranporth branch			
Shooting Range Platform	1885	1947	Bodmin and Wadebridge			Opening and closing dates are uncertain
Tresmeer	1891	1966	North Cornwall			
Trewerry and Trerice Halt	1905	1963	Perranporth branch			
Truro	1859	–	Cornish Main Line, Maritime Line	578,008	1,186,886	Rebuilt 1900
Truro Newham	1855	1863	West Cornwall Railway			
Truro Road	1852	1855	West Cornwall Railway			Temporary station at Highertown
Truthall Halt	1905	1963	Helston branch			Known as Truthall Platform from 1906. Reopened as heritage station in 2017.
Wadebridge	1834	1967	Bodmin and Wadebridge, North Cornwall			Rebuilt 1888 Grade II listed

== Heritage railway stations ==
Station	Opened	Closed	Heritage opened	Route	Notes
Benny Halt	–	–	1974	Lappa Valley Steam Railway	
Bodmin General	1887	1967	1987	Bodmin and Wenford Railway	
Bodmin Parkway	1859	–	1990	Bodmin and Wenford Railway	Known as Bodmin Road until 1983.
Boscarne Junction	1964	1966	1996	Bodmin and Wenford Railway	Original platform was on a different site adjacent to the Bodmin North branch line
Canna Park	–	–	tbc	Launceston Steam Railway	
Colesloggett Halt	–	–	1992	Bodmin and Wenford Railway	
Hunts Crossing	–	–	tbc	Launceston Steam Railway	
Launceston	–	–	1983	Launceston Steam Railway	Not on the site of previous Launceston station which closed in 1966
Newmills	–	–	1995	Launceston Steam Railway	
Trevarno	–	–	2011	Helston Railway	
Truthall Halt	1905	1963	2017	Helston Railway	
