= Prospidnick =

Coordinates: 50.133333°N 5.295°W

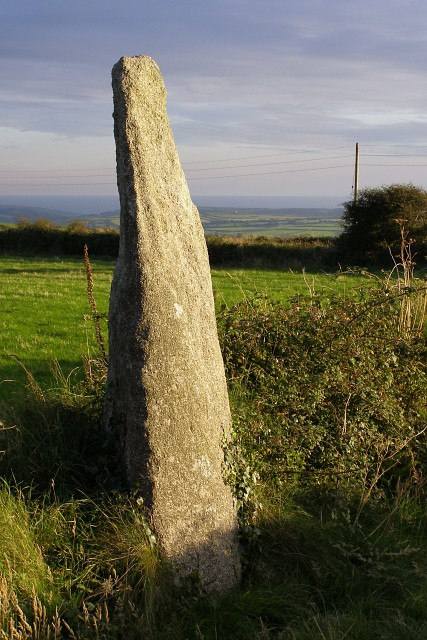

- Location within Cornwall
- Civil parish: Sithney
- Unitary authority: Cornwall
- Ceremonial county: Cornwall
- Region: South West
- Country: England
- Sovereign state: United Kingdom
- Police: Devon and Cornwall
- Fire: Cornwall
- Ambulance: South Western

Prospidnick is a small village and hill in the parish of Sithney in Cornwall, United Kingdom. It lies 0.6 miles east of Crowntown and 2.6 miles west of Wendron by road. It is divided into Lower Prospidnick and Higher Prospidnick.

== History ==
Various spelling have been documented including Prospynneck, 1577; Prospynnecke, 1606; Prispynneck, Pryspinneck, c.1625; Prespynick, 1636; Prispidnick, 1665; Prospinnick, 1841, 1842; Prospidneck, 1884; and Prospidnick since 1996. Historically, it was known for its granite hills; and the Propidnick Wheal Mine and quarry operated in the area. In 1916, the Prospidnick Mining Company was reportedly interested in mining in Nancegollan.

== Geography ==
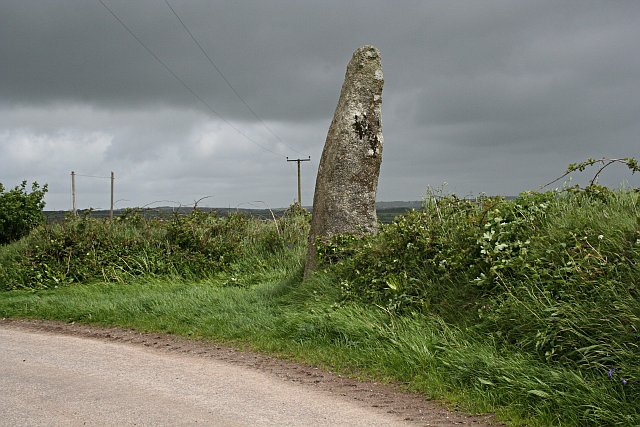
The Prospidnick Long Stone

Along with Prospidnick, there are several other villages in Sithney parish; these include Guavas, Mellangoose, Higher and Lower Prospidnick, Tregoose, Trevarnoe, and Truthal. The region is characterized by rock, granite, wolfram and tinstone. The easternmost of the two great granitic tracts in West Cornwall extends from Prospidnick and Nancegollan in the west to Ponsanooth and Budock to the east, and from near Polwheveral in the south to Wheal Butter to the north.

Much of Longstone Downs was turned into tillable ground in the early 1880s by Mr R G Rowe who had a 99-year lease on the higher portion of Prospidnick Hill. Some of the surrounding area was not suitable for crops, Mr Bickford-Smith planted several acres of shrubs ″ ... which, it is hoped, will in a few years tend to relieve the monotony of the present appearance of the long stretch of the Prospidnick Hills.″

== Notable landmarks ==
Prospidnick Manor once belonged to the Arundells, then Christopher Wallis and in 1872 was reported to be in the property of his representative C W Popham. The Prospidnick Long Stone is a 3 metres (9.8 ft) high standing stone, a large granite menhir, on Longstone Down, 660 metres (2,170 ft) northeast of Prospidnick Hill. There is also logan stone (the Men Amber) and an overgrown cromlech. The Cornish Heart Unit Fund has a building in the village. To the southwest there is a church called Chynhale Methodist Chapel. Some of the buildings in Prospidnick are cottages dated to the 18th century with thatched roofs.

Another landmark in Prospidnick is the Prospidnick Arch, a railway bridge that is part of the local Helston Railway. It is reported to be 40 feet (12 m) high and cost £1,000 in the early 1880s.
