= Sithney =

Coordinates: 50°7′N 5°19′W

Sithney: Cornish: Merthersydhni
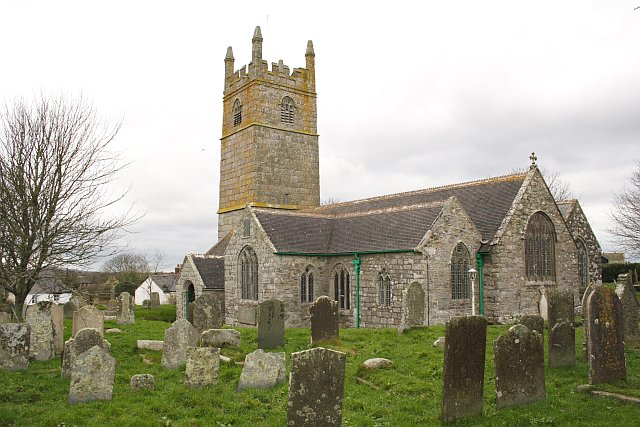
- Sithney Church
- Shire county: Cornwall
- Region: South West
- Country: England
- Sovereign state: United Kingdom
- Post town: Helston
- Postcode district: TR13
- Police: Devon and Cornwall
- Fire: Cornwall
- Ambulance: South Western

Sithney (Cornish: Merthersydhni) is a village and civil parish in the West of Cornwall, England, United Kingdom. Sithney is north of Porthleven. The population including Boscadjack and Crowntown at the 2011 census was 841.

It is named after Saint Sithney, the patron saint of the parish church. Saint Sithney was one of the band of Irish missionaries who came to west Cornwall. William Worcester recorded in 1478 that the body of the saint lay within the church.

== History ==
=== Church ===
In 1230 the church belonged to the Antrenon family who attached to it a charge of 4 shillings yearly to the priory of St Germans. In 1267 it was appropriated to Glasney College; the last rector ceded his benefice to the college in 1270.

The parish church is of Norman foundation but the present structure is more or less of the 15th century. The old Norman font of this church was removed to the new church of Carnmenellis (since demolished). A 13th-century coffin slab was brought to the church from St John's. In the churchyard is a monument to John Oliver, 1741. John Rogers, the landowner, mineral lord and biblical scholar, is buried here. On 30 May 1882, Messrs Hele & Co of Plymouth installed an organ at a cost of £200.

=== Bridges ===
St. Johns area is included in the parish of Sithney. The bridge across the main road has two dates carved into granite stones; 1833 and 1861 after it was completed. Nearer Sithney Common Hill stands St. Johns Bridge (Helston Bridge) that, although originally completed by 1260, has only the central west archway section remaining. Otherwise, the older sections left were built in the 16th century.

=== Hospitals and houses ===
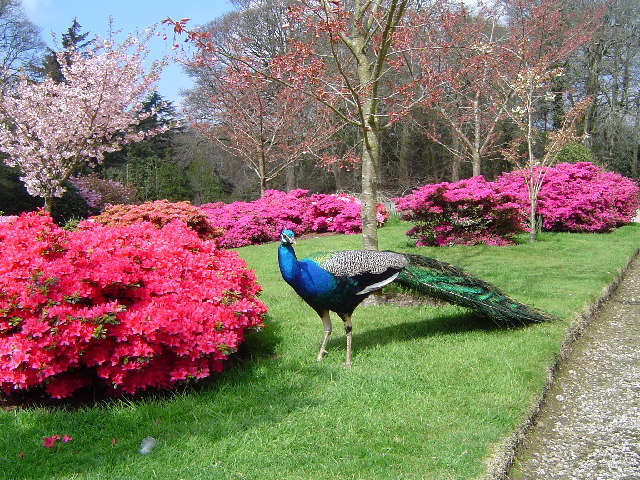
Gardens at Trevarno

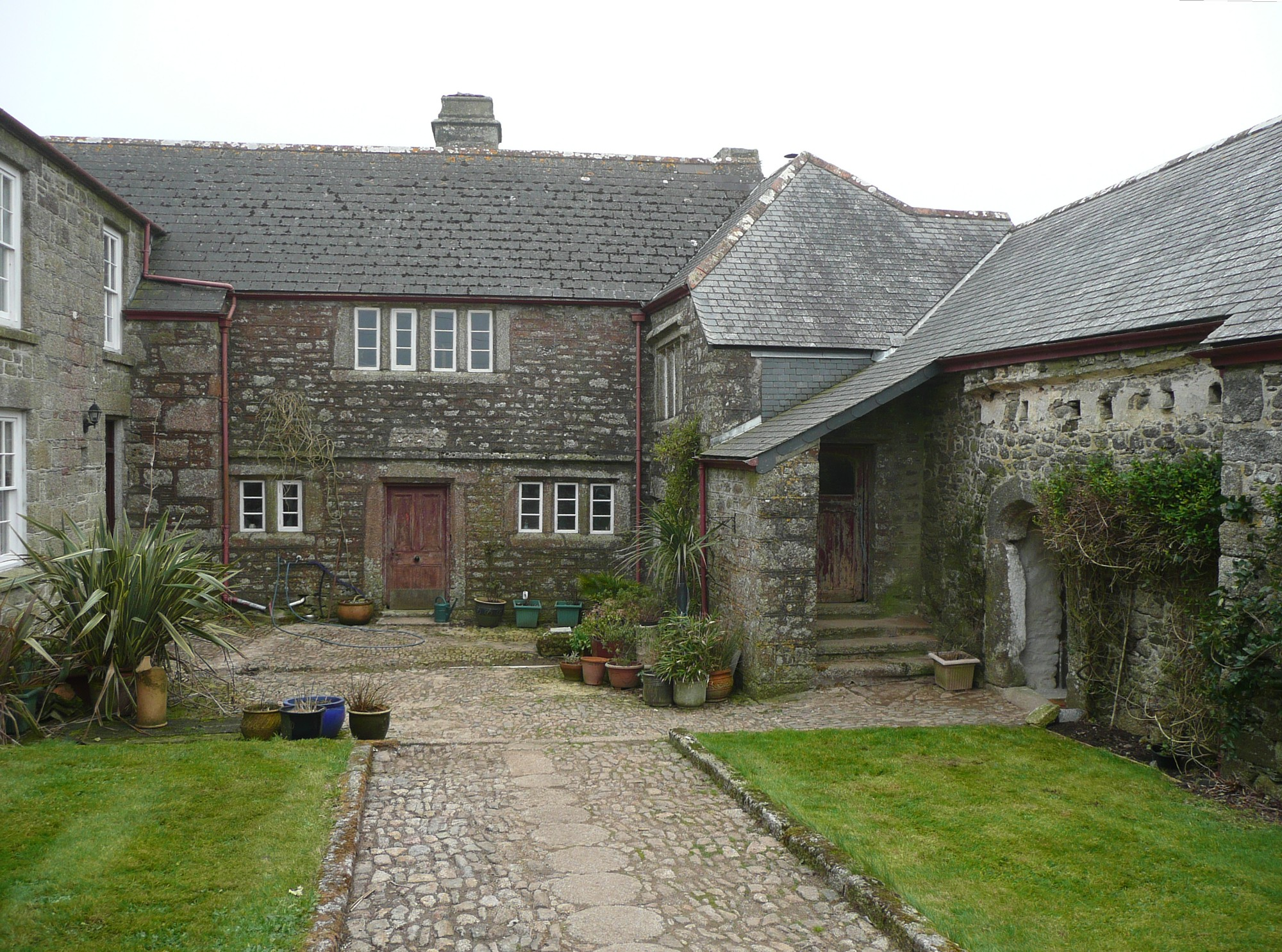
Truthall

At St Johns near Helston Bridge a hospital was founded c. 1250 by Henry de Bollegh, Archdeacon of Cornwall, and endowed with the manor of Penventon by the Reskymer family. This foundation consisted in 1324 of a prior and two brethren. The hospital was abolished in 1545; by this time the priors had been non-resident for 50 years, the building was ruinous and a lone chaplain served the chapel. A leper hospital was founded nearby in the 15th century and dedicated to St Mary Magdalene.

At Truthall was the medieval mansion of the Nance family which has an old chapel of c. 1500. The mansion forms the right wing of Truthall manor; the centre is dated 1642 and the left wing 19th century. The gate piers, courtyard, walls and central building linking the old mansion and Truthall manor are Grade II* listed. Truthall was recorded in the Domesday Book (1086) as having half a hide of land. It was part of the royal manor of Winnianton. In 1903, a halt station was built for the Manor, called Truthall Halt, situated on the Helston Branchline.

Truthall has a derivation from "tre" "Iudhael", i.e. Iudhael's farm. The same derivation applies to Truthwall in Ludgvan; however Truthwall in Crowan and Truthwall in St Just in Penwith derive from "tre" "Godual" (Godual's farm).

== School ==
Since 1912 there has been a small school about half-a-mile away from the village. The school is called Sithney Community Primary School and has 36 pupils. The accommodation includes three classrooms, a hall, and a pre-school room. Outside there is a playground and a field with play equipment.

== Cornish wrestling ==
Cornish wrestling tournaments, for prizes, were held in Sithney for centuries. Venues for tournaments included the field at the rear of the Tree Inn.

William Pascoe (1722-1808), the parish clark of Sithney for 60 years, was the champion of Cornwall for many years.

William Hodge (1815-?), originally from Sithney, won many tournaments in the UK before emigrating to Australia, including beating Gundry in Penzance in 1843. He was an Australian Cornish wrestling champion in the late 1840s and early 1850s, winning over 80 prizes. He was 5 feet 10 inches high and weighed 174 lbs. He was champion of Australia in 1851, beating James Chipman for the title. He was champion of Australasia in 1851. He was owner of the Brecknock Arms in Adelaide which was the venue for many tournaments and challenge matches.

See also Cornish wrestling at Crowntown.

== Civil parish ==
Sithney civil parish includes:

- Boscadjack (Higher and Lower)
- Chynhale
- Coverack Bridges
- Crowntown
- Gwavas
- Lowertown (part)
- Sithney Green
- Trelissick
- Truthall
