= 1973 Kerrier District Council election =

Cornish elections

7 June 1973	1976 →

All 42 seats of Kerrier District Council 22 seats needed for a majority

	First party	Second party
Party	Independent	Conservative
Seats won	33	6
Popular vote	28,485	9,573
Percentage	58.4%	19.6%
	Third party
Party	Labour
Seats won	3
Popular vote	10,714
Percentage	22.0%
- The County of Cornwall within England
Council control before election
Council Established
Council control after election
Independent

Kerrier was a non-metropolitan district in Cornwall, England, created by the Local Government Act 1972. Elections were held to the new authorities in 1973, and they acted as "shadow authorities" until the handover date. Elections were held on 7 June. All 18 divisions were up for election, covering 42 seats across single and multiple-member wards.

== Results ==
Kerrier District Council Election Result 1973
Party	Seats	Gains	Losses	Net gain/loss	Seats %	Votes %	Votes	+/−
Independent	33				78.6	54.8	28,485	
Conservative	6				14.3	19.6	9,573	
Labour	3				7.1	22.0	10,714	

=== By Ward ===
The electoral division results listed below are in alphabetical order, as described at the time, including numbered divisions.

Breage & Germoe
Party	Candidate	Votes	%	±%
Independent	Trevaskis, K (Ms.)	641		
Independent	Buckett, T	436		
Independent	Keverne, S	300		
Independent	Smith, W	264		
Independent	Beazley, R	106		
Turnout			29.4	

Constantine & Gweek
Party	Candidate	Votes	%	±%
Independent	Tremayne, J	430	62.2	
Independent	Wiseman, N	234	23.8	
Independent	Allen, J	27	3.9	
Turnout		691	45.8	

Crowan
Party	Candidate	Votes	%	±%
Independent	Cristophers, M	453	63.1	
Independent	Henwood, N	171	23.8	
Independent	Jenkin, R	94	13.1	
Turnout		718	51.8	

Grade-Ruan & Landewednack
Party	Candidate	Votes	%	±%
Independent	Trewin, J	437	53.2	
Independent	Hart, T	385	46.8	
Turnout		822	70.4	

Mabe & St. Gluvias
Party	Candidate	Votes	%	±%
Independent	Spargo, E	530	61.3	
Labour	Dunstan, A	335	38.7	
Turnout		865	52.8	

Mawnan & Budock
Party	Candidate	Votes	%	±%
Independent	Mann, F (Ms.)	402	57.3	
Independent	Rickard, W	300	42.7	
Turnout		702	41	

Mullion
Party	Candidate	Votes	%	±%
Independent	Hendy, A	737	76.6	
Independent	Drew, G (Ms.)	225	23.4	
Turnout		962	63.9	

No. 1 (Helston)
Party	Candidate	Votes	%	±%
Independent	Noye, J	1,266		
Independent	Eddy, D	1,016		
Independent	Bryant, K	967		
Labour	Thomas, F	282		
Labour	Southey, P	229		
Turnout			33.7	

No. 2 (Porthleven & Sithney)
Party	Candidate	Votes	%	±%
Independent	Jenkins, V	585		
Independent	Hollands, C	568		
Independent	Balme, D	366		
Independent	Andrews, G	347		
Independent	Gale, M	300		
Independent	Williams, L	234		
Turnout			24.6	

No. 3 (Camborne)
Party	Candidate	Votes	%	±%
Labour	Weeks, A (Ms.)	2,440		
Conservative	Waters, B (Ms.)	2,089		
Independent	Scantlebury, J	2,003		
Labour	Williams, S	1,667		
Conservative	Bowden, K	1,594		
Independent	Gardner, J	1,587		
Conservative	Bath, R	1,539		
Conservative	Richards, C	1,534		
Independent	Willoughby, F	1,530		
Conservative	Kelynack, J	1,464		
Labour	Winstanley, J	1,302		
Labour	Chapple, W	1,208		
Independent	Bray, L	1,113		
Labour	Rule, S	1,101		
Labour	Rutter, K (Ms.)	992		
Turnout			50.2	

No. 4 (Redruth)
Party	Candidate	Votes	%	±%
Independent	Davey, A	1,538		
Independent	Blamey, R	1,210		
Independent	Jeffrey, S	1,201		
Independent	Smith, H	935		
Independent	Ham, J	907		
Independent	Hocking, E	589		
Labour	McKiernan, K	447		
Conservative	Barron, P (Ms)	396		
Turnout			29.5	

No. 5 (Illogan North)
Party	Candidate	Votes	%	±%
Independent	Bawden, F	587		
Independent	Bailey, J	507		
Conservative	Mayne, J	490		
Conservative	Craig, W	467		
Labour	Nettle, M (Ms.)	399		
Independent	Welch, J	312		
Labour	Rowe, P	312		
Turnout			29.7	

No. 6 (Illogan South)
Party	Candidate	Votes	%	±%
Labour	Elford, D			
Independent	Boskano, W			
Independent	Jasper, D			
Turnout				

St. Day, Lanner & Carharrack
Party	Candidate	Votes	%	±%
Independent	Wherry, R			
Independent	Spargo, E			
Conservative	Nurhonen, D			
Turnout				

St. Keverne
Party	Candidate	Votes	%	±%
Independent	Woolnough, H			
Turnout				

Stithians
Party	Candidate	Votes	%	±%
Independent	Williams, J	374	59.0	
Independent	Brown, E	260	41.0	
Turnout		604	52.8	

Wendron & Sithney
Party	Candidate	Votes	%	±%
Independent	Dale, F	498		
Independent	Collins, E	432		
Independent	Jenkin, V	313		
Turnout			19.7	
