= Class 103 =

Class 103 can refer to:

- British Rail Class 103 - British diesel multiple unit
- DB Class 103 - German electric locomotive
- Renfe Class 103 - Spanish high speed multiple unit
