= Trevarno railway station =

Railway station in the UK

Trevarno Station
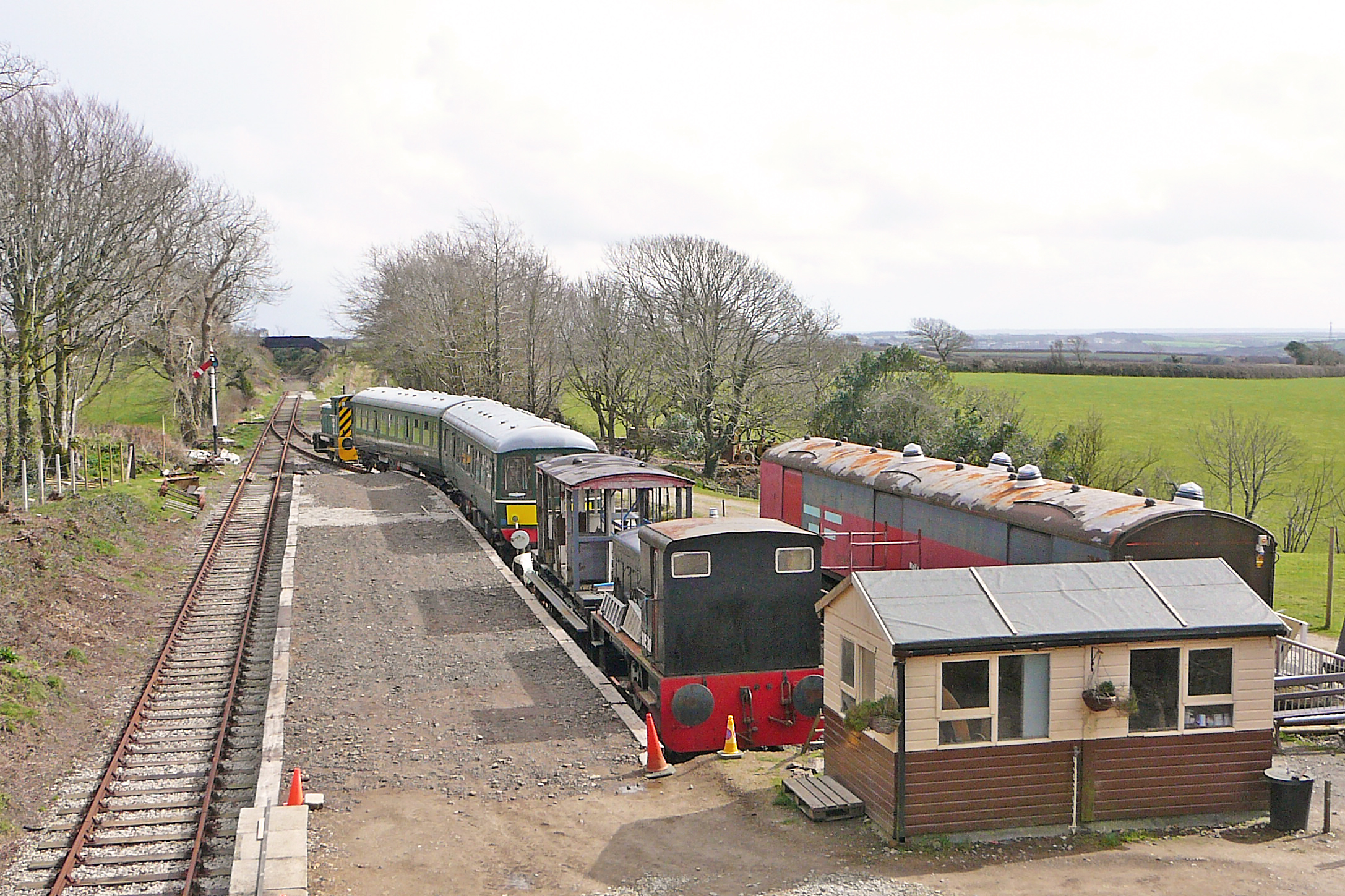

General information
- Location: Helston, Cornwall; England
- Coordinates: 50.1279°N 5.2927°W
- Grid reference: SW647305
- System: Station on heritage railway
- Operator: Helston Railway
- Platforms: 2

History
- Original company: Great Western Railway

Key dates
- 2011: Opened
Location

Trevarno railway station is a small railway station request stop on the Helston Railway, a heritage railway in Cornwall, England, United Kingdom.

== History ==
The Helston Railway Preservation Society started work at Trevarno in 2005 with volunteers starting work on re-opening a section of the line. William Bickford-Smith was the first chairman of the original Helston Railway and he lived at Trevarno House.

A tin mine once stood near by however this was not the site of a station or halt until the Helston Railway opened a station here in 2011 as the terminus of the line at that time. It also served the Trevarno estate gardens until circa 2011. The grand opening ceremony of Trevarno Station was officially held on 26 July 2010 however the station was not able to operate as it was not permitted to carry passengers on that date.

== Description ==
Trevarno Station has a through and a bay platform with a single long siding. It has a station lamp but it no longer has a station building or car park.

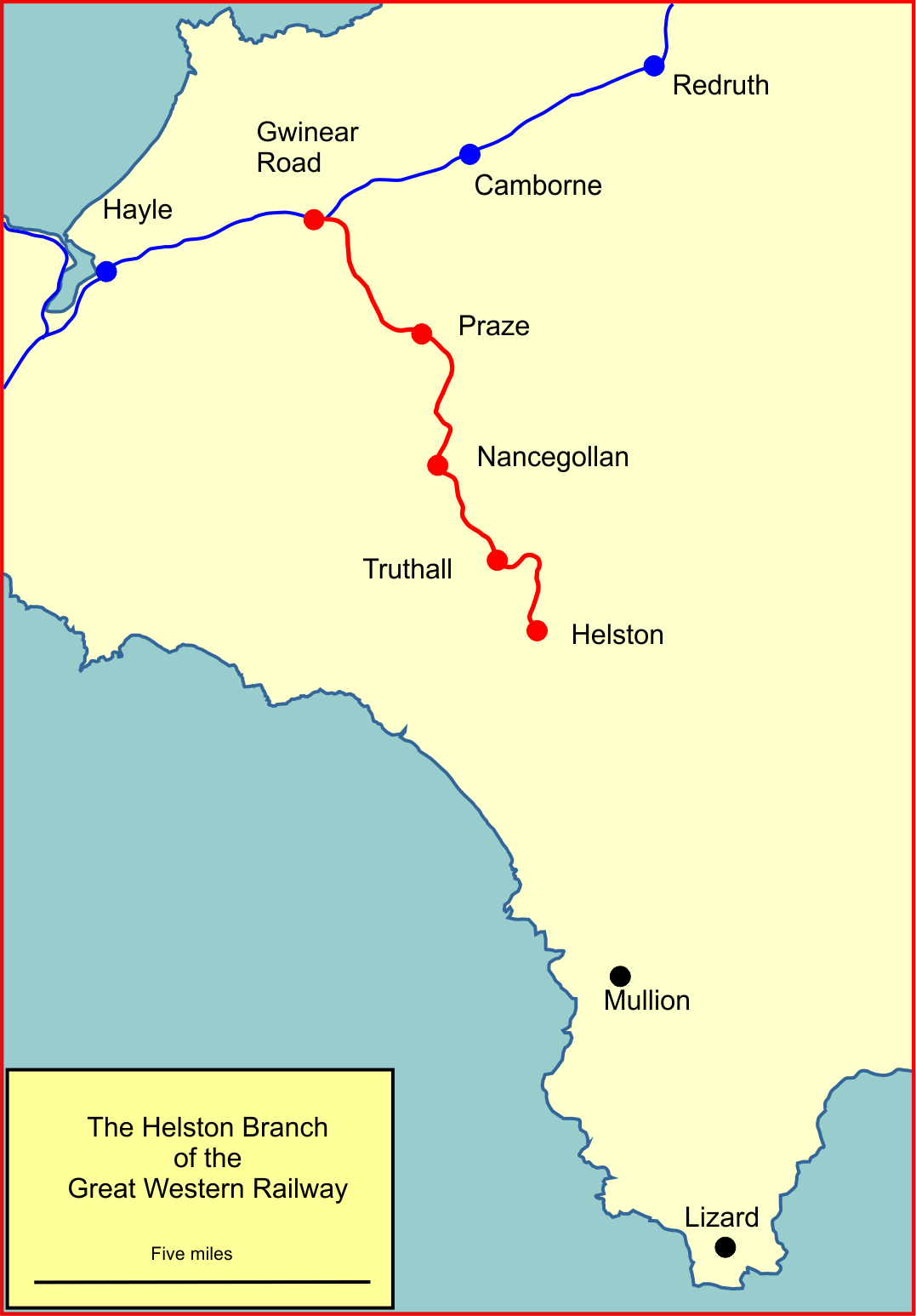
Route map of the Helston branch

== Services ==
This is a now request stop and passenger access is by the Black Bridge reached via a public footpath. Trevarno now lies about one third of the way along the existing line and up until 2012 it was the main operational base with passengers starting and ending their journeys here.

Preceding station	Heritage railways	Following station
Prospidnick Halt	Helston Railway	Truthall Halt
