= Praze-An-Beeble =

Village in Cornwall, Great Britain

Coordinates: 50°10′N 5°19′W

Praze an Beeble (Cornish: Pras an Bibel), sometimes shortened to Praze, is a village in Cornwall, Great Britain. It lies between the nearby towns of Camborne (2.5 miles) and Helston (7 miles) in the civil parish of Crowan.

The name Praze an Beeble was first recorded in 1697 and means the meadow of the pipe/conduit. The pipe can still be seen in the well at SW 6385 3571 opposite the entrance to the Praze medical centre. Contrary to popular belief, the village is not named after the watercourse through the village, which is called the Praze Stream, and was never historically known as the Beeble. Indeed, the upper part of it was the "Cargenwyn Stream" according to the Camborne Water Co. in 1866. It eventually joins the Red River north of Nancemellin near Gwithian. The Red River in Cornish is "Dowr Koner".

Early development in the village was focused around the cross-roads, alongside which there was an inn, a smithy and two coaching houses. The buildings which housed the smithy, two cottages and the inn still remain and are Grade II listed. The settlement appears to have developed as planned, a landlord-controlled, estate village for Clowance, to supply services and housing for the mining industry in the area and also to provide housing for agricultural workers. Its main period of growth until the 20th century was between 1809 and 1840. In this part of the 19th century the rows of cottages lining the road leading north to Camborne were built. In 1897 Polsue described it as "a respectable, compact, and well-built village". Although the population of the village fell between 1881 and 1931 it has subsequently increased. Some building took place south of the village centre between 1906 and 1946, but the majority of modern development has been to the east of the original planned estate village.

Praze has grown to become the largest village in Crowan parish.

== Facilities ==
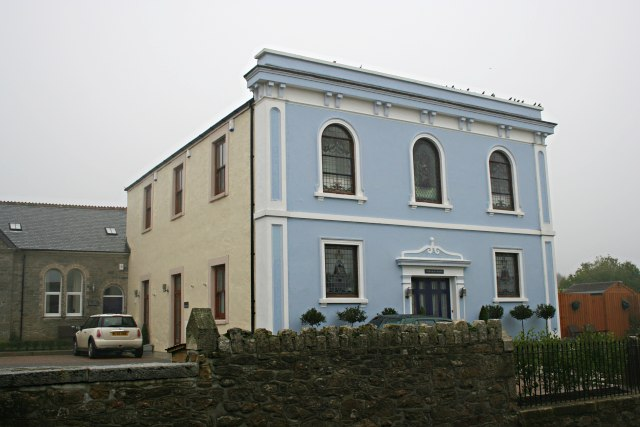
Former Methodist chapel

As of September 2004, a good number of facilities (for a village of its size in the region) remained, including a fish and chip shop, bakery, village shop & Post Office, St Aubyn's Arms public house, and medical practice. The local school is located just outside the village to the east, although it is associated by name with the neighbouring village Crowan.

From 1887 to 1962 the village had its own railway station on the Helston Railway.

Recent developments in the village have all centred on the ongoing works in Fore Street, including plans to alter street furniture and manage traffic, redeveloping the disused police house at the top of Fore Street, updating the Playing Field donated by Mr G Sims of Little Trefewha to the village in memory of his late wife and children's play area. The Playing field is home to Praze Cricket Club.

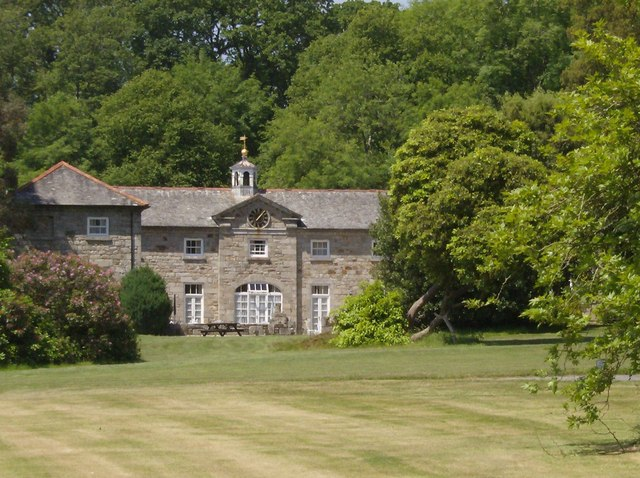
Clowance Estate

The holiday resort of Clowance estate is just outside the village, offering leisure and dining.

== Annual events ==
Every July locals and visitors enjoy the Praze Fair, which involves a parade of local residents and pupils from Crowan School, and a local marching band, and is preceded by a week-long visit from a touring funfair. Also in the summer is the annual Farmers' Ball, when the village's youth congregate in a marquee on the football field to drink and dance.
