= Boscadjack =

Coordinates: 50.1357°N 5.2623°W

- Location within Cornwall
- OS grid reference: SW672314
- Shire county: Cornwall
- Region: South West
- Country: England
- Sovereign state: United Kingdom
- Post town: Helston
- Postcode district: TR13 0
- Police: Devon and Cornwall
- Fire: Cornwall
- Ambulance: South Western

Boscadjack is an area of high ground in west Cornwall, England, United Kingdom, which gives its name to two farming settlements. The area lies to the west of the River Cober about one mile (1.6 km) from Wendron. According to the Post Office the 2011 census population was included in the civil parish of Sithney
