= Helston railway station =

Former railway station in Cornwall, England

Coordinates: 50.1064°N 5.2704°W

Helston
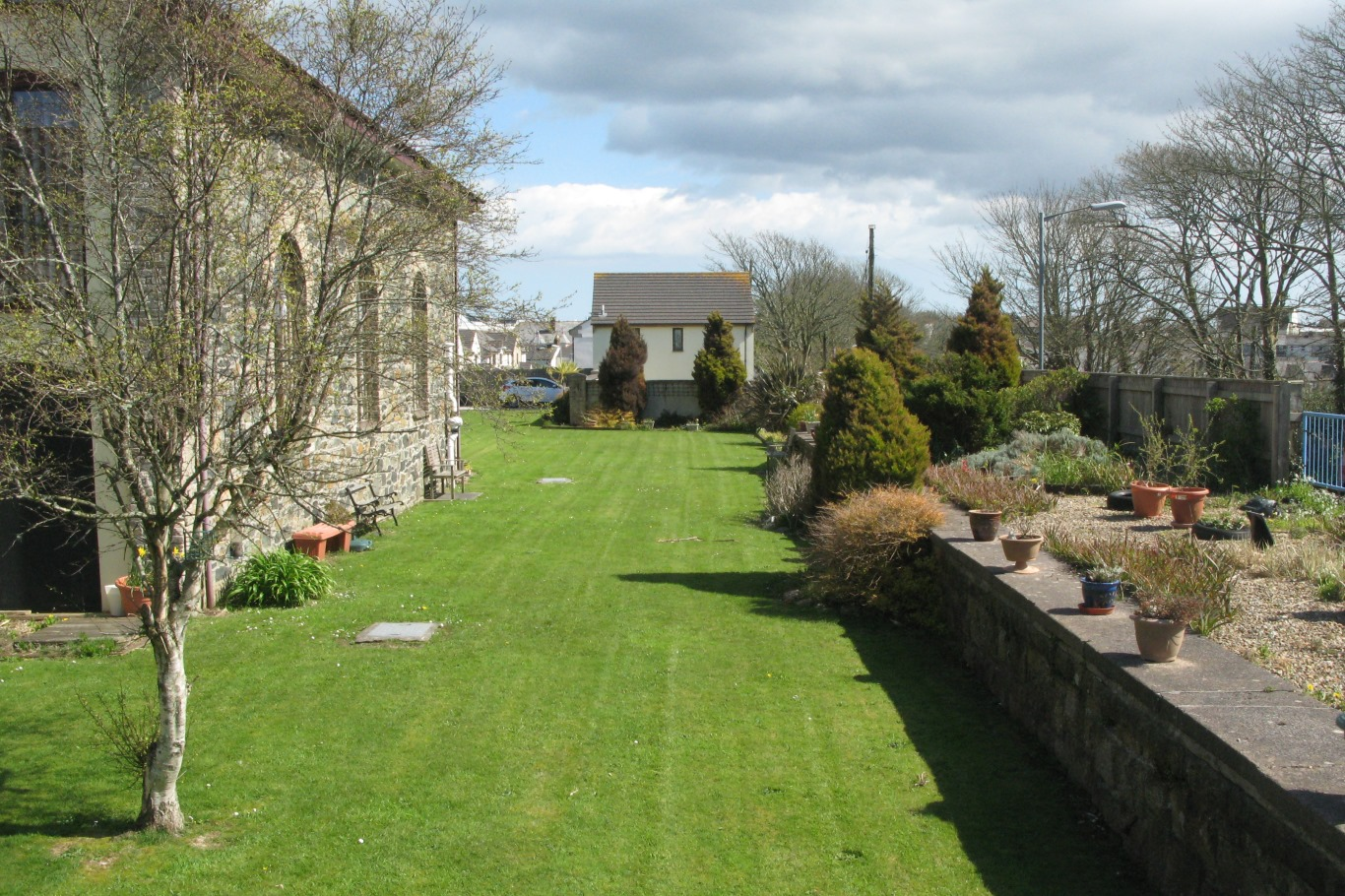
- Station site in 2016, goods shed on left and platform on right

General information
- Location: Helston, Cornwall; England
- Platforms: 1

Other information
- Status: Disused

History
- Pre-grouping: Great Western Railway
- Post-grouping: Great Western Railway

Key dates
- 1887: Opened
- 1962: Closed for passengers
- 1964: Closed for freight
Location

Helston railway station was the terminus of the Helston Railway in Cornwall, United Kingdom, which opened on the 9 May 1887 and during its time of operation was the most southerly railway station on the UK mainland. The line was operated by the Great Western Railway and was absorbed by that company in 1898. It closed to passengers on 5 November 1962 and to freight on 5 October 1964. Despite being a terminus station, Helston was built in the same manner as other stations (Praze and Nancegollan) on the line as a through station. This came from the original plan that the line would head towards The Lizard but this never happened and the station remained unchanged and always looked like a 'through' station until closure. The station secured its place in history when it became the first place in the country with a railway-operated bus service, the GWR road motor services meeting trains at the station and carrying passengers on towards The Lizard. In 1928 the service ran from Helston Station through Dodson's Gap (for Gunwalloe), Cury Cross Lanes (for Cury), Penhale, and Ruan Crossroads (for Cadgwith}, the fare to The Lizard being 1s 9d.

== Description ==
The station building was constructed of stone with a slate roof and four chimneys. On the platform side of the building a cantilever canopy ran for the full length of the building while a small canopy supported on brackets was provided over the main entrance. A post box was located on the end of the building. Opposite the station building was the goods shed, and at the up end of the platform was a signal box of brick and timber construction and an engine shed built of stone of sufficient size for a single engine with a water tower immediately in front. Further goods facilities were provided with a short good platform and a crane in the goods yard. The very furthest part of the line, and thus the most southerly point of any railway in mainland England was occupied by a carriage shed which was beyond the platform. When constructed, this was the only building within the Helston rural district, the boundary of which passed between the carriage shed and the platform.

The site of the station is now part of an old people's home. Part of the platform survives, along with the goods shed. There are still some rails embedded as boundary markers in the local area.

Preceding station	Historical railways	Following station
Truthall Halt	Great Western Railway; Helston Railway	Terminus

== Station Masters ==
The following people are known to have been Stations Masters at Helston Station.

- Lawrence C.W. Reed 1887 - 1889 (afterwards station master at Camborne)
- W.J. Cowan 1889- 1902
- Dan Silvester 1902 - 1909 (afterwards station master at Liskeard)
- F.W. French ca. 1910 - 1929
- Frederick Reginald Sherman 1929 - 1935 (afterwards station master at Redruth)
- C.H. Grant 1935 - ca. 1945
- W.H.S. Reynolds until 1950
- Arthur L.B. Bower from 1950 (formerly station master at Monmouth)
