= AP Diving =

British manufacturer of underwater diving equipment

AP Diving or Ambient Pressure Diving, formerly known as A.P.Valves, is a British manufacturer of diving equipment at Water-Ma-Trout in Helston, Cornwall, England. They produce a range of scuba and surface-supplied diving equipment including buoyancy compensator jackets and the Inspiration range of electronically controlled closed circuit diving rebreathers.

The firm started in 1969 making a valve to allow a diver to breathe from a stabiliser jacket buoyancy compensator's inflation cylinder. They progressed to making divers' adjustable buoyancy life-jackets and stabiliser jackets, and then other diving equipment such as rebreathers. and diving accessories etc.

They often exhibit at diving trade shows.

== Product lines ==
- "Inspiration" rebreathers have been in production since 1997. The earliest model, now known as the Inspiration classic, reached the end of its product support life in April 2017 after 20 years. It has been superseded by more recent models using different electronic control systems, which are backwards compatible with the original architecture.
- "Buddy" and "Commando" - recreational and military scuba buoyancy compensators.
- "Mk IV Jump Jacket" - a buoyancy compensator designed for use with surface supplied diving equipment.

== Awards ==
In January 2018 Martin Parker, Managing Director of AP Diving, received the European Underwater Federation Lavanchy Award at the Boot Show in Düsseldorf.
