= Chynhale =

Hamlet in Cornwall, England

Coordinates: 50.1305°N 5.3014°W

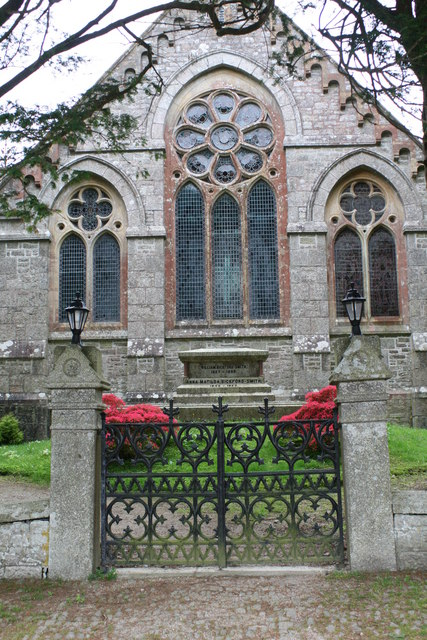
- Chynale Methodist Church in 2011

- Location within Cornwall
- Civil parish: Sithney
- Unitary authority: Cornwall
- Ceremonial county: Cornwall
- Region: South West
- Country: England
- Sovereign state: United Kingdom

Chynhale is a hamlet 2 miles (3.2 km) north west of Helston, Cornwall, England, in the civil parish of Sithney.

Chynale Methodist Church was built of granite in 1879 to the design of Redruth-based architect, James Hicks. It is Grade II listed. The entrance gates, pillars and flanking walls are separately listed. The gates were cast at the Tuckingmill Foundry. The church building is closed for worship. The final church service was announced for Easter Sunday 2015. In 2022, a proposal was made to remove the church's Sweetland organ and relocate it in St Mark’s Anglican Church, Florence, Italy.

In 1911 at a public meeting presided over by the chairman of Sithney parish council it was stated that 82 children were on the roll for Chynhale School and it had capacity for 132, but the County Education Committee had decided it was to be closed.
