= Sithney Green =

Hamlet in Cornwall, United Kingdom

Coordinates: 50°6′58″N 5°17′42″W

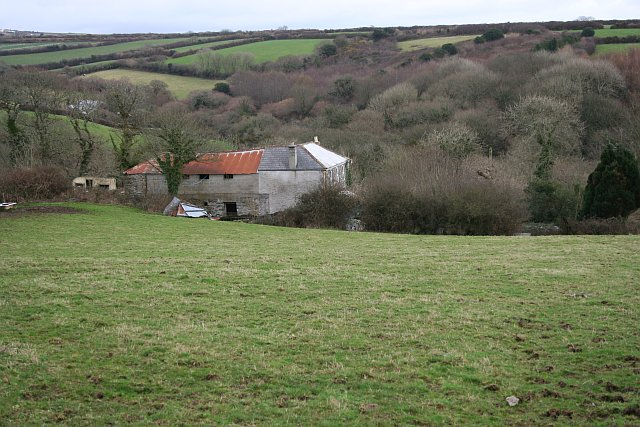
Sithney Green

Sithney Green is a hamlet in the parish of Sithney, Cornwall, England, United Kingdom.
