= Trevarno, Cornwall =

Private country estate in Cornwall, England

Coordinates: 50.125°N 5.301°W

Trevarno
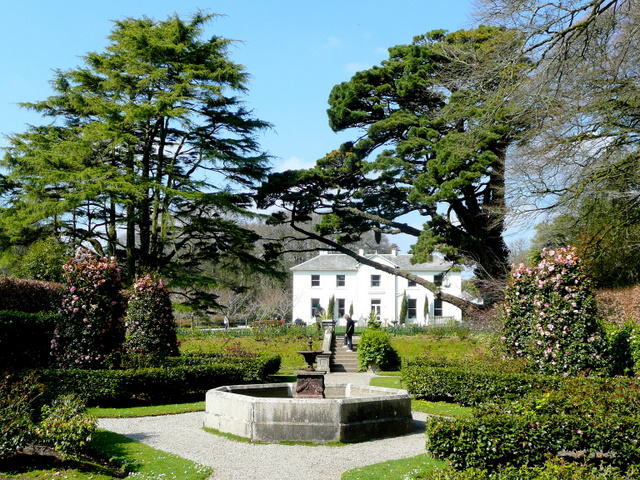
- Trevarno House
- Interactive map of Trevarno
- Location: Crowntown near Helston, Cornwall, England
- Area: 70 acres (28 ha)
- Opened: 1998
- Visitors: 80,000
- Status: Closed – now a private residence
- Collections: National daffodil collection Museum of Gardening

Trevarno is a private country estate in south-west Cornwall, England, UK, near the village of Crowntown, 2 miles (3.2 km) north-east of Helston. First developed in the 13th century, the estate was owned by a succession of families until 1994 when it was sold for development as a tourist attraction based around its extensive gardens. It was open to the public from 1998 until 2011, but the estate has since been broken up and the house and gardens are again a private residence.

== History ==
The estate lands were developed from 1246 when it was owned by Randolphus de Varno, Trevarno in the Cornish language means "farm/settlement of Varno." The main house was developed from 1296, with a Tudor architecture manor house built on the site; its east wing foundations are now under the conservatory and some of its walls are incorporated into the current main house. It was then owned by a series of notable families, including the Arundells from the mid-1500s for two hundred years. It was later owned by John Oliver, the father of Dr. William Oliver, the inventor of the Bath Oliver biscuit.

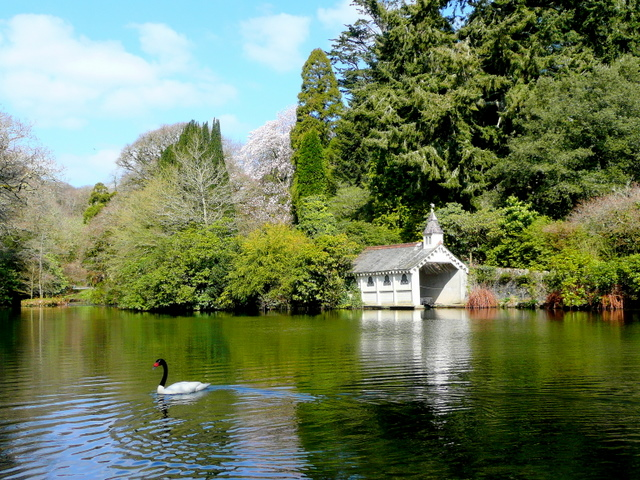
The classical view across the lake to the listed Victorian boathouse

In 1874 the estate was bought by William Bickford-Smith, a descendant of William Bickford, the inventor of the miner's safety fuse. Bickford-Smith was a rich local businessman turned Liberal politician, whose interests included tin mining and the Helston Railway, which ran through the estate and of which he was co-developer and chairman. He supplemented the existing well-developed Georgian garden to create a merger of Georgian-Victorian styles, adding:

- The lake and Victorian boathouse, which is now a listed building. Water runs down from the lake through a 1 mile (1.6 km) series of cascades to Trevarno Watermill.
- The sunken Italianate garden, which was redesigned in the 1960s
- Fountain Garden Conservatory: a sub-tropical plant preserve, formerly part of the house
- Over 30,000 trees

In the locally mild climate, rare tender plants, trees and shrubs could easily flourish.

== Tourist attraction 1998–2011 ==
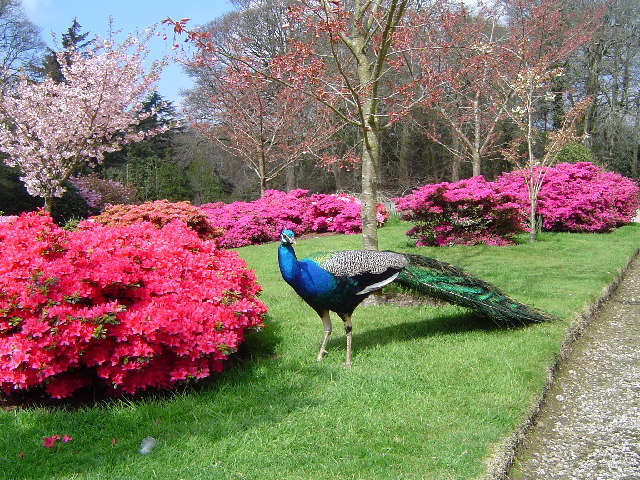
The gardens at Trevarno

After four generations of occupation, in 1994 the Bickford-Smith family sold the residual 750 acres (300 ha) estate to the two directors of a local electronics company. A programme of restoration began in 1995, with the intention of reopening the estate as a garden-based tourist attraction. The resultant 70 acres (28 ha) of publicly accessible grounds opened in 1998, and included:

- The preserved Georgian-Victorian main gardens
- The Italianate sunken garden
- The Victorian walled garden
- The Bog garden
- The lake and boathouse
- The sub-tropical fountain garden conservatory
- The grotto
- Woodland walks through the Serpentine Yew tree Tunnel and the extensive Pinetum
- A bluebell valley walk, and a daffodil walk which became part of the National Daffodil Collection

The National Museum of Gardening featured a number of themed displays:

- An historic gardening tools and implements collection claimed to be the biggest in England, with some dating back to the 17th century all the way through to the latest designs of lawn mowers
- Enamel garden signs, possibly the most extensive such exhibit in the world
- Historic seed catalogues

Additional attractions included:

- The Colin Gregory Vintage Toy Collection
- The Soap Collection: a collection and displays looking at soap and skincare products
- Trevarno Soap and Skincare Workshops where visitors could purchase hand-made fragrant soaps.

Open between April and October each year, the estate and attraction employed over 80 people, attracting over 80,000 visitors.

== Closure and sale ==
In October 2010, the owners put the estate on the market for £10 million. The proposed sale included the entire 723 acres (293 ha) grounds, including: seven tenant farms, ten additional tenanted houses, the main manor house, two lodges, extensive woodlands, a watermill, and the 26 acres (11 ha) gardens. The owners proposed to retain ownership of the associated organic skin care company.

However, with the estate held in a pension trust and with the owners unable to find a buyer, after the retirement of one of the co-owners the estate was closed to the public in April 2012 and sold off as separate lots. The manor house, two lodges, the watermill, the gardens, and a piece of woodland were marketed as a private residence for £4 million through Chesterton Humberts. By October 2012 most of the farms and houses had been sold, as had the core manor house estate as a private dwelling, thereby ending the estate's time as a tourist attraction. Not included in the sale was the estate's garden museum collection, a national-level significance collection of tools and memorabilia, which will be relocated to another institution.

Following the sale of the manor house, the Helston Railway which has 1 mile (1.6 km) of track running across the estate lands came to an agreement with the new owners to allow continuation of the operation of their line. This was subject to the closure of the Trevarno station, that had been developed with the previous owners to allow estate visitors access to the railway.
