= Water-Ma-Trout =

Coordinates: 50.1129°N 5.2701°W

Water-Ma-Trout is a road and an industrial estate on the northern edge of Helston in west Cornwall, England.

Theories about its name are:

- That its name started as Cornish dialect English for "wet my throat", here used as a name for a dry field.
- Earlier: that this name is a corruption of "waterman route", due to it being near the water supply towards one of the sources of the River Cober.
- That the name derives from a corruption of Welter-ma (from "wheal" and "man") and "Trout", the name of the miner.

== Industry ==
A range of industries are based around the estate, such as the scuba gear factory AP Diving and Helston Gunsmiths.
