= Nancegollan railway station =

Former railway station in England

Nancegollan
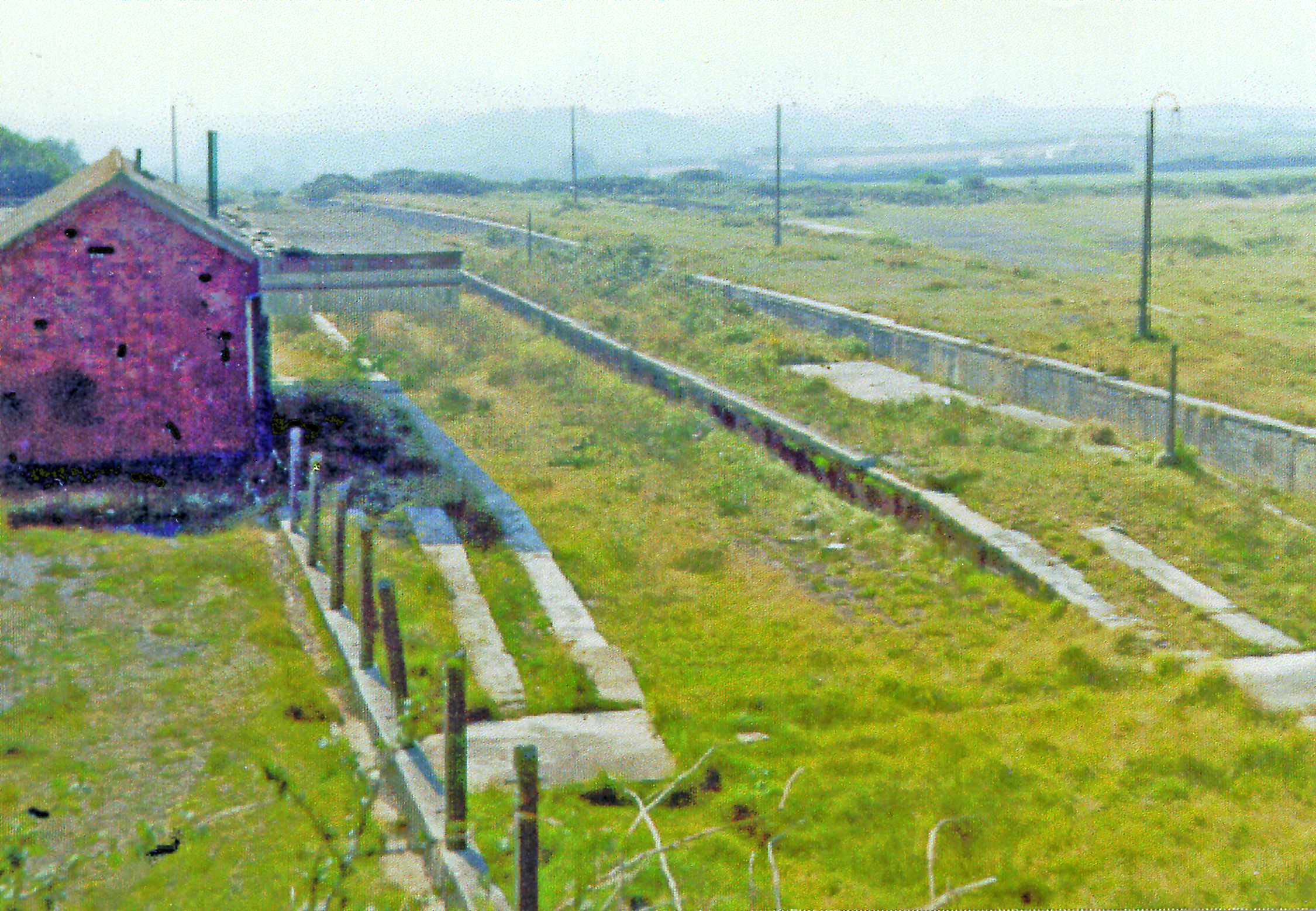

General information
- Location: Nancegollan, Cornwall; England
- Coordinates: 50.1426°N 5.3053°W
- Grid reference: SW639321
- Platforms: 2

Other information
- Status: Disused

History
- Original company: Helston Railway
- Pre-grouping: Great Western Railway
- Post-grouping: Great Western Railway

Key dates
- 9 May 1887: Opened
- 5 November 1962: Closed for passengers
- 5 October 1964: Closed for freight
Location

Nancegollan railway station located in Nancegollan, Cornwall served an important agricultural district and was also the railhead for the fishing port of Porthleven.

== History ==
The station opened on 9 May 1887 when the Helston Railway opened the line between Helston and Gwinear Road on the Great Western Railway mainline to Penzance.

The line was operated by the Great Western Railway and absorbed by that company on 2 August 1898.

Originally it had a single passenger platform on the upside and a goods loop without a platform; the connections were operated by a ground frame. In 1937 the facilities were considerably extended, with a full crossing facility for passenger trains and longer platforms on both lines, as well as a loop line behind the up platform and a large goods yard.

In 1941 the station's goods sidings were further modified and extended in connection with airfield construction in the locality, and a new signal box with a lever frame that had been relocated from the Cornish Main Line at St Germans. A second, metal, bridge was also built at this time to carry the road over the new goods yard access lines. A camping coach was positioned here by the Western Region from 1958 to 1962.

Due to the line's "uncoloured" classification, heavy locomotives such as GWR Classes 43XX 2-6-0 Tender Engine and 51XX 2-6-2T Tank Engines were allowed as far as Nancegollan only. Although larger locomotives did run past Nancegollan in the branch's dying days the Class 22s ran on the branch even though they were a GWR blue classification, higher than the branch line.

In April 1957, Nancegollan won £10 (£238.65 in today's money) in the British Railways Western Region Station Gardens Competition.

The branch was closed for passengers on 5 November 1962. Goods traffic continued for a further two years, finally ceasing on 5 October 1964; the track was lifted by mid-1965.

Preceding station	Historical railways	Following station
Praze	Great Western Railway; Helston Railway	Truthall Halt

== Station Masters ==
The following people are known to have been Station Masters at Nancegollan Station, with approximate dates show.

- S.J. Jeffery, Station Master (? - July 1955 - December 1957)
- A. Knight, Station Master (? - ?)
- T. Williams, Station Master (January 1958 - ?)

== The site today ==
Today the site of Nancegollan is an industrial estate. There are plans for the Helston Railway to extend the line into Nancegollen at some point.

== Gallery ==
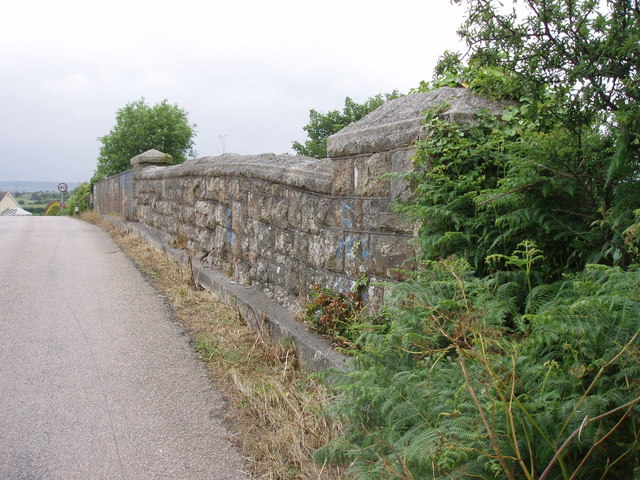
The bridge at Nancegollen is still standing.

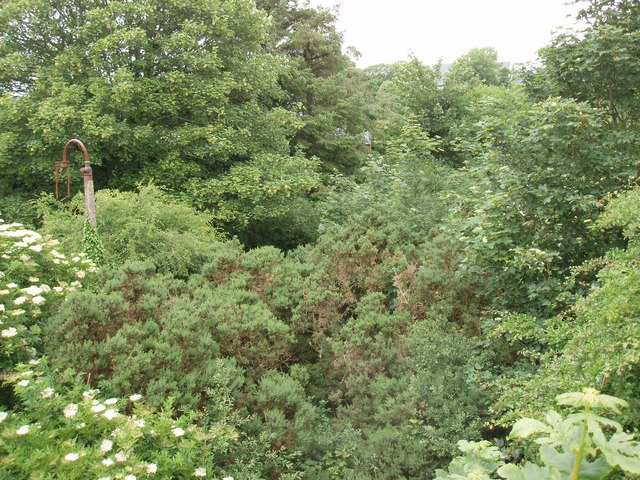
The site of Nancegollen station still with a lamp poking through the shrubbery

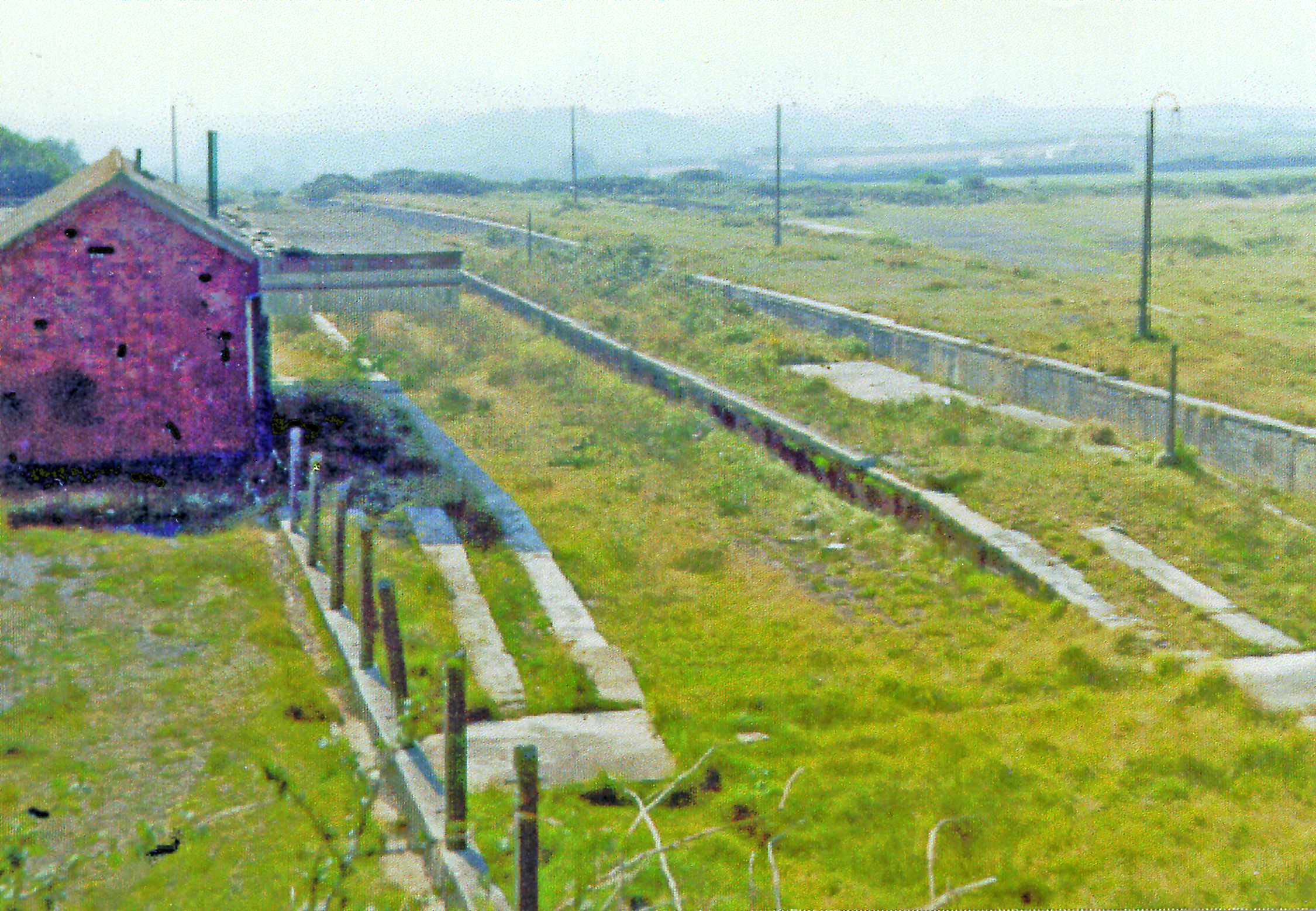
The site of the station in 1973, nine years after it closed

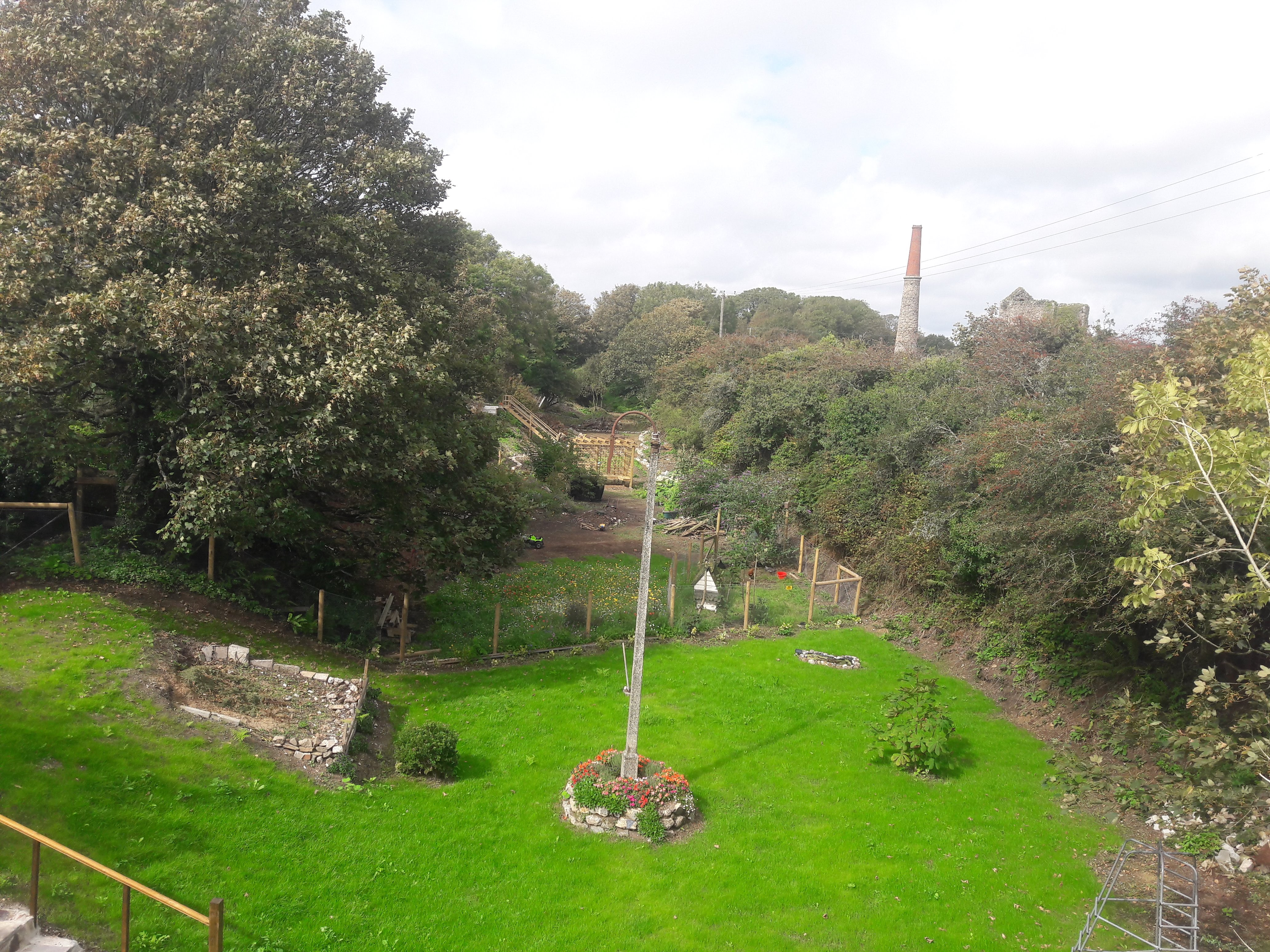
A Station lamp that can now be seen in a garden.
