= British Rail Class 103 =

British diesel multiple unit train, 1957-1983

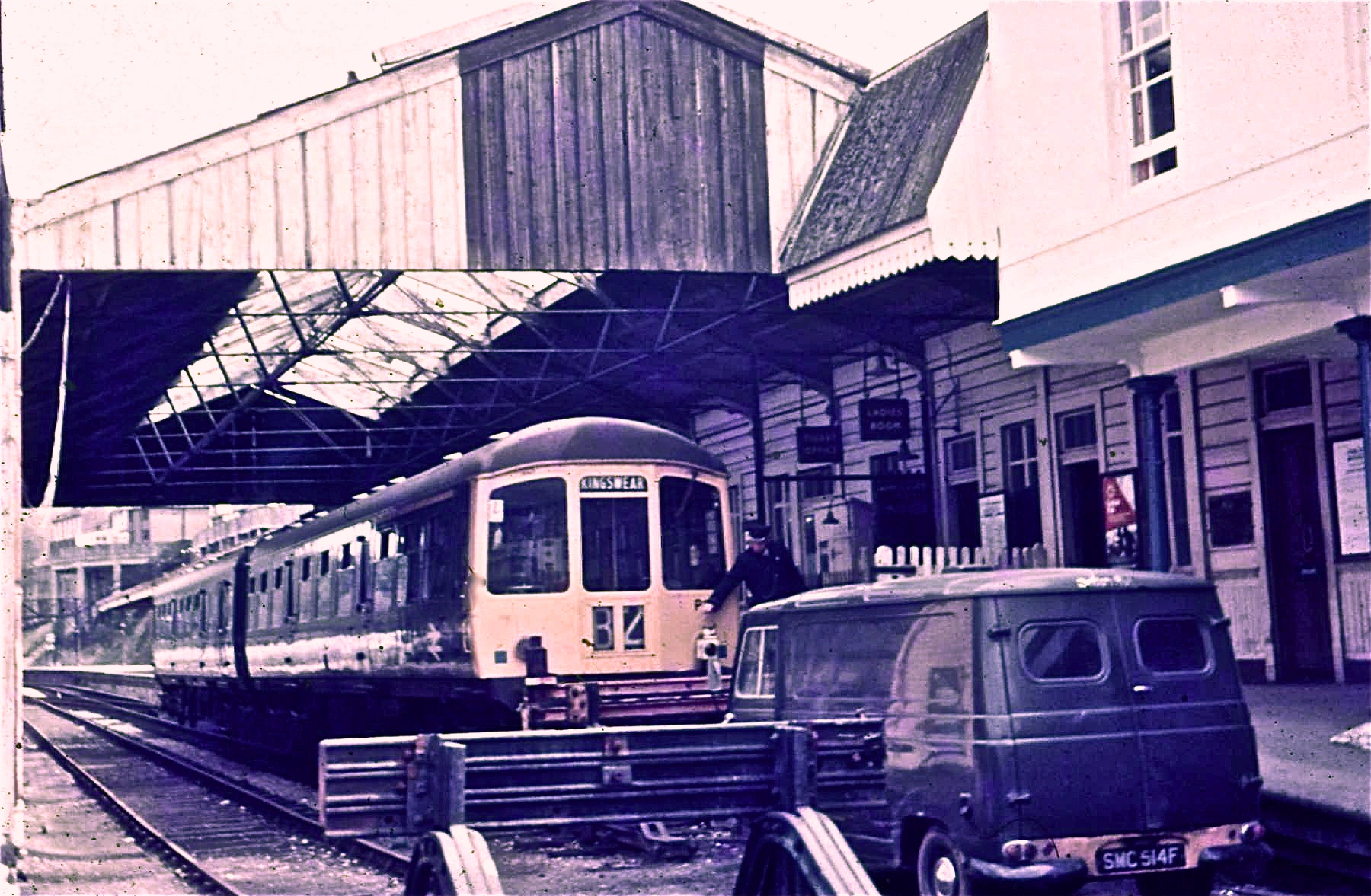
- A Class 103 at Kingswear station in 1972.
- In service: 1957–1983
- Manufacturer: Park Royal Vehicles
- Family name: First generation
- Replaced: Steam locomotives and carriages
- Number built: 20 sets (40 cars)
- Formation: 2 car sets: DMBS-DTCL
- Capacity: DMBS: 52 second class; DTCL: 16 first and 48 second class
- Operator: British Rail

Specifications
- Car length: 57 ft 6 in (17.53 m)
- Width: 9 ft 3 in (2.82 m)
- Maximum speed: 70 mph (110 km/h)
- Weight: DMBS: 33 long tons 8 cwt (74,800 lb or 33.9 t); DTCL: 26 long tons 7 cwt (59,000 lb or 26.8 t)
- Prime mover: Two BUT (AEC) 6-cylinder diesels
- Power output: 150 bhp (112 kW) each engine
- Transmission: Mechanical: 4 speed epicyclic gearbox
- Braking system: Vacuum
- Coupling system: Screw-link couplings, British Standard gangways
- Multiple working: ■ Blue Square
- Track gauge: 4 ft 8 1/2 in (1,435 mm)

The British Rail Class 103 diesel multiple units were built by Park Royal Vehicles with diesel engines by British United Traction (BUT). Ordered in the first half of 1955, 20 of these sets were built by Park Royal at the Crossley Motors works in Stockport of the ACV Group. They consisted of a power car and a driving trailer. Standard BUT equipment was fitted, with 'A' type engines.

A two-car set with 16 first class and 100 second class seats weighed just under 60 long tons, representing 1,150 lb (520 kg) a seat and had 5 hp per ton of empty weight or 4.35 hp per ton when full.

== Operations ==
They were allocated new to the London Midland Region of British Railways, spending most of their time at Chester. The first deliveries went to traffic in the Llandudno area, allocated to Llandudno Junction in early 1958. This is believed to be an indirect consequence of unit shortages as a result of bogie problems with the BRCW units [Trains Illustrated 1958]. By the end of the same year they were all allocated to Ryecroft for the routes radiating from Walsall. These services were dieselised on 17 November that year [Trains Illustrated Jan 1959 p53]. The last four sets, including W50413 and W56169 the surviving full set, were transferred to the Western Region of British Railways, and worked on the Kingswear Branch having been based out of Laira Depot.

== Preservation ==
Due to asbestos insulation, only three Class 103 vehicles survive in preservation. 50413 and 56169 are currently being restored by the Helston Railway Diesel Group for use on the Helston branch line. 56160 is privately preserved. Three other vehicles were preserved but have since been scrapped.

Number	Type	Location	Owner	Condition	Image	Comments
50413	DMBS	Helston Railway	HRDG	Non-operational, used as a buffet car	Numbers W50413 and W56169 sit at the Helston Railway's Prospidnick Halt.	Restoration underway, engines being looked at
56160	DTCL	Bodfari, Denbighshire	Private	Non-operational		Ex-Viaduct Inspection Unit
56169	DTCL	Helston Railway	HRDG	Non-operational, used as a waiting room		In process of restoration, near complete

Preserved and later scrapped
Number	Type	Location	Owner	Scrapped	Image
50397	DMBS	Private	Swansea	September 2009	
50414	DMBS	West Somerset Railway	West Somerset Railway	1993	
56168	DTS	West Somerset Railway	West Somerset Railway	1993	
