= Nancegollan =

Coordinates: 50°08′31″N 5°18′32″W

Nancegollan: Cornish: Nansigolen
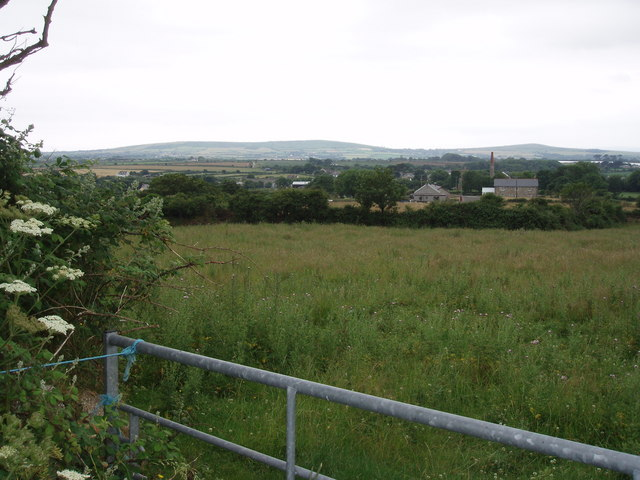
- Fields near Nancegollan

- Location within Cornwall
- OS grid reference: SW637321
- Civil parish: Crowan
- Unitary authority: Cornwall
- Ceremonial county: Cornwall
- Region: South West
- Country: England
- Sovereign state: United Kingdom

Nancegollan (Cornish: Nansigolen) is a village in the civil parish of Crowan in west Cornwall, England. Nancegollan is on the B3303 road and south-east of Leedstown.

The railway line from Helston to Hayle passed through the village (closed in 1964). Nancegollan station was the largest of the four stations on the branch.

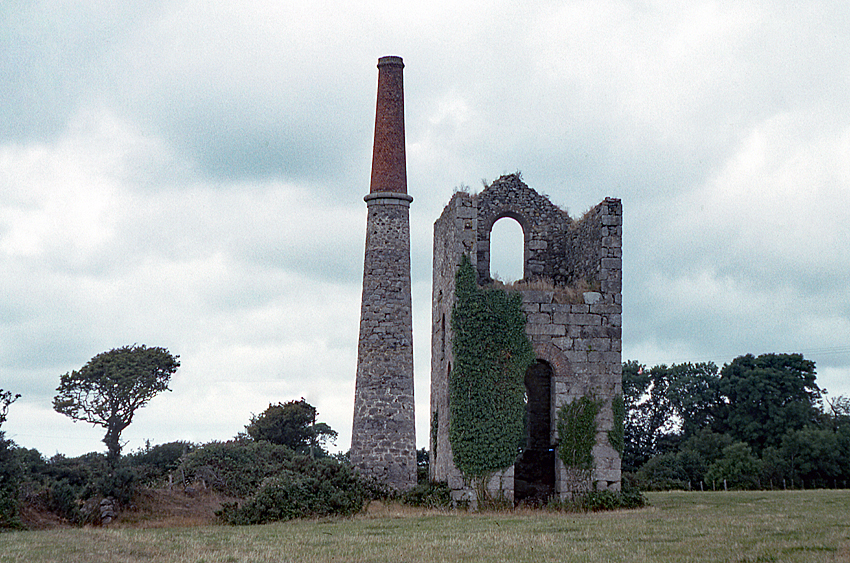
Nancegollan Mine engine house

On Polcrebo Downs is the engine house of the Polcrebo Mine which was reopened in 1882 and still working in the 1890s; but is of very ancient origin.

The name Nancegollan comes from the Cornish language words nans, meaning 'valley', and igolen, meaning 'whetstone'.

== History ==
During World War II there was a single occurrence of bombs being dropped on Nancegollan. Late on the night of 22 August 1940 a mixture of high-explosive bombs and incendiaries were dropped in the vicinity although there is no record of any damage.
