= Crowntown =

Coordinates: 50.130°N 5.309°W

Crowntown: Cornish: Tregurun
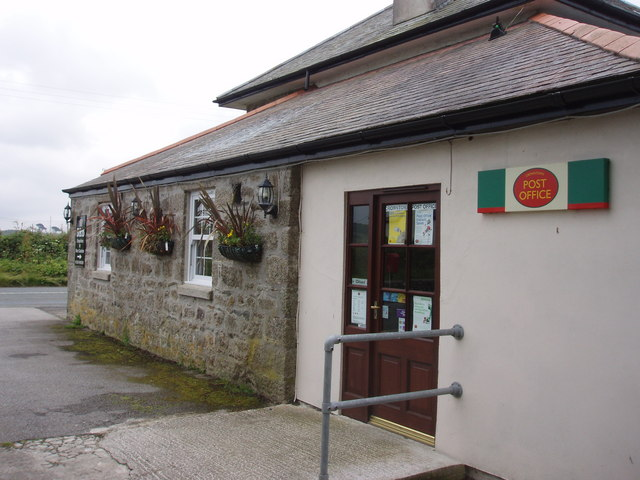
- Post office at the Crown Inn, Crowntown

- Location within Cornwall
- OS grid reference: SW636308
- Civil parish: Sithney
- Unitary authority: Cornwall
- Ceremonial county: Cornwall
- Region: South West
- Country: England
- Sovereign state: United Kingdom
- Post town: Helston
- Postcode district: TR13 0

Crowntown (Cornish: Tregurun) is a hamlet on the B3303 road south of Nancegollan in west Cornwall, England. It is in the civil parish of Sithney.

== Cornish wrestling ==
Cornish wrestling tournaments, for prizes, have been held in Crowntown for centuries, for example at the Crown Inn.
