= Helston Railway =

Former branch line in Cornwall, England, now a heritage railway

The Helston Railway

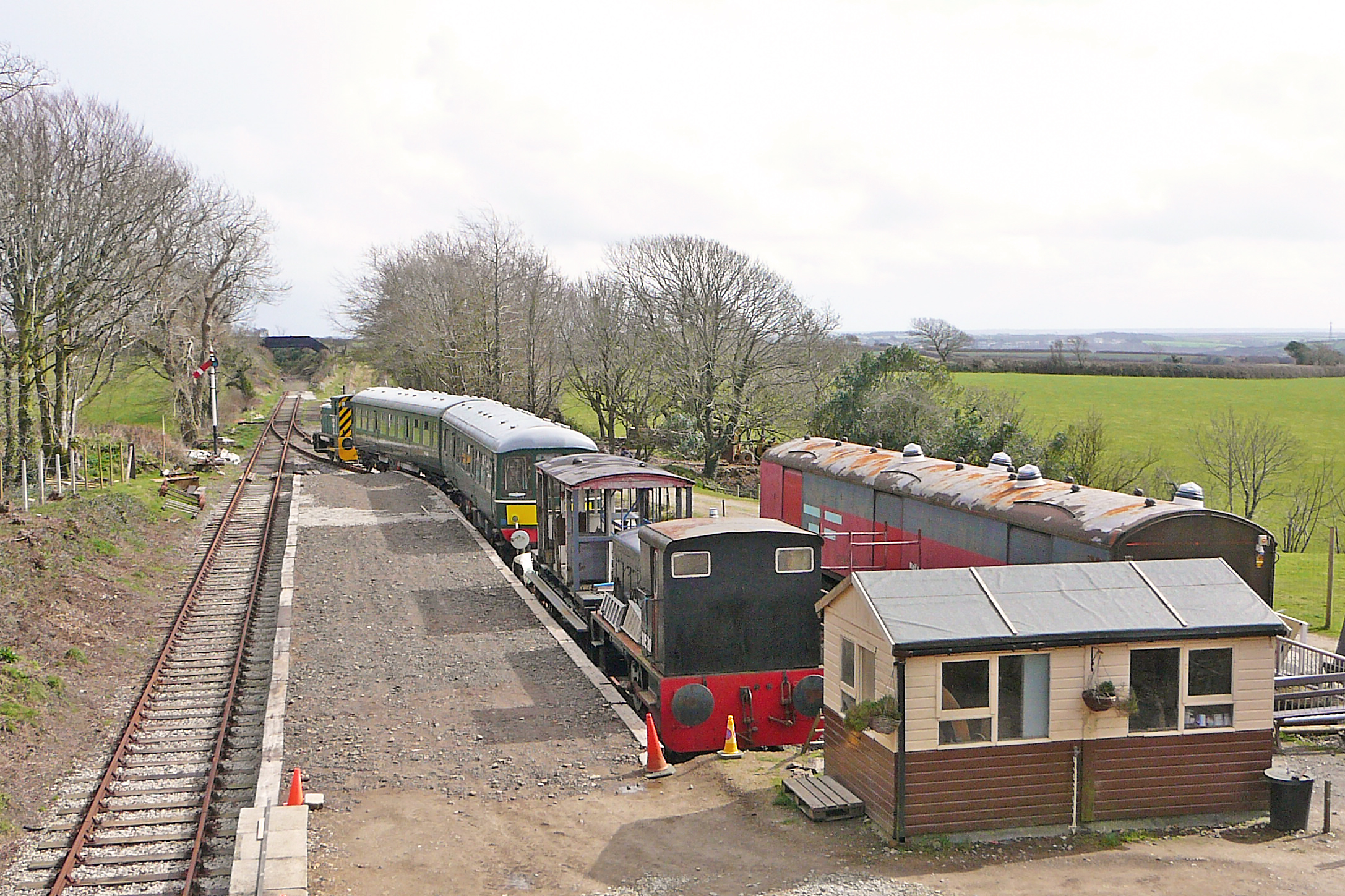
- View of the now disused station at Trevarno in April 2010
- Terminus: Helston railway station

Commercial operations
- Original gauge: 4 ft 8 1/2 in (1,435 mm) standard gauge

Preserved operations
- Stations: 2
- Length: 1.5 mi (2.4 km)
- Preserved gauge: 4 ft 8 1/2 in (1,435 mm) standard gauge

Commercial history
- Opened: 1882
- Closed to passengers: 1962
- Closed: 1964

Preservation history
- 2010: HR granted Light Railway Order
- 2011: HR re-opens
- 2012: HR relocates (upwards) into 'a nearby' Prospidnick
- 2018: Truthall Halt formally opened by HRH Duke of Gloucester
- Headquarters: Prospidnick

Website
- Official website

The Helston Railway (Cornish: Hyns-horn Hellys) is a heritage railway in Cornwall which aims to rebuild and preserve as much as possible of the former GWR Helston Railway between Nancegollen and Water-Ma-Trout on the outskirts of Helston. It is operated by the Helston Railway Preservation Company using members of the Helston Railway Preservation Society.

The railway was a 8 1/2-mile (13.7 km) long 4 ft 8 1/2 in (1,435 mm) standard gauge railway branch line and is the southernmost branch line in the United Kingdom. It opened in 1887 and was absorbed by the Great Western Railway in 1898, continuing in existence as the Helston branch, and closing to passengers in 1962 and to goods in 1964.

It was built to open up the agricultural district of south-west Cornwall, joining Helston to the main line railway network at Gwinear Road, between Penzance and Truro.

Its predominant business was agricultural, but in summer it carried holidaymakers, and its terminus at Helston was the railhead for a pioneering road connection service to the Lizard. During the Second World War there was considerable goods traffic at Nancegollan, sponsored by the Admiralty.

The current Heritage Railway has won a number of awards including: The Ian Allan Publishing Heritage Railway of the Year 2010, The Heritage Railway Association Publication & Media Award 2012 and The Heritage Railway Association Small Groups Award 2019.

== Original railway ==
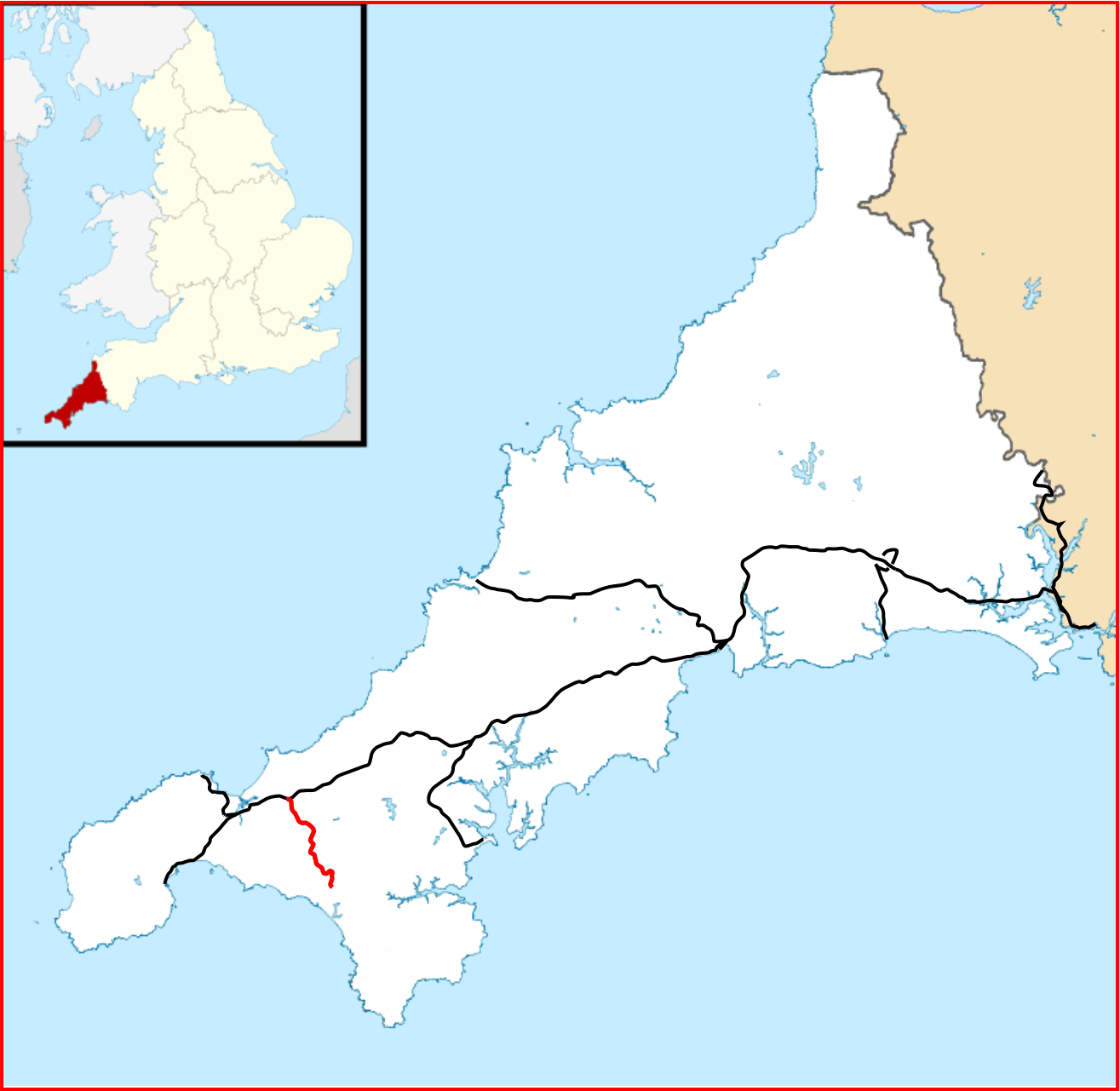
The Helston line (in red) and current railways in Cornwall

The line ran from Helston, in south-west Cornwall (50.1070°N 5.2713°W), to a junction with the main line of the Great Western Railway at Gwinear Road (50.1972°N 5.3475°W). The connection there faced Penzance.

The line was 8 miles 67 chains (14.2 km) in length. As a purely local line running through difficult terrain, it was heavily curved and graded. Although Helston is an important town, most of the intermediate area was dedicated to agriculture, with sparse population, and the terminus at Helston was some distance from the seaside.

The main line at Gwinear Road gave direct access to London and the rest of England, on the route that is now known as the Cornish Main Line.

=== History ===
Before the advent of the railway, Helston was an important centre for tin and copper mining, as well as being the hub of an area of considerable agricultural production. Local businessmen observed the success that followed the opening of early railways elsewhere in Cornwall and further afield, and from 1825 a succession of schemes for tramroads and railways were put forward, many of them oriented towards Falmouth or Penryn and the River Fal estuary because of the harbour facilities there (and later, the arrival of the Cornwall Railway, enabling onward transport of minerals by coastal shipping). All of these schemes fell by the wayside due to the high cost of crossing the difficult terrain; after the collapse following the Railway Mania in the mid-1840s, money became increasingly scarce, and moreover the shallower seams in the mines began to become worked out, reducing the profitability of local mines.

In 1879, a rough survey was made of the proposed route and it was estimated that the railway could be constructed for £80,000, with the most expensive portion being a viaduct over the River Cober. The Helston Railway Company was formed later that year, with a share capital of £70,000, with the object of building a standard gauge railway to Helston, not from the Falmouth area but from Gwinear Road on the West Cornwall line. The Great Western Railway was friendly towards this line, and they agreed to work the line when built.

Helston Railway Act 1880
- Act of Parliament
- Parliament of the United Kingdom
- Long title: An Act for authorising the Construction of a Railway from the Gwinear Road Station of the West Cornwall Railway Company to Helston; and for other purposes.
- Citation: 43 & 44 Vict. c. xlviii

Dates
- Royal assent: 9 July 1880

Text of statute as originally enacted

The line received its act of Parliament, the Helston Railway Act 1880 (43 & 44 Vict. c. xlviii), on 9 July 1880, and work was expected to start in the spring of 1881. The first sod was cut at a ceremony on 22 March 1882 and it was hoped that the line would be completed in about eighteen months to two years. The intended stations were Praze, Nancegollan, Prospidnick and Helston. In January 1883 the directors inspected the line, Prospidnick bridge was described as a massive granite structure 40 feet (12 m) high. Roads had to be diverted and new roads made, and the estimated cost was nearly £1,000.

Work proceeded, but the original contractor found himself in difficulties early in 1884 and work stopped for a period, but it resumed under Lang & Son of Liskeard.

Even as late as 1886, there was debate over the site of the Helston station; the site actually adopted, in Godolphin Road, was some distance to the east of the town centre. Some interests had proposed instead a location nearer the town; however the incremental cost would have been considerable and the proposal was finally dropped. The station was built as potentially a through station, with the idea of extension to the Lizard. This idea was revived from time to time, but was never acted upon.

The line was opened for the first service train on 9 May 1887.

=== The line in action ===
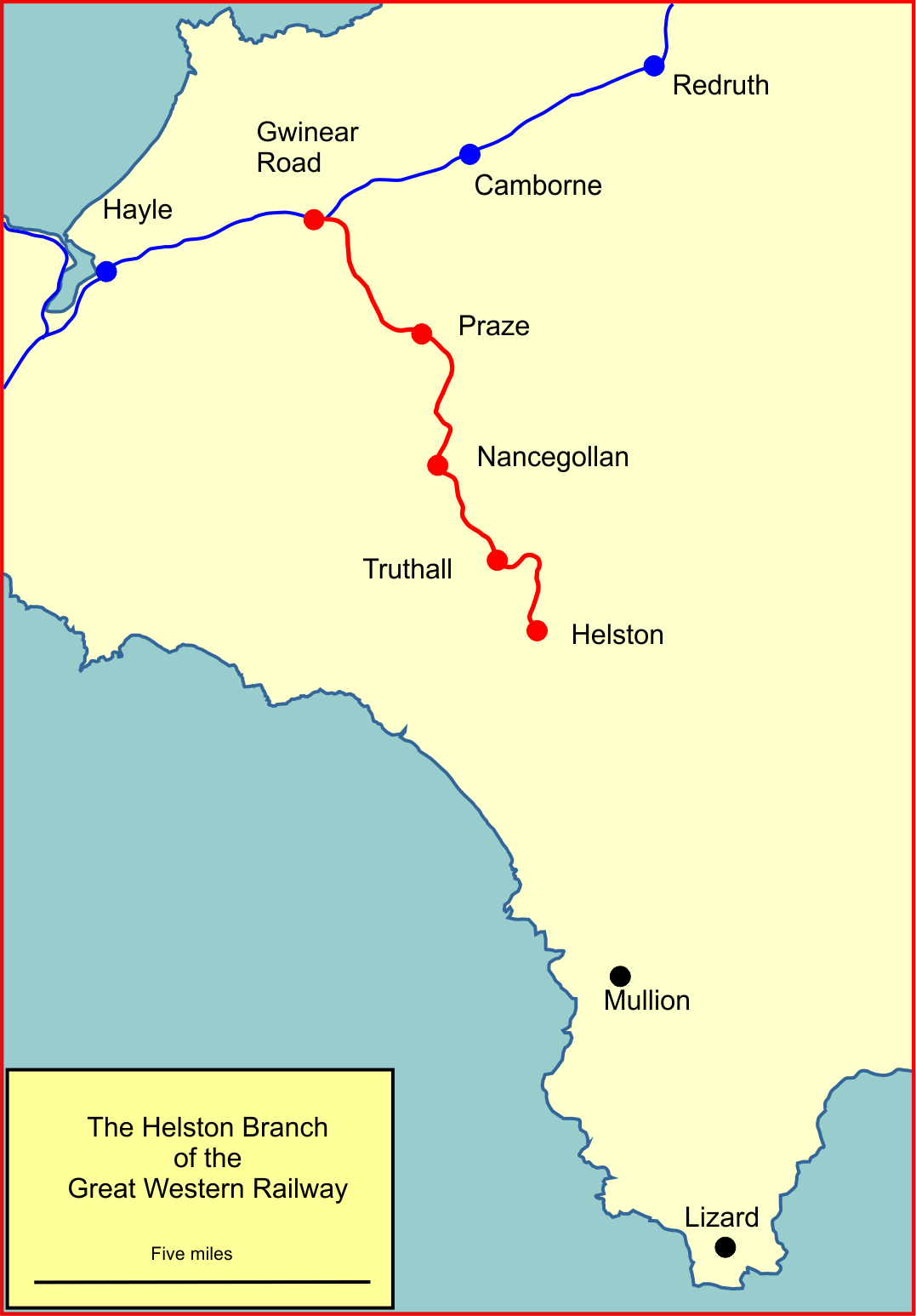
Route map of the Helston branch

When the line was opened there were two intermediate stations at Praze (serving the villages of Praze-an-Beeble and Crowan) and Nancegollan. In 1905, Truthall Halt was opened close to the hamlet of Trannack and less than 2 miles (3.2 km) north of Helston. There was also a ticket collecting platform just short of Helston until the end of 1902.

The only significant structure on the line was the Cober Viaduct, more properly known as the Lowertown Viaduct, 373 feet (114 m) long and with six arches.

The first passenger guard on the railway was Mr Sainthill Lindsey who worked until 1921, and was briefly recalled in 1926 during the general strike.

=== Praze ===
Praze (Cornish: Pras an Bibel) had only a single platform, 223 feet (68 m) long, on the up side of the line; there was a goods line formed as a loop, controlled by ground frame, on the down side.

=== Nancegollan ===
Nancegollan Railway Station (Cornish: Nansigolen) served an important agricultural district and also was the railhead for the fishing port of Porthleven. Originally it had a single passenger platform on the up side and a goods loop without a platform; the connections were operated by ground frame. In 1937 the facilities were considerably extended, with a full crossing facility for passenger trains and longer platforms on both lines, as well as a loop line behind the up platform and a large goods yard.

In 1941, the station's goods sidings were further modified and extended in connection with airfield construction in the locality, and a new signal box with a lever frame that had been relocated from the Cornish Main Line at St Germans. A second, metal, bridge was also built at this time to carry the road over the new goods yard access lines.

=== Truthall Halt ===
A latecomer to the passenger facilities on the branch, Truthall Halt (Cornish: Gorta Treyudhel) was opened on 3 July 1905, at a location about one and three-quarters miles (2.8 km) north of Helston; it served the village of Trannack and also Truthall Manor. It was renamed Truthall Platform in July 1906 and reverted to Truthall Halt in the 1960s. Some tickets referred to it as Truthall Bridge Halt. It had a single platform 84 feet (26 m) long on the down side of the line, though it was shortened later to about 50 feet (15 m).

=== Helston ===
Laid out as a through station for the possible extension to the Lizard, Helston station had a single platform on the up side of the line; there was an engine release line, with goods facilities on the east side of the station. There was also a carriage shed for the two-coach branch train, and a single-road engine shed built in 1887, lasting until 1963. The proposals for a light railway extension to the Lizard in the 1890s, authorised by the Lizard Light Railway Order 1898, were not pursued.

Helston station was much used by service personnel based at RNAS Culdrose from 1947. The Royal Navy Air station is on the southern margin of Helston. If sufficient money had been given to extend to RNAS Culdrose, the line might have been saved.

=== Absorption by the Great Western Railway ===
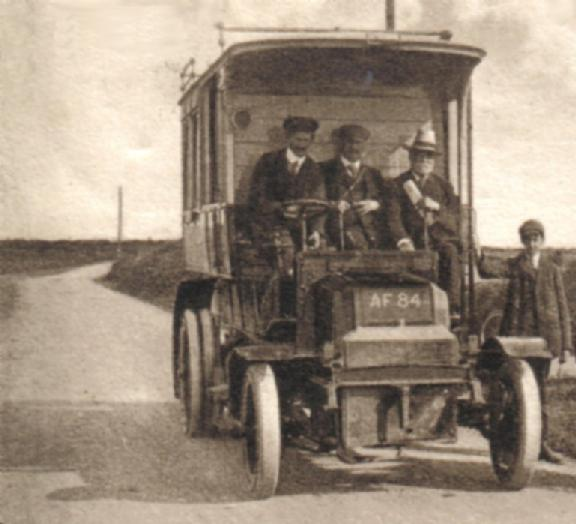
GWR bus AF84 on Helston service

The line had been worked by the Great Western Railway (GWR) from the outset, and on 1 July 1898 the line was vested in the GWR, the original Helston company being dissolved.

The Great Western Railway operated a pioneering road passenger connection to Mullion and the Lizard from 17 August 1903, and a Porthleven connection was added in 1909, and surrounding villages were also served. There was also an extensive van service for goods traffic to and from the railway, developed into a motor lorry service from about 1925.

A fragment of the GWR route map from about 1930 is given above, and shows several "road motor routes" radiating from Helston: there was a route to Porthleven and Breage; to Penhale (a small settlement east of Mullion, not the larger place near Indian Queens), Lizard and Lizard Point, and to Mullion; and Coverack and St Keverne, and to Manaccan; and to Falmouth and to Redruth.

The GWR formed a joint venture with the National Omnibus & Transport Company, forming the Western National Omnibus Company Ltd in 1929, and the GWR services were transferred to Western National. The GWR retained its shares in Western National until nationalisation of the railways in 1948.

=== Operation ===
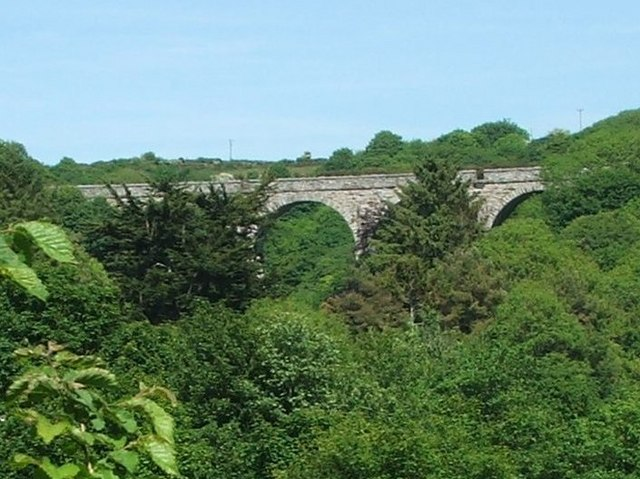
Cober Valley viaduct

The branch was "uncoloured"—the lightest engine weight classification—but this was relaxed to permit 45XX 2-6-2T locomotives to operate, and these were the general motive power. 43XX 2-6-0s and 51XX 2-6-2Ts were allowed as far as Nancegollan only. In the line's final years, Class 22 diesel locomotives were used to haul passenger and goods trains.

The line was single throughout, and several of the trains crossed at Nancegollan; from the opening of the passing loop there, the line was operated as two block sections, with signal boxes at Helston, Nancegollan and Gwinear Road East.

The line was sharply curved and steeply graded, with ruling gradients of 1 in 60 (16.7‰) and 1 in 54 (18.5‰).

In 1922, there were eight trains in each direction on the line; by 1939, this had been improved to ten (Monday to Friday) and eleven on Saturdays. The first train of the day started from Helston, as there was a small engine shed there. The journey time was typically 25 minutes, and the general speed limit was 30 miles per hour (48 km/h)

Goods traffic on the branch was heavy, accounting for about two-thirds of the branch's revenue. The primary traffic was agricultural, whist during the war years, and particularly during the D-Day preparations, Nancegollan saw extensive military traffic.

Local trains rarely ventured off the branch. In 1958, there were nine down and eight up trains Monday to Friday; the last up train was formed of two sets of rolling stock, and two trains each way were mixed (passenger and goods). The 1:15 p.m. Helston to Gwinear Road had to be given special attention as it had a three-minute connection at Gwinear Road with the up Royal Duchy express for London. (The "up" direction was towards Gwinear Road.)

On Saturdays in that year there were fourteen down and eleven up trains, with three up trains running with double the stock. All of this was accomplished with two B-set two coach sets.

=== Closure ===
The branch was closed for passengers on 3 November 1962. Goods traffic continued for a further two years, finally ceasing on 4 October 1964; the track was lifted by mid-1965.

== Preservation ==
The original concept to re-open the branch was in 1994 when Mart Hew from Helston and officials from British Rail, surveyed the line with the idea of a feasibility study. It was decided that due to the amount of work needed and the possible revenue that could be generated, it was not worth the effort and the project was dropped. In 2002 the Helston Railway Preservation Society was formed with about 12 members and on 28 April 2005, 40 years after the line was dismantled, work began clearing the overgrown vegetation.

The line was reopened for passengers in December 2011 for the Trevarno Gardens Winter Wonderland. As of November 2017 1 mile (1.6 km) of track had been relaid and is being used for public passenger rides from Prospidnick via Trevarno to Truthall Halt.

The line is being rebuilt by volunteers and is funded by proceeds from passenger rides, donations and membership subscriptions, and by members who buy shares in the Helston Railway Company Ltd. Funds are also generated by the railway shop and a buffet. The Preservation Society gained Charity status in March 2012.

In 2016, planning permission was granted to extend the track and build new platforms and sidings at Prospidnick as well as to rebuild the halt at Truthall. Truthall Halt was completed by November 2017 and officially opened by HRH The Duke of Gloucester on 5 April 2018.

In January 2018, calls were made to reinstate the line as part of the National Rail network.

In March 2020, an unsuccessful bid was made to the Restoring Your Railway fund to get funds for a feasibility study into reinstating the line.

=== Along the line ===
- Nancegollen – New site proposed, as old (original site) is now redeveloped.
- Trevarno Farm – New operational base and public car park
  - It is proposed that a new station will be constructed at Trevarno Farm which will be opened.
- Prospidnick Halt – This is only a temporary platform and is current terminus of the Helston Railway, though this halt may close when the proposed Trevarno Farm, located just a little north of the halt, opens.
- Trevarno station (Cornish: Trevranow) (now request station) – This is one third of the way along the line and was until 21 October 2012 the main operational base of the Railway, and where passengers started their journeys. Now passengers access the station via a footbridge known as Black Bridge, off a public footpath.
- Truthall Halt
  - Reopened 16 March 2017. Platform cleared, reconstructed and painstakingly restored to its former glory (Great Western style).
- Helston (Water-Ma-Trout)
  - It is intended that the preserved line will eventually be restored "across the 4 arch Cober Viaduct" and right onto the outskirts of Helston (where a new and "permanent-replacement" station maybe proposed as the former Helston site itself now lies within private land and redevelopment), however this may take many years.

=== Current status ===
To January 2024:

- The re-laid permanent way is now 1 1/4 miles (2.0 km) long from Prospidnick Halt to Truthall Halt.
- William Murdoch, an 0-4-0 Peckett steam shunting locomotive has been purchased and is undergoing restoration work. It is unknown when it will be operational as the rebuild is currently on hold due to other projects taking priority.
- Truthall Halt has been painstakingly rebuilt as an exact replica of the original halt.
- The Trevarno Estate was sold on 22 October 2012, having been purchased by a buyer who is using the estate as a private house. The railway now operates from a new temporary platform 540 yards (490 m) up the line at Prospidnick. The railway has also constructed a new public car park 200 yards (180 m) from the platform.
- The platform at Trevarno is now a request station but the sidings remain and will be used for storage of stock and some maintenance operations. An engine shed has been be constructed here.
- It is hoped that restoration will continue south within a few years to Water-Ma-Trout just near Helston; this would also include restoring the old Cober Viaduct.

By April 2018, the Railway had secured the use of the Peckett 'Kilmersdon' for the 2018 season from the Somerset and Dorset Joint Railway Museum at Washford station, and returned to its owners in March 2021. In August 2019, the Railway purchased a further one-quarter mile (0.40 km) of trackbed past Truthall Halt and began clearance with the help of volunteers from RNAS Culdrose.

== Rolling stock ==
The line has thirteen rail vehicles on site: a two-car Park Royal (BR Class 103) DMU, a two-car Bed-Pan (BR Class 127) DMU, two Ruston & Hornsby 165DS 0-4-0 diesel shunters, a center car from a Pressed Steel (Class 117) DMU, A Mark 1 Suburban Brake, A R4 Peckett 0-4-0ST, A B3 Peckett 0-6-0ST, Kingswood, two BR 20 ton standard brake van, a Type 17A Wickham Trolley and two Flatbed Wagons. The Class 103, Class 117 and Rustons are owned by the Railway, With the Mark 1 Suburban owned by the South Devon Railway, and the Wickham Trolly owned by the Rail Trolley Trust. The rolling stock that is not owned by the Railway, are on either long or short-term loan.

=== Park Royal Class 103 ===
HRDG's first purchase was a British Rail Class 103 DMU, one of only two left in preservation and the only one in a near-working condition. It has been protected by painting, but is not currently under restoration. When purchased from the West Somerset Railway, it was little more than a shell. It is currently in British Rail (BR) green livery. The individual cars are Driving Motor Brake Second (DMBS) 50413 and Driving Motor Lavatory Composite (DTCL) 56169. On 12 October 2008, one of the engines was started for the first time.

=== Ruston locomotive 327974 ===
This is of two Ruston shunter locomotives owned by the HRDG is number 327974. It has been restored, and has had a livery repaint into BR Blue. The locomotive is currently in use. It has been liveried with the number 97649. Was retired around 2020–2023

=== Ruston locomotive 395305 ===
The second of the Ruston 165DS 0-4-0 locomotives is build number 395305. It is out of service while being vacuum brake fitted. It is painted in a green livery.

=== BR 20-ton standard brake van ===
HRDG's newest purchase is a BR 20-ton standard brake van, B954673. It had been in a very poor state and has undergone major restoration works which were completed in November 2011; it is in brown. The van was put into use as soon as it was completed and is now carrying passengers on the line.

=== Rolling stock summary ===
Number	Class	Image	Type	Livery	Status	Notes
50143	Class 103		Diesel multiple unit (DMU), driving coach	British Railways (BR) Green with Yellow warning panels	Static, in use as buffet	
56169	Class 103	British Rail class 103 numbers W50413 and W56169 sit at the Helston Railway's Prospidnick Halt.	DMU, driving coach	BR Green with Yellow warning panels	Static, in use as a buffet	
59521	Class 117		DMU, centre coach	Primer	Stored out of service, under occasional long term maintenance	This coach has been vandalised, window smashed and graffitied on. Stripped of all interior features ready for repair.
51616	Class 127		DMU, driving coach	BR Maroon	in use as hauled stock, on arrival of its partner, it will run as a proper DMU again, possibly to be painted into a more appropriate livery.	This unit arrived from the Great Central Railway in January 2020.
51622	Class 127		DMU, driving coach	BR Green with Speed Whiskers	Arrival Delayed	This unit was due to arrive from the Great Central Railway soon after 51616 but due to COVID-19, this was delayed.
327974 liveried as 97649	Ruston Class 165DS		Diesel Shunter 0-4-0	BR Blue	Retired	The wheelsets are in poor condition so is out of service, is on the to do list but in the long term.
395305	Ruston Class 165DS		Diesel Shunter 0-4-0	Green	Vacuum brake has been fitted, but still out of service.	
2000	Class B3 Peckett		Industrial 0-6-0 Locomotive	Industrial Green	In use,	on loan to the railway
	Kingswood		Diesel Shunter 0-4-0	Light Green	In use	
	BR Class 10				In Use	
2100 of 1949, 'William Murdoch'	Class R4 Peckett		Industrial 0-4-0 Locomotive	Industrial Blue	Under deep overhaul	Property of Portsmouth Museums, was on long-term loan to GWR Preservation Group Ltd, became full property of Portsmouth Museums in 2021. Repairs to boiler tubes are currently on hold due to other projects.
Bluebell	BR 20-ton standard brake van		Brake van	BR Brown	currently under restoration	
Daisy	BR 20-ton standard brake van		Brake Van	BR Brown with yellow middle section	in storage awaiting restoration	
94148	BR General Utility Van		GUV Coach NKA	Rail Express Systems Red	In use	Shop
E43147	BR Mark 1		British Railways Mark 1 Suburban Brake	Carmine and Cream	In use	Going into BR Maroon
188815	Flatwagon			Black	Under restoration	Gifted by the Sir Robert McAlpine Construction Company, used to build Wembley Stadium.
	Flatwagon			Black	In use	Gifted by the Sir Robert McAlpine Construction Company
68016	Type 17A Wickham Trolley		2w-2PMR Petrol Mechanical Railcar	BR Marron	Restoration nearly completed	On long-term loan from the Rail Trolley Trust at the Chasewater Railway.

=== Steam working ===
On 25–26 July 2010, steam returned to Helston for the first time since 1962, during celebration of the completion of the latest station platform on the line and the newest since Truthall Platform in 1905.

The engine Judy one of two similar preserved Bagnall 0-4-0STs, lent a working presence, courtesy of Bodmin and Wenford Railway.

The Mayor of Helston officiated at the grand opening of Trevarno Station, on 26 July 2010, with Judy in attendance. Although Judy was in steam and operating on the railway, she was unable to carry passengers, as the company were not authorised to operate passenger trains at the time.

In March 2017, William Murdoch, an 0-4-0 Peckett shunting engine, was obtained on long-term loan from Portsmouth museum trust. It ran once down the line under its own steam but was quickly discovered to be in need of maintenance. The boiler has been overhauled with a new 10 year ticket and most maintenance work on the engine is complete. In 2021, it became full property of the Portsmouth Museum Trust. It is awaiting assembly.

For the 2018 and 2019 seasons, the Railway hired in R3 Peckett 'Kilmersdon' from the Somerset & Dorset Railway Trust at Washford. She returned to the S&DRT in March 2021 for overhaul.

Before the 2021 season had started Peckett no.2000, an 0-6-0ST, Arriving on loan to the railway working throughout the 2021 & 2022 seasons, hauling all of the steam hauled passenger trains during this period.

== See also ==
- Helston Folk Museum
