= Praze railway station =

Former railway station in England

Coordinates: 50.171035°N 5.309410°W

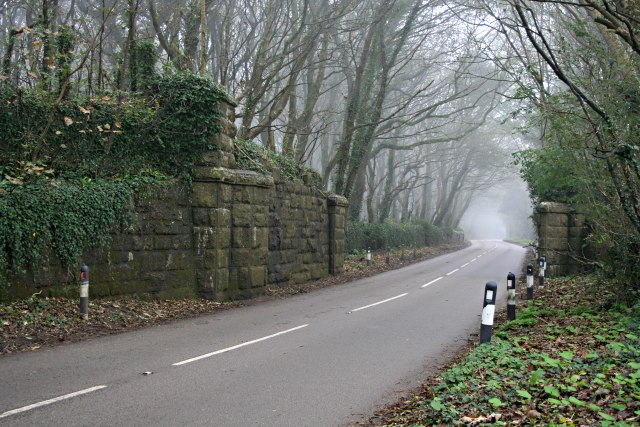
One of two sets of abutments that carried the railway near Praze

Praze railway station was built to the south of the village of Praze-An-Beeble, Cornwall, England, at an elevation of 360 feet (110 m). It was an intermediate station on the single-track Helston Railway between Gwinear Road and Nancegollan, and was opened on 9 May 1887 when the line opened. The line closed on 5 October 1964 and since closure a house has been built on the site of the station and the girders and bridge deck that took the railway over the road have been removed, leaving just the brick abutments. The only other sign of a station near the village is the road name "Station Hill".

Preceding station	Historical railways	Following station
Gwinear Road	Great Western Railway; Helston Railway	Nancegollan

== Description ==
The platform was on the south-west side of the line and was of stone construction with brick edging. Part way along the platform was a station building constructed of small stones with granite quoins, a slate roof and two brick chimneys. At the up end of the station building was a wooden building that housed the ground frame, this being of wooden construction with a slate roof and glazed front giving it the appearance of a tiny signal box. Beyond this at the end of the platform was a circular metal water tank.

Opposite the platform was a single loop which was later truncated at the down end with a buffer stop. This loop (later siding) had coal bins and vehicular access for loading and unloading although there were no goods facilities provided.
