= Truthall Halt railway station =

Former railway station in England

Truthall Halt
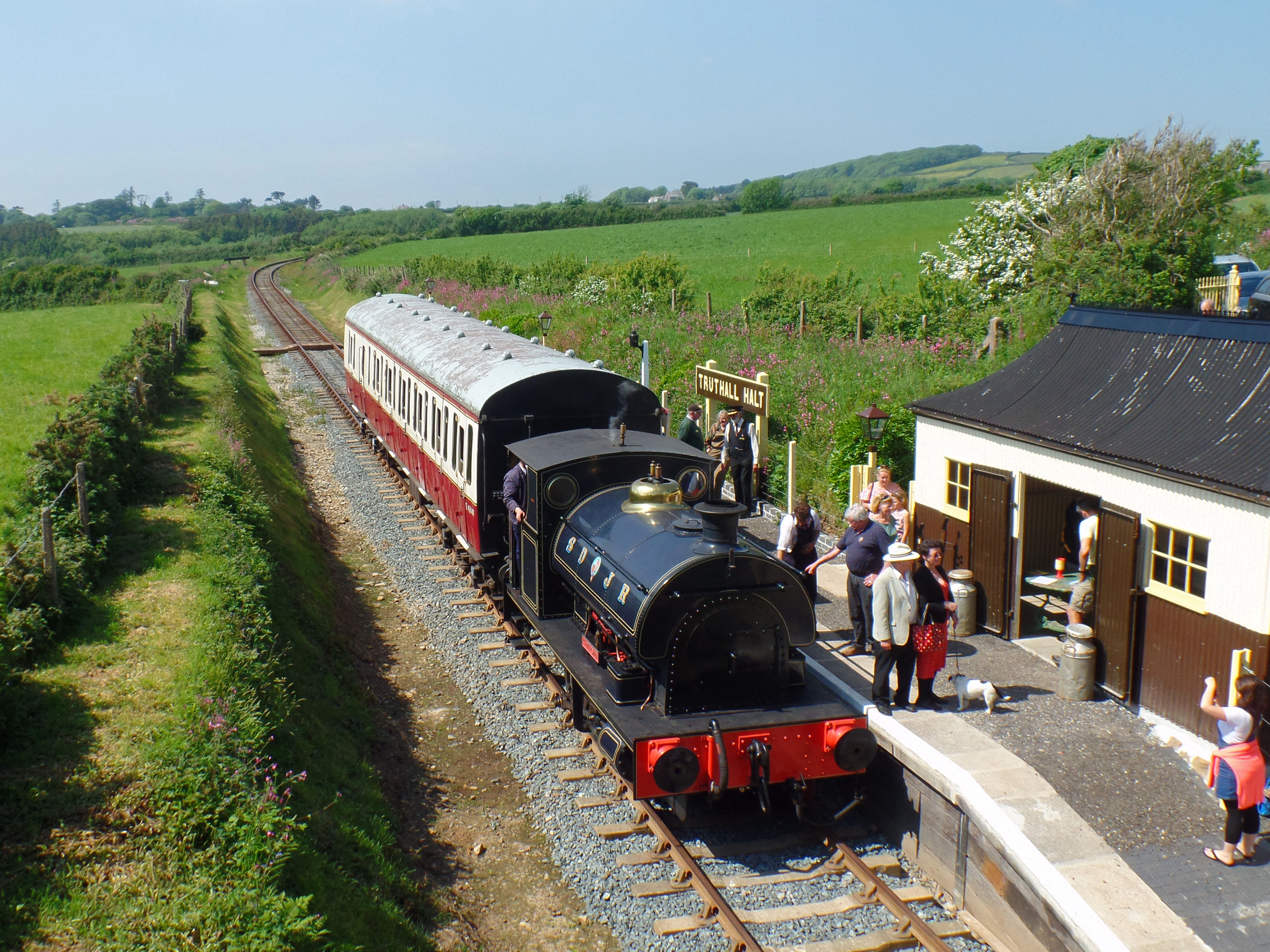
- The restored station taken from the road bridge to the South in May 2018.

General information
- Location: England
- Coordinates: 50.1209°N 5.2837°W
- System: Station on Helston Railway
- Platforms: 1

Key dates
- 3 July 1905: Opened
- July 1906: Renamed Truthall Platform
- 5 November 1962: Closed
- 16 March 2017: Reopened
Location

Truthall Halt on the Helston branch was opened on 3 July 1905. The small station, which was located just above the 300 feet (91 m) contour, served the villages of Trannack and Gwavas, and also Truthall Manor. It was the first stop about one and three-quarters miles (2.8 km) north of Helston.

Truthall originally had a short platform with an iconic "Pagoda Platform Shelter”.

== Description ==
Truthall Halt was constructed adjacent to a road overbridge and had pedestrian access down a short flight of shallow steps from the road; there was no vehicular access. It had a single platform 84 feet (26 m) long on the down side of the line, though it was shortened later to about 50 feet (15 m). The platform had stone edging and a cinder surface and infill held back by wooden slats retained by wooden posts and lengths of Barlow Rail, disposed of by the West Cornwall Railway and Great Western Railway.

== History ==
Truthall Halt was opened by the Great Western Railway in July 1905 after the line had been opened for a number of years.

Truthall Halt opened as such but changed its name to Truthall Platform in July 1906 and closed with this name on 5 November 1962. The station has held three different names – Truthall Platform, Truthall Halt and Truthall Bridge Halt – although the last one was only referred to in ticketing.

In 2016–17 the platform was rebuilt and re-opened in March 2017. On 9 February 2019, Truthall Halt and the Helston Railway won the Heritage Railway Association Annual Award for Small Groups for the work in restoring Truthall.

== Restoration ==
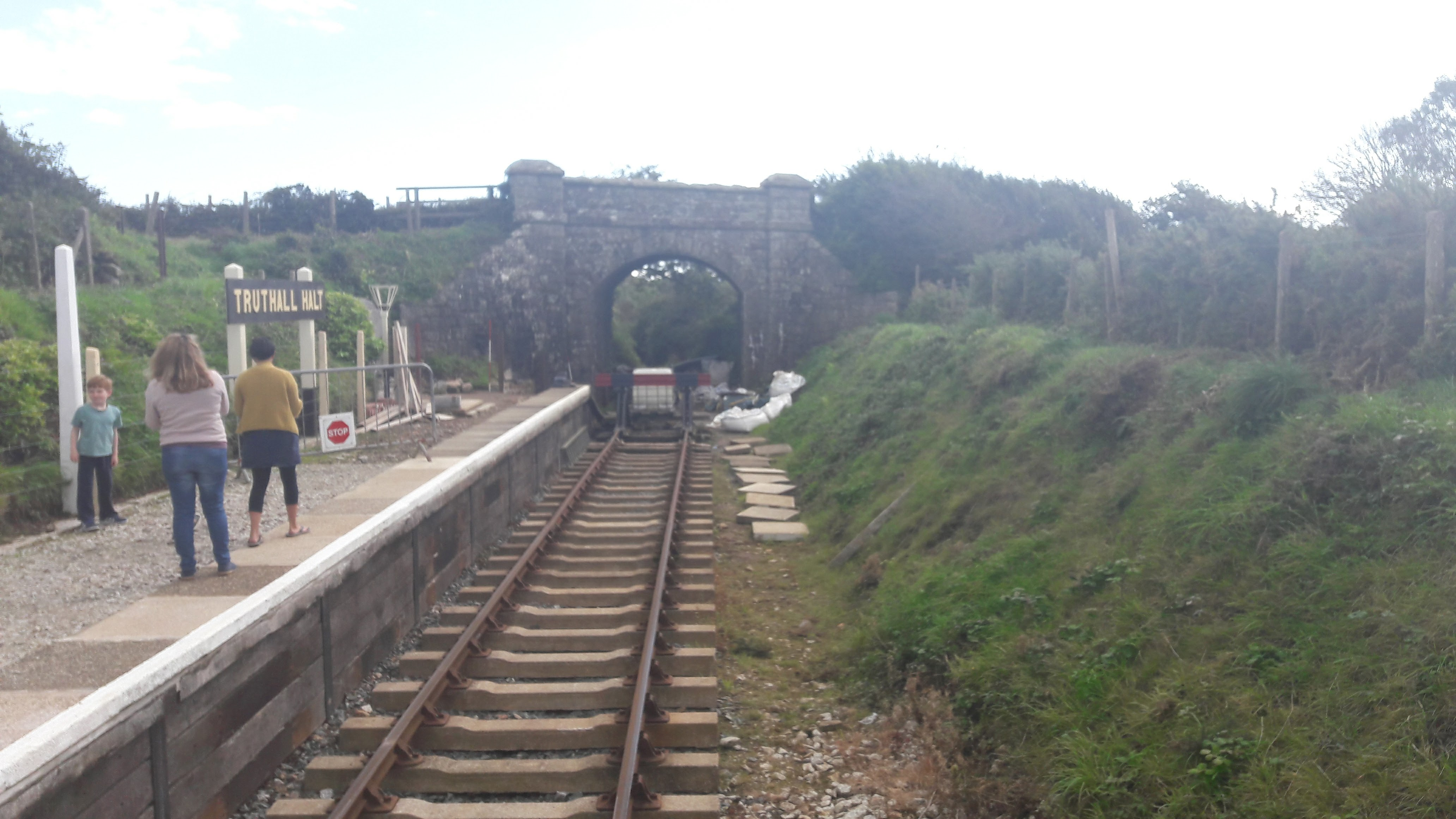
Truthall Halt in 2017

The platform has been rebuilt by the Helston Railway as their third station along the line. The halt has been restored in its original two coach length with as many original features as possible including a replica of the GWR Pagoda shelter has been built new from photos and original drawings of the shelter.

The station was formally opened on the 5th April 2018 by HRH the Duke of Gloucester.

The restored station won the Cornish Buildings Group award in 2019 for its "considerable research and constructional ingenuity".

Preceding station	Historical railways	Following station
Nancegollan	Great Western Railway; Helston Railway	Helston
