= Wadebridge railway station =

Disused railway station in Cornwall, England

Wadebridge Ponswad
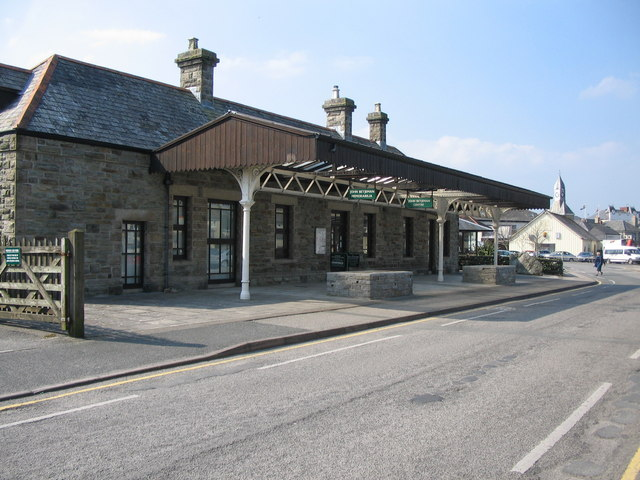

General information
- Location: Wadebridge, Cornwall, England
- Coordinates: 50.5151°N 4.8344°W
- Platforms: 3

Other information
- Status: Disused

History
- Pre-grouping: Bodmin and Wadebridge Railway, London and South Western Railway
- Post-grouping: Southern Railway, Western Region of British Railways

Key dates
- 4 July 1834: Opened
- 3 September 1888: Rebuilt
- 30 January 1967: Closed to passengers
- 2 September 1978: Closed to freight
Location

Wadebridge railway station (Cornish: Ponswad) served the town of Wadebridge, in Cornwall, England. It was a stop on the Bodmin and Wadebridge Railway.

It opened in 1834 to transport goods between Wadebridge, the limit of navigation on the River Camel, and inland farming and mining areas. The railway was built to take stone from local quarries such as the De Lank Quarries on Bodmin Moor towards the coast, as well as sand dredged from the River Camel and landed at the quays in Wadebridge inland to be used to improve the heavy local soil. The station is situated just upstream of Wadebridge bridge and almost next to the tidal River Camel.

== History ==
=== Original station ===
The original station in Wadebridge was built on a triangle of land bounded by the River Camel, the Polmorla brook, and what is now The Platt. The single platform and engine shed were on the town side of the line, which continued across Molesworth Street to serve the quays immediately downstream of Wadebridge bridge.

Towards Bodmin, the railway ran along the valley floor, leaving the town environs past Guineaport quay, and then hugging the south side of the Camel valley. This station remained in use until 3 September 1888, when the railway closed so that the track, still laid on the granite blocks used in its construction in 1834, could be relaid using the more usual transverse wooden sleepers.

=== Rebuilding and extension ===
On 1 June 1895, the Bodmin and Wadebridge was linked to the London and South Western Railway's North Cornwall Line, which stretched away through the sparsely populated countryside of North Cornwall to Launceston and Okehampton, diverging from the Bodmin line at Wadebridge Junction, at a point 48 chains east of Wadebridge station, near to the confluence of the Rivers Allen and Camel.

At this time, a new station was built slightly nearer to Bodmin, separated from the central portion of Wadebridge town by the Polmorla brook. The single long platform contained the buildings that still exist: a one-storey station building, incorporating a ticket office and waiting rooms, and a tall goods shed which was near enough to the rather squat station building to dominate it in height. In addition, a signal box was built immediately beyond the end of the platform.

In 1899, construction works commenced on the westward extension of the North Cornwall Line towards Padstow, via the salt marsh and the tidal Camel estuary, to the port of Padstow. In order to accommodate the extra traffic anticipated, an island platform 105 yards (96 m) in length was added between the existing platform and the engine shed, both sides of which were in use as platforms 2 and 3; the original platform being platform 1. Access to this new island platform was gained by a wooden lattice footbridge situated towards the down (Padstow) end of the station. A waiting room and a generous canopy were also installed. The works also involved considerable rearrangement of the track layout and signalling, with the original goods connection over Molesworth Street, using the existing level crossing, to the quay being upgraded to a passenger line. The original signal box was closed and replaced by two new signal boxes, Wadebridge East and Wadebridge West. The first passenger train to use this stretch ran on 27 March 1899.

=== Later alterations ===
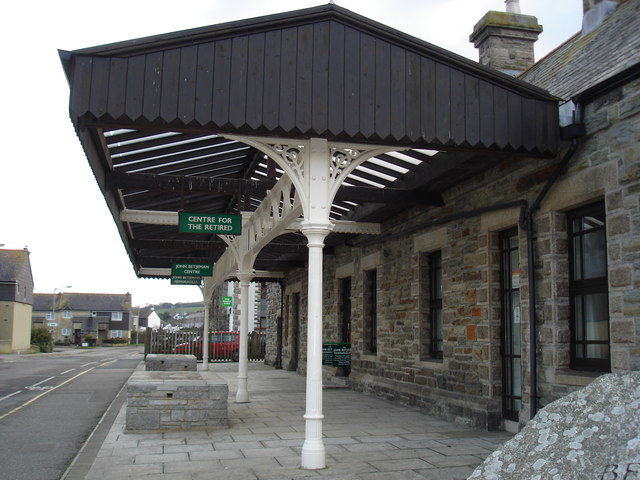
Restored platform canopy

In 1907, major alterations were made to Wadebridge station. The line towards Bodmin, up to this date single track, was doubled as far as the divergence of the North Cornwall Line from the Bodmin line, and soon after this the points at Wadebridge Junction were removed and the signal box at that location closed. This meant that the two lines going in the Up direction from Wadebridge (towards Launceston and Bodmin respectively) were actually two parallel single-track lines once the points at Wadebridge East Signal Box had been passed. This was sited adjacent to the farm crossing that allowed access to Jubilee meadow, the field which separated the station from the river. At this time further lines were installed to the engine shed and the sand dock were also installed, the latter allowing access to the sand dock without having to use the lifting bridge which had been a hindrance as it was not strong enough to take the weight of a locomotive.

From this date, changes were few. The wooden LSWR pattern footbridge was replaced by a utilitarian pre-cast concrete model of Southern Railway design during the 1920s and the signalling was replaced in late 1931. Platform 1 was extended by some yards in the direction of Bodmin, a noticeable feature as the extension was higher than the original platform and of brick construction rather than local stone. An annex to the goods shed was built in 1941 out of concrete blocks, taking most of the space between the original goods shed and the station building, although the end of the extension was latterly open after a shunting accident demolished a large portion of the end wall. The date of installation of the turntable is unclear, but by 1930 a 50-foot (15 m) turntable was in existence behind the engine shed; a larger turntable was never installed and engines such as the West Country pacifics had to run down to Padstow where a 70-foot (21 m) turntable was provided.

=== Stationmasters ===
- Hayes Kyd 1861 - 1888
- Alexander Campbell from 1888 (formerly station master at Campden)
- Mr. King until 1900 (later station master at Exeter St Davids)
- W.H. Cleall 1900-1905
- Harry Hother 1905-1909 (formerly station master at Seaton, later station master at Axminster)
- Frederick Reuben Heath 1909-1912 (formerly station master at Axminster, later station master at Barnstaple Junction)
- William John Brown 1916-1926 (formerly station master at Chard)
- Frederick Henry Brazier 1926-ca.1932
- F. Cawsey 1933-1936 (later station master at Barnstaple Junction)
- Frederick Clapp 1936-ca. 1944 (formerly station master at Crediton)
- A.E. Balment from 1946 (formerly station master at Whimple)
- Jeremy M. Taylor ca. 1958-1965.

=== Closure ===
The North Cornwall line closed on 1 October 1966 and Wadebridge station, along with the line from Bodmin, closed to passengers on 30 January 1967. The line to Padstow remained for 0.25 miles (0.4 km) beyond the level crossing to allow access to the lines serving the quays on the river; the remainder of the track to Padstow, and the whole of the line to Okehampton, were lifted. Even the quay lines did not last long, with the ancillary sidings being removed in November 1971 and the quay lines themselves in April 1973. The line was then terminated short of the level crossing at Molesworth Street. In keeping with its reduced status, the buildings on the island platform and the engine shed were demolished in the years after closure, with the remains of the concrete footbridge being dumped unceremoniously in the turntable pit.

Wadebridge continued in use for freight until 1978, particularly sending out powdered slate from Delabole quarry for which a vacuum system was installed to load Presflo wagons. The last locomotive-hauled passenger train, a seven-coach special from the Midlands hauled by Class 25 no. 25080, ran on 30 September 1978; a diesel multiple unit shuttle from Bodmin, organised for charity, was the last passenger train of all on 17 December 1978.

The station featured in poet laureate Sir John Betjeman's film of his verse autobiography Summoned by Bells. He is seen standing on the derelict platform reciting his eponymous poem:

On Wadebridge Platform what a breath of sea scented the Camel valley!
Cornish air,
Soft Cornish rain,
And silence after steam...

=== Services ===
Preceding station	Disused railways	Following station
St Kew Highway	British Rail Western Region; North Cornwall line	Padstow
Terminus	London and South Western Railway; Bodmin and Wadebridge line	Grogley Halt

== The site today ==
The main station building, made of granite with slate tiles, still stands as the Betjeman Centre. Similarly, the original part of the goods shed is in use as the Betty Fisher Centre, a youth club. The rest of the site, including the engine shed, has been redeveloped as the Southern Way housing estate.

A road, Southern Way, runs along the old trackbed where the main platform was. The sand dock is now a Co-op store, although the road access still uses the railway bridge over the Polmorla Brook, with the original railings still extant. Standing on this bridge looking towards the River Camel, the location of the railway siding giving access to the old sand dock can still be discerned although the bridge itself is long gone.

On the Padstow side of the bridge, a road occupies the space previously occupied by both the railway trackbed and an adjacent lane, but the lines which curved away from this towards the quays along the river cannot now be discerned. Once the limit of development on the riverside is reached the old trackbed, in the form of the Camel Trail, becomes visible again.

== Future plans ==
Efforts are being made to return trains to the Bodmin and Wadebridge railway line by extending the Bodmin and Wenford Railway from the current end of the running line at Boscarne Junction to a proposed new station at Wadebridge, situated just beyond Guineaport. This would mean diverting the Camel Trail in places to make way for the railway.
