= Delabole railway station =

Former railway station in Cornwall, England

Delabole Delyow Boll
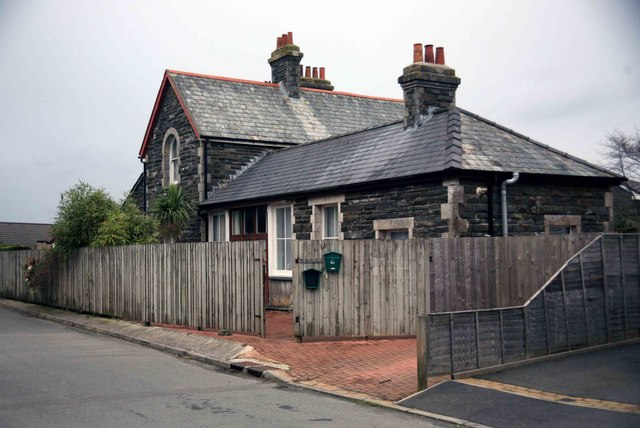
- The former station in 2009

General information
- Location: Delabole, Cornwall; England
- Coordinates: 50.6226°N 4.7268°W
- Grid reference: SX0721983875
- Platforms: 2

Other information
- Status: Disused

History
- Pre-grouping: London and South Western Railway
- Post-grouping: Southern Railway

Key dates
- 18 October 1893: Station opens
- 7 September 1964: Station closed to goods
- 3 October 1966: Station closed to passengers
Location

Delabole railway station (Cornish: Delyow Boll) was a railway station that served a quarry, rural district, and village of Delabole, situated approximately two miles (3 km) west of Camelford in north Cornwall, England, UK. It was located on the North Cornwall Railway and named after Delabole Quarry. There were three hamlets in the vicinity, Pengelly, Meadrose, and Rockhead, while the hamlet of Delabole was south of the quarry.

== History ==
Delabole Slate Quarry lay nearby and therefore the station had a large number of sidings. The station had a passing loop, two platforms and a single siding was provided behind the up platform, where the signal box was sited. The station building was on the down side and a short loading dock with the goods shed on a further siding running behind the platform. A single road through engine shed with a turntable beyond sat between the goods shed and a line running to the quarry.

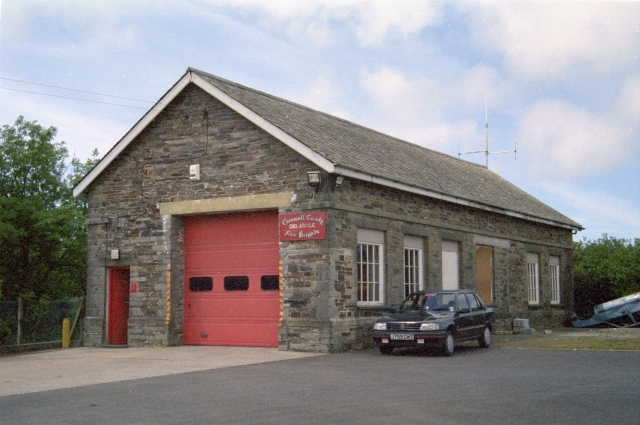
The old goods shed, re-used as Delabole Fire Station

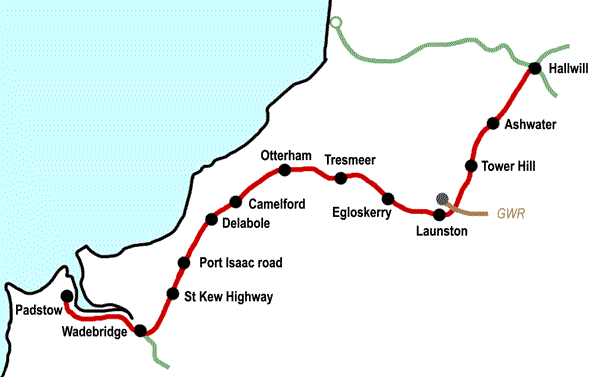
Map of the line

The station was in the village itself and was therefore convenient, also the quarry meant that freight receipts were significant. The loading dock was removed when goods services were withdrawn; the siding on the down side was also removed.

The station was absorbed by the Southern Railway during the Grouping of 1923. The station passed to the Southern Region of British Railways on nationalisation in 1948, and was subsequently closed by the British Railways Board.

The station building is now in use as a private residence, and houses have been built on the site of the up platform.

== Memories ==
One story is told of the guard who left it too late to board the train going to Padstow. Not being able to board the train, the guard outside the train, hanging grimly onto the carriage door, in imminent danger of being crushed on the side of the Railway Bridge as it passed under it. The train was stopped in time and the guard was not injured. During WW2 a plane crashed onto the railway line close to the station and the train coming from Camelford had to be stopped before a collision took place.

Preceding station	Historical railways	Following station
Camelford	Southern Railway; London and South Western Railway	Port Isaac Road
