= Tower Hill railway station =

Tower Hill railway station may refer to:

- Tower Hill (Staten Island Railway station), New York, New York, United States
- Tower Hill railway station (Devon), United Kingdom
- Tower Hill tube station, London, United Kingdom
