= Camel Trail =

Rail trail in Cornwall, England

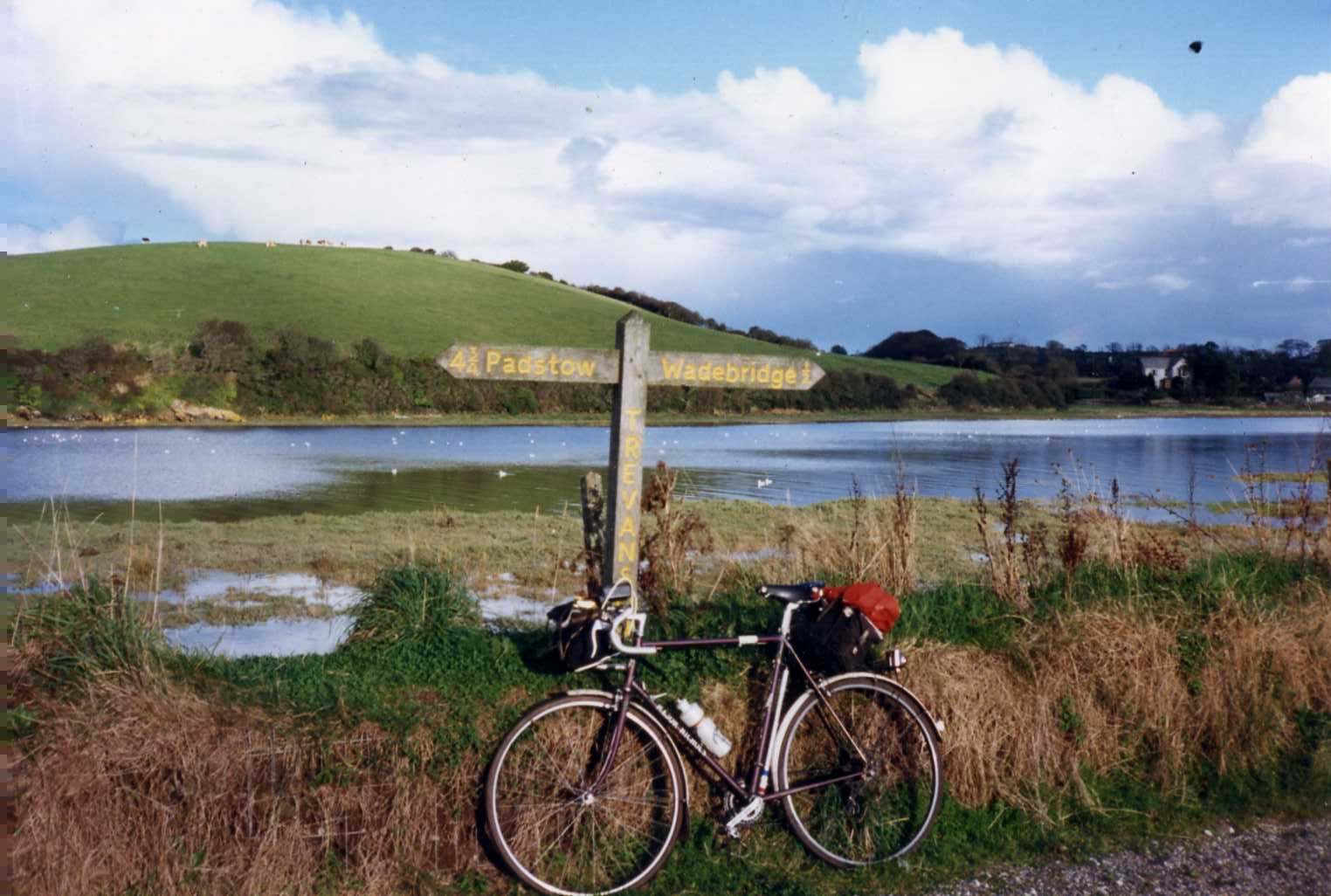
- The trail beside the Camel Estuary, near Trevanson (1987)
- Length: 18.3 miles (29.5 km), as of 2024
- Location: Cornwall, England
- Trailheads: Padstow, (Note: Located at: 50.5377°N 4.9347°W); Wenford Bridge (Note: Located at: 50.5447°N 4.7039°W)
- Use: Walking, running, cycling, horseriding
- Grade: 0.23%

The Camel Trail is a shared-use path in Cornwall, England, available for pedestrians, cyclists, horse riders and wheelchair users. As a rail trail, the route has only a slight incline following the river Camel from Padstow to Wenford Bridge, via Wadebridge and Bodmin, at a total of 18.3 miles (29.5 km) long.

In 2003, 400,000 people were estimated to use the trail each year, generating approximately £3 million per year for the local economy. The trail is managed jointly by Cornwall Council and the Camel Trail Partnership.

== History ==
The trail follows the trackbed of two historic railway lines:

- A section of the North Cornwall Railway between Padstow and Wadebridge
- The Bodmin and Wadebridge Railway (B&WR) between Wadebridge and Wenfordbridge, along with a short branch towards the former Bodmin North station.

=== Railway ===
The Bodmin and Wadebridge Railway was built at a cost of £35,000, following a study commissioned in 1831 by local landowner Sir William Molesworth of Pencarrow. The line was originally used to carry lime-rich sand from the Camel estuary to inland farms for use as fertiliser. In 1862, the railway started shipping china clay which, became its most reliable trade. Additionally, the line would be used to ship slate from inland quarries to ships in Padstow; it would also transport fish landed in Padstow inland, primarily to London and other large cities.

In 1868, the London and South Western Railway (LSWR) purchased the B&WR without parliamentary consent. Although an ultra vires purchase, the acquisition would become legalised in 1886. In the interim, the LSWR nonetheless supported the B&WR and sought to connect the isolated railway to its own network via the LSWR-backed North Cornwall Railway. The now LSWR-owned NCR line from Halwill Junction reached Wadebridge in June 1895, and then Padstow in March 1899.

In 1923, as a part of the railways Grouping Act the lines were taken over by Southern Railway, and then again by British Railways (BR) during nationalisation. Under BR, the lines repeatedly changed hands between its Southern and Western Regions, causing management issues. As quarrying and fishing diminished, and with greater use of lorries, the railway lost much of its freight traffic; despite this, the line's passenger services continued to be used frequently by holidaymakers and students.

As with much of the BR network over the course of the 1960s, services between Padstow and Bodmin's three stations (Bodmin Road, Bodmin General and Bodmin North) were closed under the Beeching Axe; this was an attempt by the UK Government to reduce British Railways' costs and improve its efficiency. As a result, passenger services between Bodmin and Padstow were terminated, with the last passenger train running in 1967. Freight services continued between Bodmin Road and Wadebridge until 1978. The last services on the line to close were the china clay freight services from Wenfordbridge to Bodmin in September 1983.

=== Conversion to a trail ===
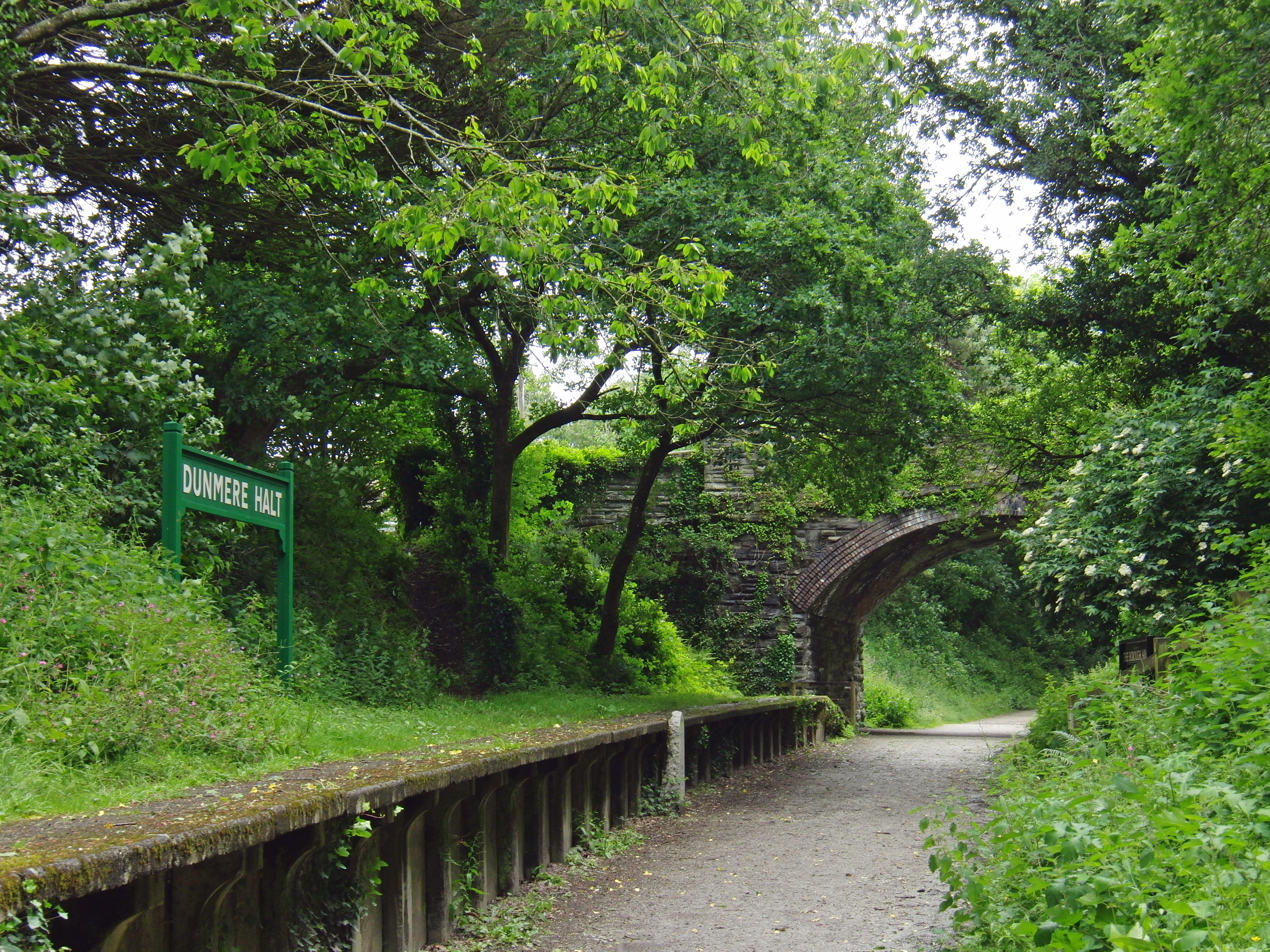
The Camel Trail passing through the disused Dunmere Halt

With the cessation of Padstow–Wadebridge services, Cornwall County Council purchased the trackbed from British Railways and in 1980 converted the bed to a public trail. Following this, the trackbed of the Wadebridge–Boscarne stretch was also acquired by County Council.

In 1983, Nigel Wiggett opened Bridge Bike Hire in Wadebridge, the first bike hire along the trail and first in the West Country. Since then, more bike hire vendors have been established in Wadebridge and these have been joined by others in Padstow, Bodmin and Wendfordbridge.

After the closure of the Wenford's clay freight services, the North Cornwall District Council (NCDC) acquired the Boscarne–Wenfordbridge trackbed for use as a footpath. In 1988, NCDC requested funding to make improvements to the Boscarne–Wenfordbridge stretch so as to integrate it with the rest of the Camel Trail.

In 1991, the Wadebridge and Egloshayl bypasses were constructed, removing much of the traffic that those passing through Wadebridge along the trail would otherwise have to contend with.

In 2002, the Camel Trail Partnership Trust was established to co-ordinate management of the trail between local town and parish councils along the trail; the NCDC; Cornwall County Council; the Chambers of Commerce of Bodmin, Wadebridge and Padstow; the Environment Agency; English Nature; and the Forestry Commission.

In 2006, two further extensions to the trail were completed. The first was from Scarlett's Well car park in Bodmin, following into the town. The second was from Poley's Bridge, near St Breward, to Wenfordbridge through the old clay dries, which was made possible by Imerys donating the land.

In 2009, Cornwall County Council and the NCDC, along with the rest of Cornwall's district councils, were disbanded and replaced by the new unitary authority, Cornwall Council, which inherited the ownership and responsibilities of the Trail that were held by the County Council and the District Council.

== The trail today ==
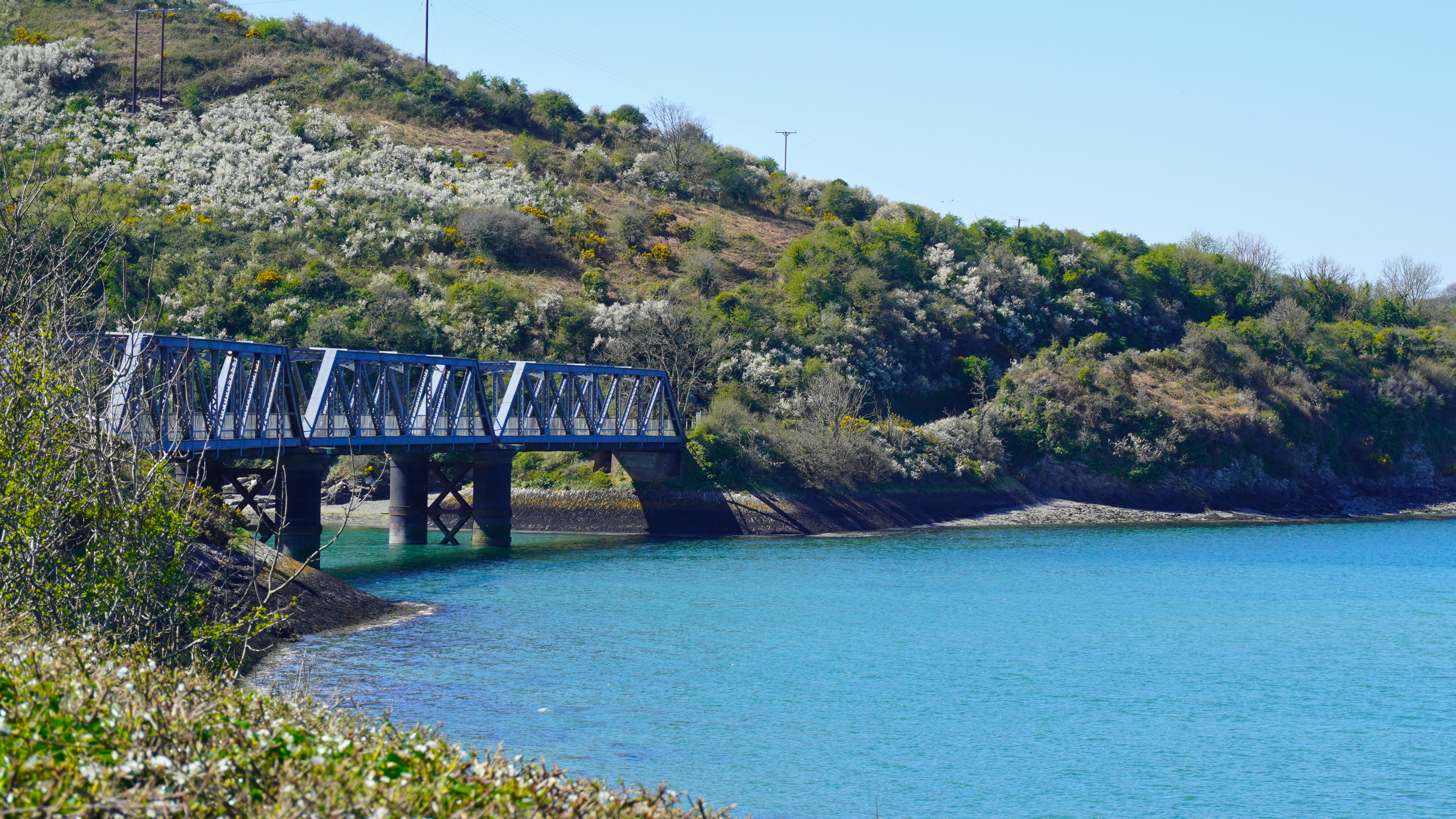
Approaching Padstow. the Camel Trail crosses Petherick Creek on this bridge that formerly carried the North Cornwall Railway

The trail is managed and maintained by Cornwall Council and the Camel Trail Partnership. The bike hire shops operating along the Camel Trail in Padstow, Wadebridge, Bodmin and Wendfordbridge pay an annual licence fee to the council, which is used to help with the trail's maintenance.

As an erstwhile rail trail, the trackbed was built such that trains would have only a moderate incline and smooth turns, making it suitable as a cycle trail. Only a small part of the trail passing through Wadebridge is on roads; it is also infrequently junctioned by rural back roads.

The Camel Trail shares the Padstow trailhead with the Saints' Way trail. The trail also constitutes part of the National Cycle Network, with the Padstow–Dunmere section a part of Route 32 and the Bodmin–Wenfordbridge section overlapping with Route 3. The trail also constitutes part of The Cornish Way.

Between Wadebridge and Padstow, the trail passes through the Camel Estuary section of the Cornwall National Landscape. In this section, about halfway along the track, the path passes through the spoil heaps of Camel Quarry. The quarry was in use during the 16th century mining slate and made use of an Oatey & Sons steam engine at the time

== Further proposals ==
The newly created Bodmin and Wenford Railway sought to reopen the Wenford branch to allow for china clay to again be moved from Wenfordbridge by rail. A separate company, Bodmin and Wenford Rail Freight Limited, was set up in 1992 but the line was not reopened. There were objections from cyclists as, at this point, the track bed had been used for the Camel Trail and the china clay drier closed in 2002.

Following the closure, attempts at potential expansion has since changed to the route from Boscarne Junction towards Wadebridge, although this route also follows the Camel Trail. The Bodmin and Wenford Rail Freight Company was renamed the Bodmin and Wadebridge Railway Company in 2004 to facilitate this scheme. Initially referred to as The Wadebridge Trailway it became the RailTrail project in 2008. It was supported by the North Cornwall District Council, but only by a single casting vote; there were objections from cyclists, environmentalists and some residents of Wadebridge. A bid for government funding was made in 2020.

Scott Mann, Conservative MP for North Cornwall, stated his support for linking up the Camel Trail with the Tarka Trail in September 2020, arguing that it would increase the economic benefits brought in by the Camel Trail.

Sustrans published a study on 18 December 2020 regarding a potential extension of the Camel Trail from Wenfordbridge to Camelford and on to Delabole. The study also looked at another proposal regarded branch of the Camel Trail from Wadebridge to Launceston, via the North Cornwall Railway trackbed, and on to Lydford, via the Launceston and South Devon Railway trackbed. The study split plans into trail segments, typically between disused stations or towns, and assessed both the feasibility and value of each segment.

Sustrans assessment of deliverability against value of proposed trail segments
Deliverability of each segment	Value of each segment	
Deliverability of each segment	Lower impact	Higher impact
Less challenging deliverability	St Kew Highway to Port Isaac Road, Slaughter Bridge to Otterham, Otterham to Tresmeer	Port Isaac Road to Delabole, Delabole to Slaughter Bridge, Egloskerry to Launceston, Marystow to Lydford, Delabole to Camelford link
More challenging deliverability	Tresmeer to Egloskerry, Lifton to Marystow	Wadebridge to St Kew Highway, Launceston to Lifton, Wenfordbridge to Camelford extension

In 2025, Ben Maguire, the Liberal Democrat MP for North Cornwall, stated support for extending the Camel Trail to Camelford. In response to a letter to the Department for Transport calling for it to support the project, he met with Simon Lightwood, the Under-Secretary of State for Local Transport, to discuss the proposal. Funding for a feasibility study for the Camelford extension was secured in May 2025.

== See also ==
- Disused railway stations (Bodmin to Wadebridge line)
- Disused railway stations (North Cornwall line)
- Rail Trail
- List of rail trails
- Tarka Trail
