= Trevanson =

Hamlet in Cornwall, England

Coordinates: 50°31′12″N 4°51′11″W

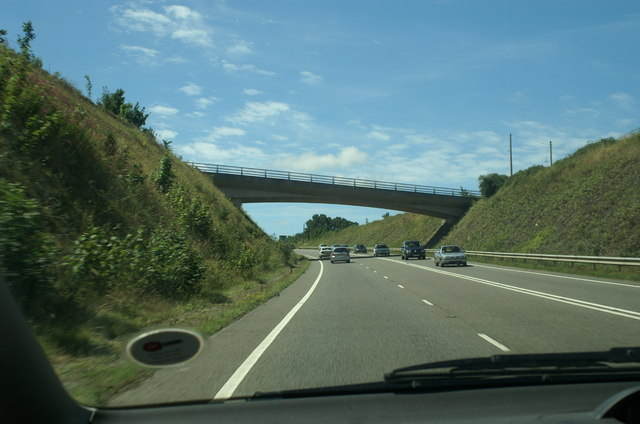
The A39 main road near Trevanson

Trevanson (Cornish: Trevansyn) is a small hamlet in north Cornwall in England. It is on the northern fringe of Wadebridge in the civil parish of St Breock. The A39 bypass effectively separates Trevanson from the rest of Wadebridge and the hamlet is connected to the town by a bridge.

The hamlet has about 20 homes. Footpaths lead from Trevanson to the nearby village of Edmonton and also across country to Tregunna and the Camel Trail, the foot and cycle path linking Padstow, Wadebridge and Bodmin.
