= Pengelly =

Hamlet in north Cornwall, England

Coordinates: 50.62029°N 4.73000°W

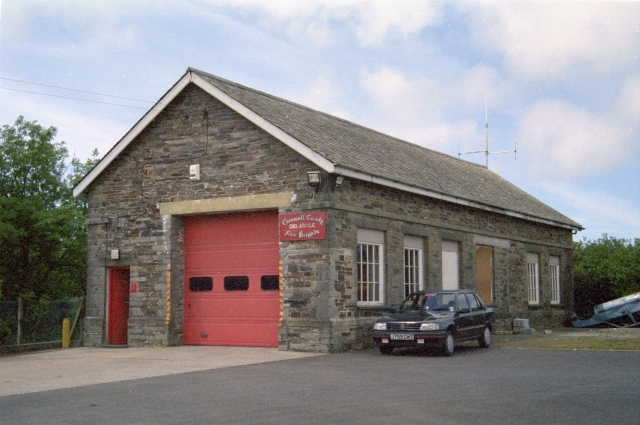
- Delabole Fire Station

- Location within Cornwall
- Civil parish: Delabole
- Unitary authority: Cornwall
- Ceremonial county: Cornwall
- Region: South West
- Country: England
- Sovereign state: United Kingdom
- Police: Devon and Cornwall
- Fire: Cornwall
- Ambulance: South Western

Pengelly (Cornish: Penngelli) is a hamlet in north Cornwall, England, part of the village and civil parish of Delabole which was until April 2021 in the parish of St Teath.

Once Pengelly was a settlement separate from the neighbouring hamlets of Medrose and Rockhead, but the three were merged with the introduction of the railway and the new village adopted the name Delabole.

There are also places called Pengelly in the parishes of Breage, Crowan and St Ewe; the meaning of Pengelly is "end/top of a grove".
