= Launceston railway station =

Former railway station in Launceston, Cornwall, England

Coordinates: 50.640°N 4.365°W

Launceston railway station (Cornish: Lannstevan) was situated in Launceston, Cornwall, England, United Kingdom. It was served by both the Great Western Railway (GWR) and London and South Western Railway (LSWR).

There were actually two stations adjacent to each other, the northern station serving the line to Plymouth, which was built by the Launceston and South Devon Railway (later GWR), and the southern station being on the North Cornwall Railway (for the LSWR) which was operated by the London and South Western Railway. The two stations unusually shared a "back to back" signal box from 1916, despite being operated by different railway companies. A connection between the two railways was provided in 1943. The GWR station closed to passengers in 1952, all trains then using the LSWR station.

The Launceston Steam Railway now operates nearby.

== History ==
The station was opened on 1 June 1865 by the Launceston and South Devon Railway, a 7 ft (2,134 mm) broad gauge line that connected with the South Devon and Tavistock Railway to offer a service to Plymouth Millbay railway station where connections could be made onto trains to London Paddington station. This line eventually became a part of the GWR. It was proposed in 1865 to extend the line to meet the Bude Canal, but the scheme failed to raise its capital.

On 21 July 1886 a 4 ft 8 1/2 in (1,435 mm) standard gauge line was opened from Halwill Junction, built by the North Cornwall Railway, which gave a direct route over the LSWR to London Waterloo station.

The two companies kept separate stations for many years but on 22 September 1943 a connection was established between the two lines to give flexibility should the railway lines around Plymouth be damaged by World War II bombing. Other connections were installed at Lydford railway station and at St Budeaux. Trains continued to use their own company's platforms but on 18 June 1951, about three years after nationalisation and the formation of British Railways, the former GWR station became "Launceston North" and the former LSWR station became "Launceston South". These names did not stay in use for long as from 30 June 1952 the passenger trains from Plymouth were routed into the LSWR platforms.

The two companies had, however, used a single signal box from December 1916 when the GWR's box was closed and the LSWR's widened to take two sets of equipment, one facing each line. The former LSWR's locomotive facilities were closed in the 1940s and locomotives then made use of the adjacent GWR facilities.

Trains were withdrawn from the former GWR line on 31 December 1962; however, from 8 September 1964 until 28 February 1966 the line was reopened as far as Lifton railway station for goods traffic. Trains were withdrawn from the former LSWR line on 3 October 1966.

== Description ==
The LSWR route passed over the GWR line east of the station and the 1943 connection was situated between this lattice girder bridge and the station.

The northernmost platform one was that used, until 1952, by the GWR trains to and from Plymouth. As well as the track alongside the platform, there were two sidings and the southern one was alongside a loading platform. South of this was the platform for LSWR trains towards London, and then that for LSWR trains towards Padstow. It was on this latter platform that the LSWR's offices were situated.

There were goods sheds for both lines, that for the GWR north of their platform; that for the LSWR south of theirs. Engine sheds for both lines were situated at the east end of the station between the two lines.

Preceding station	Disused railways	Following station
Lifton	Great Western Railway; Launceston and South Devon Railway	Terminus
Tower Hill	London and South Western Railway; North Cornwall Railway	Egloskerry

== Launceston Steam Railway ==
Today, the site of both original stations is covered by an industrial estate. The stone steps that used to lead up to the metal overbridge are still extant but little else. A station for the Launceston Steam Railway has been built in a cutting slightly to the west of the old station site, using the canopy formerly at Tavistock North railway station. The railway started operation in 1983.

Preceding station	Heritage railways	Following station
Terminus	Launceston Steam Railway	Hunts Crossing
