= Padstow railway station (England) =

Former railway station in Cornwall, England

Padstow Lannwedhenek
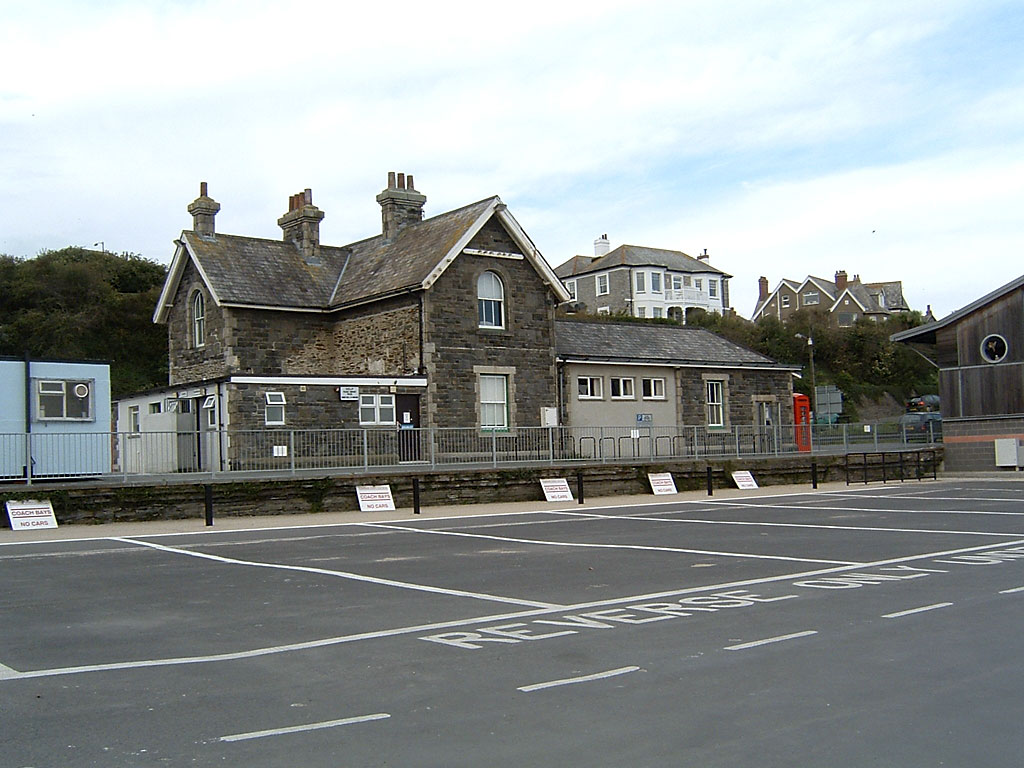

General information
- Location: Padstow, Cornwall; England
- Coordinates: 50.538738°N 4.936037°W
- Platforms: 1

Other information
- Status: Disused

History
- Pre-grouping: London and South Western Railway
- Post-grouping: Southern Railway; Western Region of British Railways

Key dates
- 27 March 1899: Opened
- 7 September 1964: Closed to freight
- 30 January 1967: Closed to passengers
Location

Padstow railway station (Cornish: Lannwedhenek) was the western terminus of the North Cornwall Railway. It was opened in 1899 by the London and South Western Railway (LSWR) to serve the port of Padstow. It closed in 1967 having been proposed for closure in the Beeching Report.

== History ==
Although the LSWR obtained an act of Parliament giving authorisation to construct a line from Halwill & Beaworthy to Padstow in 1882 and opened the line as far as Wadebridge in 1894, it was to be a further five years before the line reached Padstow. The delay came about because of discussions within the LSWR in 1894 as to whether the line should in fact terminate at Truro rather than Padstow. Around the same time, the time period specified by Parliament within which the North Cornwall Line was to be constructed lapsed and it became necessary to apply for fresh authorisation. Under pressure from by local residents, the LSWR obtained new approval in the form of the North Cornwall Railway Act 1896 (59 & 60 Vict. c. clvi) which authorised the extension west over the main road in Wadebridge where a level crossing was to be installed. The line finally arrived in Padstow on 23 March 1899 and the station opened to traffic four days later. The line's opening was celebrated by crowds of local residents who gathered at the station to greet the first train. A brass band was also on hand and played "See The Conquering Hero Comes".

Upon its opening the station consisted of a single platform 100 yards (91 m) in length, a run-around loop, a siding leading down to a fish shed and platform by the harbour where fish consignments were loaded, and a small goods shed on the Down side with canopies over the loading points on each side. The station incorporated the stationmaster's residence and was constructed of local stone. A platform canopy decorated with saw-tooth valancing was also added. Finally, a stone 18-lever signal box was situated near the platform. The first changes occurred in 1900 when a turntable was installed. Around 1910 a carriage siding was added to next to the run-round loop, followed by the construction of the South Jetty served by two long sidings.

The station's heyday was around the time of the railway grouping when it saw substantial passenger traffic in the form of holidaymakers and daytrippers to the coast, with many guests staying at the nearby Metropole Hotel. Outward-bound fish was the main freight traffic, which often reached 1,000 wagonloads during a Spring season. The station was served by the famous Atlantic Coast Express, a direct service from London Waterloo. The Southern Railway took over responsibility of the North Cornwall Line and stations and decided, given the levels of traffic at Padstow, to rebuild the fish platform in the early 1930s. Further modifications came after the Second World War when the turntable was resited and enlarged to accommodate the Bulleid Pacifics.

=== Stationmasters ===
In August 1940, the station master was charged with displaying lights at 1.00am on 31 July during the blackout. The light was caused by burning embers from a locomotive. He was found guilty and fined £5 (equivalent to £345 in 2023).

- J. Buscomb 1899 - 1902 (afterwards station master at Topsham)
- H. Greetham 1902 - 1907 (afterwards station master at Fremington)
- Fred G.R. Heather 1907 - 1911 (formerly station master at Barnstaple, afterwards station master at Feltham)
- F.S. Stretch 1911 - 1919 (formerly station master at Eggesford, afterwards station master at Okehampton)
- Edwin Charles Watkins 1919 - 1927 (formerly station master at Okehampton)
- C.A. Portass 1927 - 1933 (formerly station master at Camelford)
- C. Clarke 1933 - 1935 (afterwards station master at Whimple)
- Francis John Penwarden ca. 1939 ca. 1940

== Decline ==
Following nationalisation in 1948, Padstow station became part of the Southern Region of British Railways. Rationalisation meant that the competing lines of the Western Region and Southern Region in Devon and Cornwall could not survive indefinitely. Declining fish traffic in the 1950s saw the severing of the siding serving the fish station in 1959 and the removal of the canopy on the rail side of the goods shed. The cutbacks were deliberately accelerated once the station was transferred to the Western Region of British Railways in January 1963.

The Beeching Report proposed the closure of Padstow station and the lines serving it. Goods traffic ended in 1964, followed by most of the through passenger trains to London Waterloo (including the Atlantic Coast Express). All through services ceased in September 1966 followed a month later by the closure of the North Cornwall Line; this meant that Padstow could only be reached by changing at Bodmin Road on the Bodmin and Wadebridge Railway.

The line from Padstow to Wadebridge was closed on 30 January 1967 and the track was lifted shortly afterwards.

== The station today ==
The station building is extant and was used as a cycle hire shop but now, it houses the offices of Padstow Town Council. The cycle hire shop has been moved to a new building on the other side of the car park. The trackbed leading into Padstow now forms part of the Camel Trail, a recreational route for walkers, cyclists and horse riders.

In September 2007, the Bodmin and Wenford Railway announced plans to rebuild the North Cornwall Line from Bodmin Road (now known as Bodmin Parkway, the nearest railway station to Padstow now) as far as Wadebridge, following the line of the Camel Trail. The plans have raised speculation as to whether, if realised, they could lead to a further connection to Padstow.

== Services ==
Preceding station	Disused railways	Following station
Terminus	British Rail; Western Region; North Cornwall Line	Wadebridge
Terminus	British Rail; Western Region; Bodmin and Wadebridge Railway	Wadebridge
