= Ashwater railway station =

Former railway station in Devon, England

Coordinates: 50.73364°N 4.27783°W

Ashwater
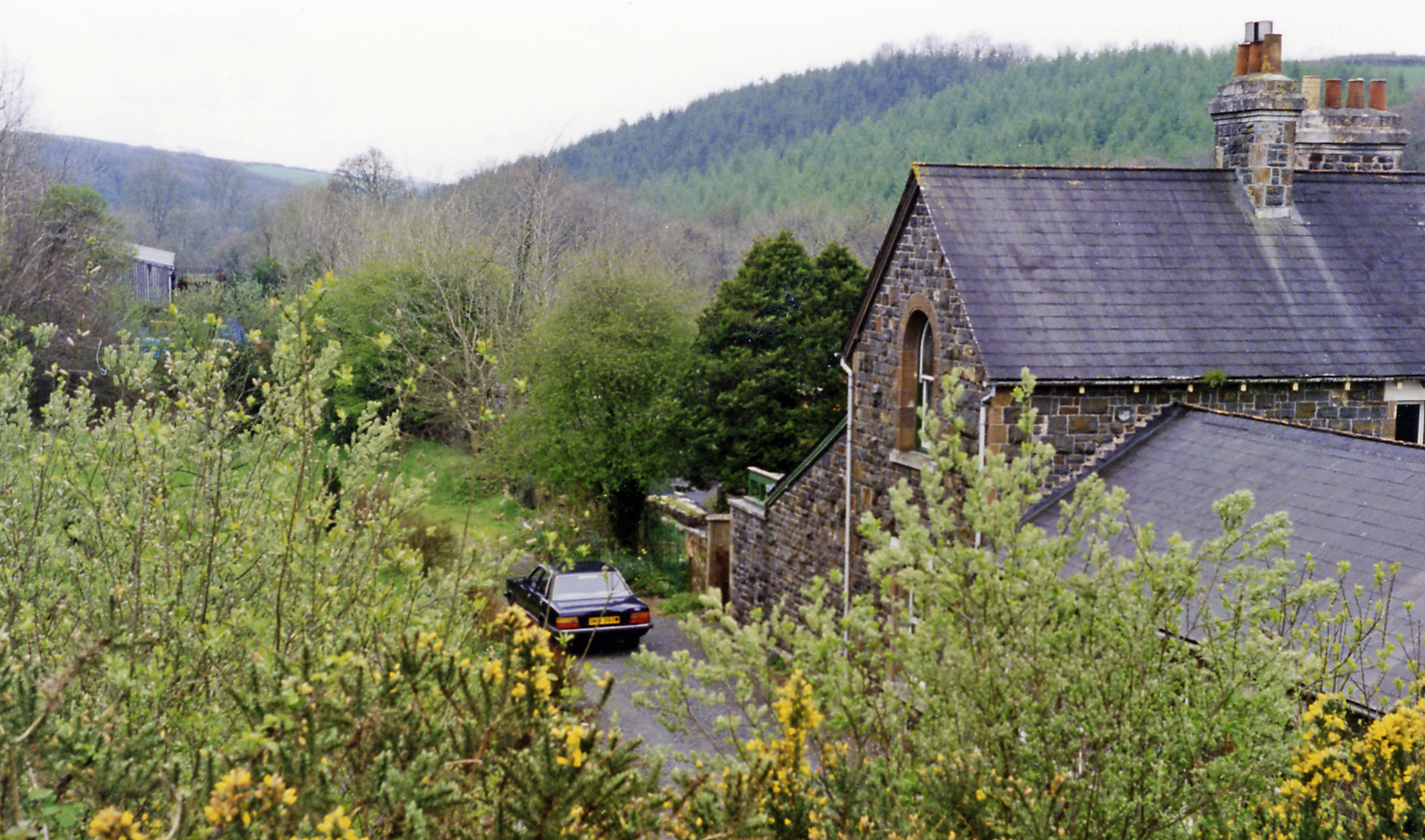
- Station buildings (1995)

General information
- Location: Halwill, Torridge; England
- Platforms: 2

Other information
- Status: Disused

History
- Original company: London and South Western Railway
- Pre-grouping: London and South Western Railway
- Post-grouping: Southern Railway

Key dates
- 21 July 1886: Station opens
- 3 October 1966: Station closed
Location

Ashwater railway station was a railway station that served the hamlets of Ashwater and Ashmill in Devon, England. It was located on the North Cornwall Railway 5 miles (8.0 km) southwest of Halwill, close to the River Carey and approximately 1/2 mile (0.80 km) away from Ashwater.

== History ==
The ceremonial opening of this section of the line by the London and South Western Railway, was Tuesday, 20 July 1886, with public services commencing on the following day.

The station was then absorbed by the Southern Railway during the Grouping of 1923, The station passed to the Southern Region of British Railways on nationalisation in 1948, and was subsequently closed by the British Railways Board.

== Station layout ==
The layout was typical of all the stations on the North Cornwall line, with a substantial stationmaster's house, booking office and waiting room on the upside with both ladies' and gentlemen's toilets. An eleven-lever signal box and small open-fronted waiting shelter stood on the Down platform. The platforms were only long enough for seven-passenger carriages, but from 18 October 1936 the Up loop was extended to accommodate up to twelve coaches.

== The site today ==
The gradual run-down in services during the 1960s saw Ashwater reduced to an unstaffed halt on 7 November 1965, followed by complete closure on 3 October 1966. Today the station is a private residence, but the cast concrete name board is still in situ in peeling S.R. green paint.

Preceding station	Historical railways	Following station
Halwill Junction	Southern Railway; London and South Western Railway	Tower Hill
