= Tower Hill railway station (Devon) =

Former railway station in Devon, England

Tower Hill Station

General information
- Location: Broadwoodwidger, Torridge; England
- Coordinates: 50.6910°N 4.3103°W
- Grid reference: SX369904
- Platforms: 2

Other information
- Status: Disused

History
- Original company: London and South Western Railway
- Pre-grouping: London and South Western Railway
- Post-grouping: Southern Railway

Key dates
- 21 July 1886: Station opens
- 3 October 1966: Station closed
Location

Tower Hill railway station was a railway station that served a rural district being named after a local farm, near the River Carey, Devon, England. It was located on the North Cornwall Railway 5 miles (8.0 km) southwest of Halwill

== History ==
The ceremonial opening of this section of the line by the London and South Western Railway, was Tuesday, 20 July 1886, with public services commencing on the following day.

The line arrived at Tower Hill (50.6908°N 4.3103°W), the station name being taken from a nearby farm. Local people had favoured a station at Boldford, 1½ miles nearer to Launceston, whereas St. Giles on the Heath, ½ mile to the west, was the only village in the area chosen, having a population of 258 in 1901.

The station was then absorbed by the Southern Railway during the Grouping of 1923. The Second World War was to bring a reversal of fortunes when in 1943 the loop was restored and extended by a further 150 yards to enable the servicing of U.S. ammunition dumps in the surrounding countryside. At the same time the signal box was moved from the Down platform to a position in front of the booking office on the Up platform.

The station passed to the Southern Region of British Railways on nationalisation in 1948, and was subsequently closed by the British Railways Board.

The station was oil lit throughout its existence, freight services being withdrawn in February 1964. The signal box closed on 7 November 1965, from which date the 12 1/2 miles (20.1 km) from Halwill to Launceston was a single section. The gradual run-down in services during the 1960s saw Tower Hill reduced to an unstaffed halt, followed by complete closure on 3 October 1966.

== Station layout ==
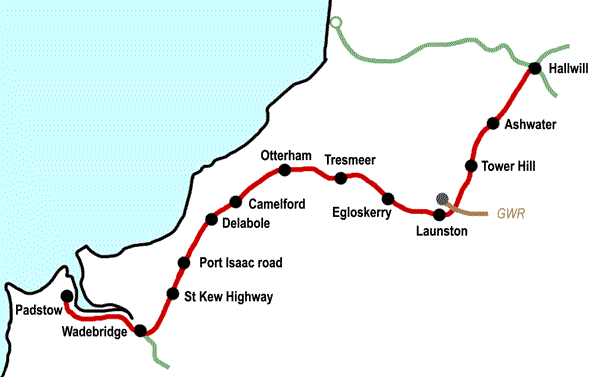
Map of the line.

The original station layout was identical to Ashwater and was typical of all the stations on the North Cornwall line, with a substantial stationmaster's house, booking office and waiting room on the upside with both ladies' and gentlemen's toilets. From 16 June 1920, the down loop was taken out of use and the signalbox closed leaving the section as one of seven miles between Ashwater and Launceston. A ground frame was installed to operate the goods yard points, released by a key on the single line tablet. From 1928 the station came under the control of Launceston and in 1933 the goods siding was shortened.

In March 1943 two new sidings were laid and the headshunt lengthened considerably, the down loop was restored and a new signal box opened in the booking hall, extending out onto the up platform. The points to the goods yard were moved south allowing a 40 wagon train to be held in each loop and in the headshunt. Wartime traffic was mainly ammunition and by August 1944 almost all of this had gone to France. The yard was closed and removed in 1950, however the long crossing loop remained in use, particularly for the 1950s holiday traffic. In February 1964 the goods yard closed and was lifted the following year whilst the down loop was finally out of use, and the signalbox closed on 7 November 1965, creating a single section from Halwill to Launceston.

== The site today ==
The station was completely demolished after closure and only the railway cottages survive. Today there is almost no trace of the station at Tower Hill. A row of LSWR cottages survives close to the site.

Preceding station	Historical railways	Following station
Ashwater	Southern Railway; London and South Western Railway	Launceston
