= North Cornwall Railway =

Disused railway line in Devon and Cornwall, England

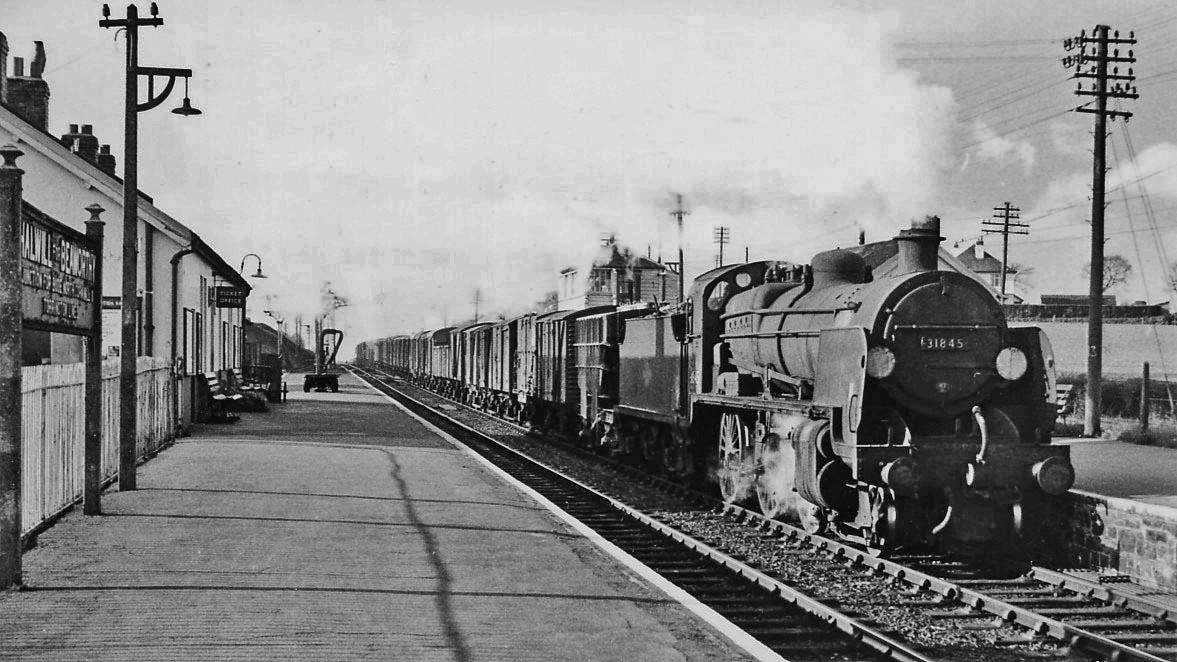
- SR Maunsell N class 2-6-0 No. 31845 train at Halwill Junction

Overview
- Other name: North Cornwall Line
- Status: Ceased operation
- Owner: North Cornwall Railway Company (1882–1922); Southern Railways (1923–1947); British Railways (1948–1967)
- Locale: North Cornwall; West Devon
- Termini: Halwill Junction; Padstow

Service
- Type: Heavy rail
- System: London & South Western Railway (1882–1923); Southern Railways (1923–1947); British Railways (1948–1967)

History
- Opened: 21 July 1886; 140 years ago
- Completed: 27 March 1899; 127 years ago
- Closed: 28 January 1967; 59 years ago

Technical
- Line length: 49.8 mi (80.1 km)
- Number of tracks: Single track with passing loops
- Track gauge: 1,435 mm (4 ft 8 1/2 in) standard gauge
- Operating speed: 55 mph (89 km/h) maximum
Route map
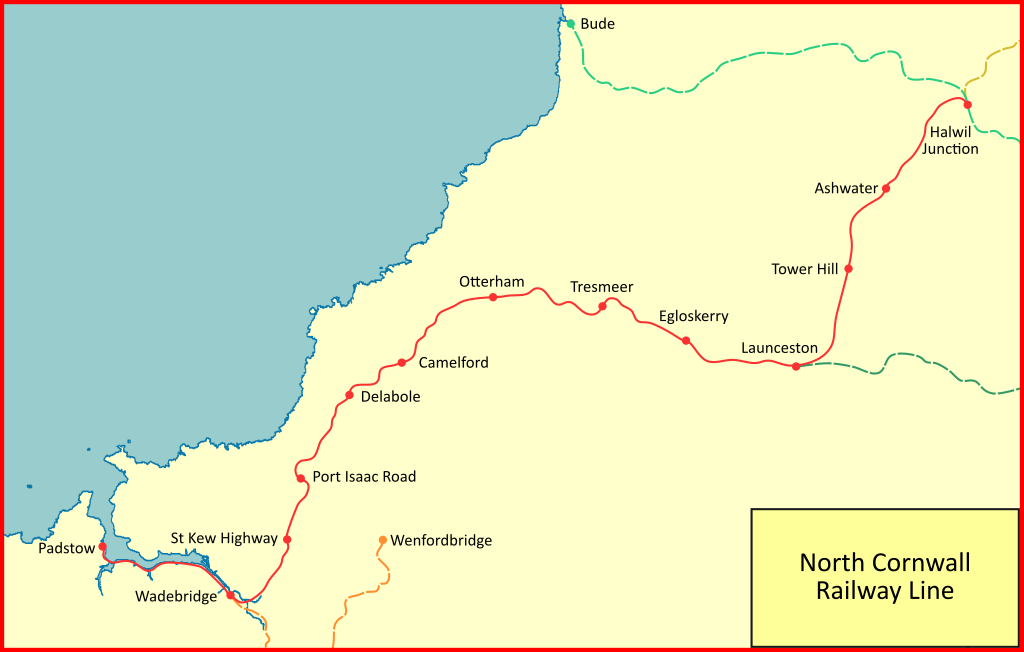

North Cornwall Railway Company
Overview
- Dates of operation: 1886–1922
- Successor: London & South Western Railway

The North Cornwall Railway (NCR) also known as the North Cornwall Line, was a standard gauge railway line running from Halwill in Devon, to Padstow in Cornwall, at a distance of 49 miles 67 chains (49.84 miles, 80.21 km) via Launceston, Camelford and Wadebridge. The line was opened in late 19th century by the North Cornwall Railway Company with support throughout much of its construction and existence by the London and South Western Railway (LSWR).

The railway line was part of a drive by the LSWR to expand its influence in the South West, connect its rail network with the Bodmin and Wadebridge line, and to develop both holiday and freight traffic to Cornwall. The LSWR had opened a line connecting Exeter with Holsworthy in 1879, and by encouraging the NCR it planned to create railway access to previously inaccessible parts of the northern coastal area.

As part of the 1923 railway groupings, the North Cornwall line came under the full ownership of LSWR, as the LSWR itself came under the ownership of Southern Railway. From 1948 the line was nationalised and brought under British Railways, where it remained until the line's closure in 1967 as a part of the Beeching Axe. Today the NCR's trackbed is used for the Camel Trail and the heritage Launceston Steam Railway.

In his tribute to the network of railway lines operated by the LSWR in North and West Devon and North Cornwall, T. W. E. Roch wrote that "There are few more fascinating lines than the one which leads to North Cornwall from Okehampton."

== History ==
=== Background ===
In the 19th century, Padstow was an important fishing port, but it was hampered by lack of land communication with its markets. The Bodmin and Wadebridge Railway opened in 1834, but it limited its horizons to connecting the harbour at Wadebridge to the immediate hinterland.

A Main line railway connection reached Cornwall with the opening of the Cornwall Railway in 1859, a company allied with other companies making up a broad gauge alliance, led by the Great Western Railway (GWR). The Cornwall Railway ran east to west in the southern part of the county, and it had exhausted its financial resources in building its line through the difficult terrain.

The struggle to achieve railway dominance in the West Country was fierce between the GWR and the rival London and South Western Railway (LSWR) company. The LSWR had the intention of reaching Cornwall with a standard gauge line, but found necessity in concentrating its resources further east, it had been unable to make progress towards connecting Cornwall into its network. In 1847 it had purchased the Bodmin and Wadebridge Railway, at a time when the nearest section of its own network was at Bishopstoke (Eastleigh).

Through the medium of nominally independent aligned local companies, the LSWR had reached Lydford (Note: At the time spelt as "Lidford") in Devon in 1874, which acted as an interchange to Plymouth Millbay via the South Devon Railway, and in 1879 the LSWR built a branch from Meldon Junction, west of Okehampton, to Holsworthy in north west Devon.

=== Line construction and staggered opening ===
North Cornwall Railway Act 1882
- Act of Parliament
- Parliament of the United Kingdom
- Long title: An Act for incorporating the North Cornwall Railway Company and authorising them to make and maintain the North Cornwall Railway and for authorising arrangements between them and the London and South-western Railway Company and for other purposes
- Citation: 45 & 46 Vict. c. ccliv

Dates
- Royal assent: 18 August 1882

Text of statute as originally enacted

The North Cornwall Railway Company, supported by the LSWR, was established to develop the northern part of the Cornish peninsula; its line was to leave the Okehampton–Holsworthy line at Halwill Junction and continue through Launceston to Wadebridge Station. The prospectus of the NCR company indicated that an extension of 24 miles (39 km) would be allow the railway to connect from Wadebridge to the county town of Truro.

The North Cornwall Railway obtained its authorising act of Parliament, the North Cornwall Railway Act 1882 (45 & 46 Vict. c. ccliv) on 18 August, but money was scarce and construction was slow, so it was not until 21 July 1886 that the first section opened, and the line was completed in 1899. (In fact to facilitate raising capital, the company was segmented into several sections for financial purposes; the total authorised capital was £660,000 with borrowing powers of £220,000.) The LSWR was to work the line for 55% of gross receipts.

The line was opened in stages:

- Halwill to Launceston; 14 miles 57 chains (14.71 miles, 23.68 km); 21 July 1886
- Launceston to Tresmeer; 7 miles 75 chains (12.8 km); 28 July 1892 (Note: Wilson says 21 July 1892.)
- Tresmeer to Camelford; 9 miles 26 chains (15.0 km); 14 August 1893
- Camelford to Delabole; 2 miles 29 chains (3.8 km); 18 October 1893
- Delabole to Wadebridge; 10 miles 68 chains (17.5 km); 1 June 1895
- Wadebridge to Padstow; 5 miles 52 chains (9.1 km); 27 March 1899.

The Great Western Railway (GWR) already had a station at Launceston, opened in 1865, and the North Cornwall Railway station was built adjacent to it. At Wadebridge, the line joined with the Bodmin and Wadebridge line; the original station had been expanded when the GWR line from Bodmin was opened in 1888.

=== Commercial potential ===
The fishing activity at Padstow had long been declining, and the LSWR had hopes of reviving it. Their wishes were realised and a substantial increase of fish tonnage carried was experienced over the first years; a special connection to the fish quay had been provided. There was a large slate quarry at Delabole, at the time said to be the largest man-made excavation in the world and considerable traffic was derived from that.

Tourist and holiday passenger traffic was also sought, as by the end of the nineteenth century when the line was completed this business was well established at comparable locations elsewhere. In the 1920s the areas of Padstow and Wadebridge were described as 'formerly neglected' referring to the time before the railway was built, but the same guide book then continues to say that the only attraction in the area is 'yachting' although the golf course at St Enodoc is also listed as a reason to visit.

However apart from Launceston and Wadebridge the very long single-track line served only small rural communities, and never achieved the importance that its promoters had hoped for. Fish traffic and ice for the ships were always important commodities on the line, as was the seasonal holidaymaker traffic for Padstow and several resorts served indirectly by the railway.

=== Takeover by the LSWR ===
Worked throughout its existence by the LSWR, the North Cornwall Line was dependent on the larger company, and in 1894 terms were agreed for a sale to the LSWR.

=== Proposed extension onto Newquay and Truro ===
North Cornwall Railway Act 1894
- Act of Parliament
- Parliament of the United Kingdom
- Long title: An Act to Authorise the North Cornwall Railway Company to deviate certain parts of their railway and to construct new railways for other purposes
- Citation: 57 & 58 Vict. c. clxxxvi

Dates
- Royal assent: 17 August 1894

Text of statute as originally enacted

With progress being made in Line's construction, a parliamentary request was issued for a line from Padstow to Newquay and Truro, and from there with running powers over GWR lines to Falmouth and Penzance. This request was granted though the North Cornwall Railway Act 1894 (57 & 58 Vict. c. clxxxvi), which also included provisions for slight deviations in route and scheduling from previously approved plans. However, the extension was an aspiration for which there was no possibility of raising the necessary finance, and the plan was abandoned.

Despite the failure of the proposal, the GWR remained concerned by the prospect of further LSWR expansion, and it is said that this prompted the GWR to increase its presence in Cornwall. This resulted in the GWR constructing the Truro–Newquay Line, and the Par–Newquay Atlantic Coast Line.

=== Padstow harbour improvements ===
In 1911 a scheme was developed to improve the fishing harbour arrangements at Padstow; this was supported by the government and the LSWR; the company alone spent £10,350 on the dock wall and sidings and sheds and took up £30,000 of the harbour commissioners' bonds. The work was completed by 1920, by which time the LSWR was the dominant partner in the operation of the harbour.

=== Financial reconstruction ===
The building of the North Cornwall Line had been undertaken by four different financial entities for reasons of raising finance at a difficult time. In 1912 the LSWR chairman, Herbert Walker, proposed a capital reconstruction under which a single North Cornwall Railway Leased Line stock would be created from the four subsidiaries; £825,000 of capital was transferred in this way, the arrangement being approved in the South Western Railway Act 1913 (3 & 4 Geo. 5. c. lxxxviii) on 15 August 1913.

=== Grouping and nationalisation ===
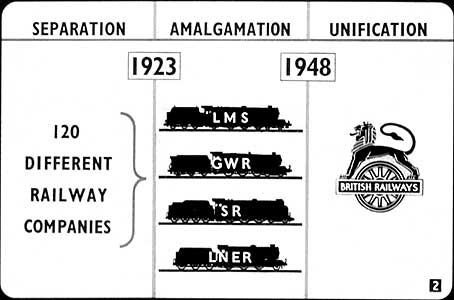
British Rail filmstrip showing how the railways were unified under BR.

Under the provisions of the Grouping Act, on 1 January 1923, the railway companies of Great Britain were amalgamated into "The Big Four" companies. As a part of railway grouping, the North Cornwall Railway was absorbed by the LSWR which itself became a "constituent company" of the newly established Southern Railway. While the process of grouping took practical effect at the beginning of 1923, although a number of technical requirements resulted in the official transfer dates varying.

Under the provisions of the Transport Act 1947 the railways of Great Britain were nationalised into British Railways at the beginning of 1948, with the North Cornwall Line was placed into the British Rail Southern Region.

=== Line closure ===
Throughout its existence the North Cornwall line had operated against the odds, its long line serving sparsely populated and relatively unproductive terrain. As the costs of unproductive railway operation came into focus following the Beeching Report, the line had only its romantic appeal to offer, with even the highly seasonal summer holiday traffic falling away in the face of road transport and more attractive destinations. It closed on 3 October 1966, the Wadebridge to Padstow section continuing to be served by Bodmin trains until it too closed on 28 January 1967.

With the cessation of Padstow–Wadebridge services, Cornwall County Council purchased the trackbed from British Railways and in 1980 converted the bed to into the Camel Trail. A section of trackbed from Launceston is now in use as the narrow gauge Launceston Steam Railway.

== Train services ==
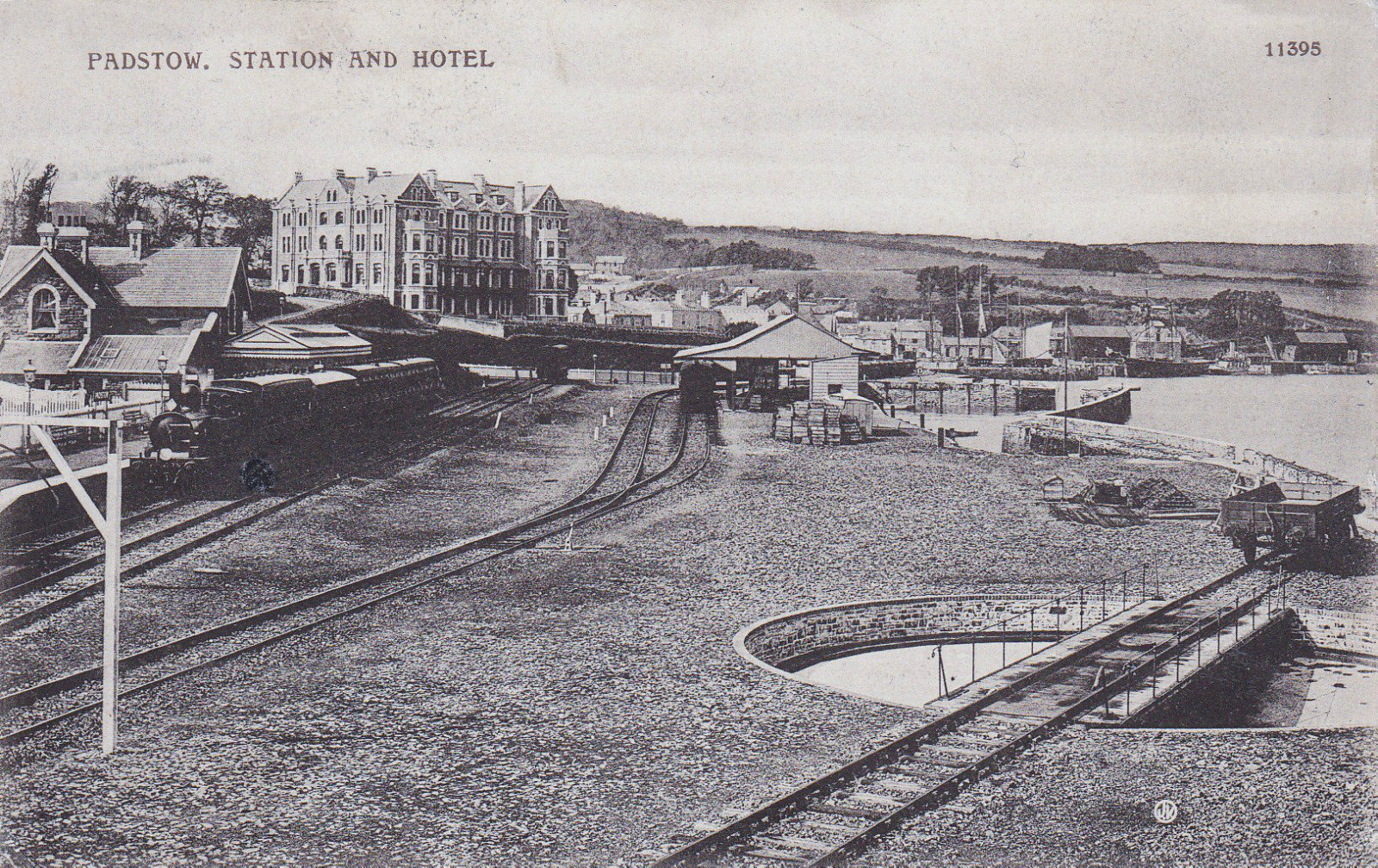
Padstow station in 1889

The thin population meant that little intermediate traffic was generated, and a passenger service of four or five daily trains was operated almost throughout the life of the line.

The route between Launceston and Padstow was not designed for speed. The single line route required several sections at a gradient of 1 in 73 to allow for the rise from near Sea Level at Padstow to a summit at 860 feet above Sea Level between Camelford and Otterham and the line constantly curved, typically with a radius of 30 chains, in order to follow the contours and avoid costly earthworks. The result was a typical journey from Halwill to Padstow that occupied 90 to 100 minutes down and up to 110 minutes in the up direction. These times were reduced over the years with more powerful locomotives so that by the 1940s journey times between Launceston and Padstow were typically 80 minutes in the down direction and 90 minutes in the up. The maximum speed permitted on the North Cornwall line was 55 mph.

The 1938 Bradshaw's Railway Guide shows five down and six up trains a day (Monday to Friday) on the line, plus a first up train from Launceston to Halwill and a last up train from Padstow to Launceston, and a last down train from Halwill to Launceston. All the trains called at all stations with the exception of the Atlantic Coast Express, the 11:00 from Waterloo, which ran non-stop Exeter St Davids to Halwill, then Launceston, Otterham, Camelford, Delabole, Port Isaac Road and Wadebridge, arriving in Padstow at 4:24 after a 260-mile (420 km) journey. The train conveyed a restaurant car throughout. The Saturday service was similar, although congestion earlier in the journey meant a slightly slower journey. There was no Sunday service.

Tender engines were preferred on the line, the Adams Jubilee class being dominant at first, supplanted by the T9 class 4-4-0 being dominant in the Edwardian era. Until the mid-1940s the weight restriction over Meldon Viaduct and the short turntable at Padstow prevented anything larger than the Southern Railway mixed traffic 2-6-0 types from working over the line. However, after the turntable was replaced, the Bulleid Light Pacific locomotives were able to use the line. On summer Saturdays in the 1950s, some trains loaded to ten coaches, and in that era the Standard 2-6-4T class came into use on the line.

While the GWR could easily serve major Devon and Cornwall resorts on its main line and branches, the rugged North Cornwall terrain prevented this. However Southern National omnibus connections gave journey options: Tintagel and Boscastle had good connections from Camelford, Newquay from Wadebridge, and Bedruthan and Trevone Bay from Padstow. Otterham is marked in the timetable as being the "Station for Wilsey Down and Davidstow (2½ miles) and Crackington Haven (5 miles)".

By 1964 the passenger service had declined to four trains a day plus a Halwill to Launceston short return journey.

Motive power in later years had been the T9 4-4-0 Greyhounds and the N class 2-6-0s but with Bulleid Pacifics, often on uneconomically short trains, putting in an appearance.

== Topography ==
=== Route ===
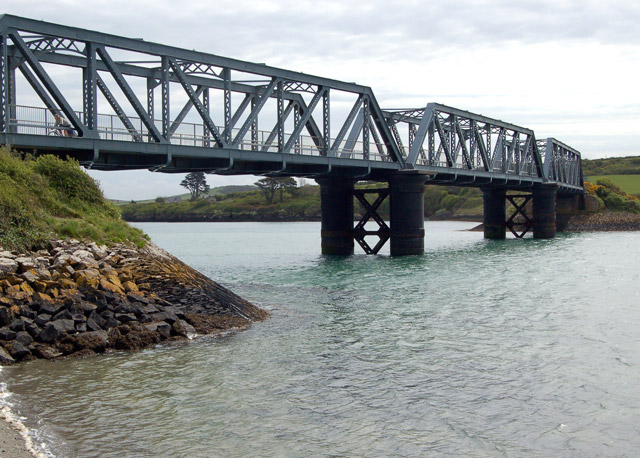
The North Cornwall line crossed Petherick Creek on this three-span iron bridge, now used to carry the Camel Trail cycleway

From Halwill the line describes a loop turning from north to south west; it runs downhill at gradients of 1 in 74 and 1 in 82 to join the valley of the River Carey, following this down for nearly 10 miles (16 km) to cross the River Tamar just east of Launceston, the first station actually in Cornwall. From a summit at Otterham, 800 feet (244 m), the line descends into the upper reaches of the Camel valley, passing through Camelford Station over 2 miles west of Camelford town and then leaving the valley for a gentle climb to the coastal uplands.

At Delabole the line skirts the slate quarry, and then descends to the Allen valley, diving briefly through Trelill Tunnel (333 yards, 304 m), before returning to the Camel valley, crossing the river and joining the Bodmin and Wadebridge line into Wadebridge station.

Once past Wadebridge the character changes as the line hugs the tidal River Camel until crossing Little Petherick Creek over a three-span iron bridge and rounding Dennis Hill, it reaches Padstow station which was located on a narrow strip of reclaimed land with the Atlantic Ocean, visible in the distance.

=== Stations and features ===
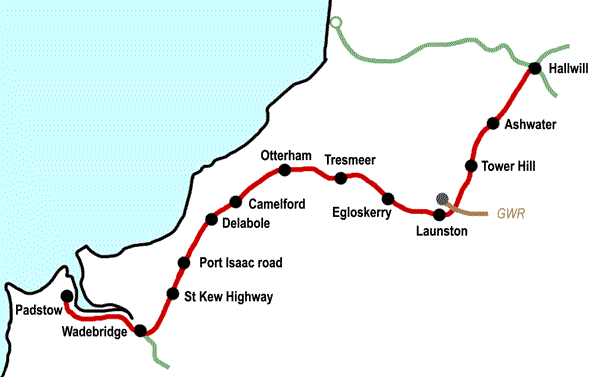
Map of stations on the North Cornwall Railway

Halwill and Beaworthy (209m 60ch); LSWR station on the Holsworthy line; renamed Halwill Junction March 1887

Ashwater (214m 67ch); see Ashwater railway station

Tower Hill (218m 35ch); see Tower Hill railway station (Devon)

Launceston (223m 34ch); the first station on the line in Cornwall, adjacent to the GWR station.

Egloskerry (227m 58ch); Egloskerry station (Cornish: Egloskeri) (50.6519°N 4.4507°W) opened on 3 October 1892, and had a simple layout with only four points. There was a passing loop, and the station building and signal box were both located on the up platform, with a siding behind serving cattle pens. There was a level crossing at the down end of the station immediately at the platforms' end, the only one between Launceston and Wadebridge. The population of the surrounding area dropped between the building of the railway in the early 1890s and closure in the 1960s; it was always sparse and revenue poor resulting in various economies over the years. In the late 1920s responsibility for the station was passed to the stationmaster at Otterham, and in 1930 the block instruments were moved from the signalbox to the Booking Office under the charge of a porter-signalman. The goods facilities closed on 9 May 1961 and the goods sidings were removed the following year. The station closed on 3 October 1966. The former station building is now a guest house.

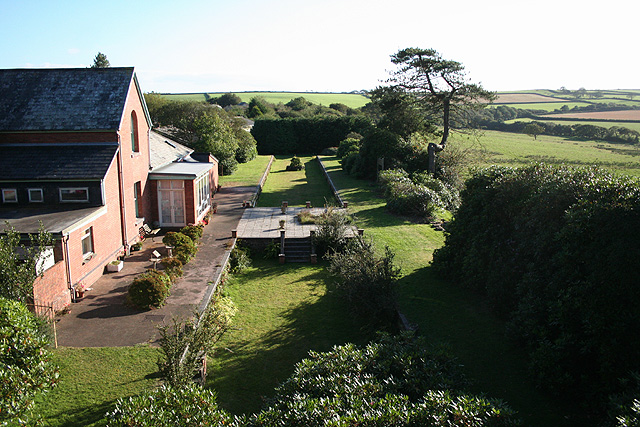
The old station of Tresmeer

Tresmeer (231m 29ch); Tresmeer station (Cornish: Trewasmeur) (50.6699°N 4.5171°W) was located in a nearby hamlet, Splatt, and was the closest station to Crackington Haven; this kept passenger numbers up until a bus from Launceston started running in 1935. The station was due to open on 1 July 1892 but a landslip in an adjacent cutting delayed this until 28 July. As at all stations on the line there was a passing loop here, with the station building on the down platform and signal box on the up platform. A single siding behind the down platform gave access to a goods shed and loading dock; goods facilities officially ceased in September 1964 although the line to the loading dock had been removed three months earlier. The siding and passing loop were officially taken out of use on 14 November 1964, with the station becoming unstaffed on 6 January 1965. The station closed on 3 October 1966. The station is now a guest house.

Otterham (236m 20ch); Otterham station (Cornish: Prasotri) (50.6748°N 4.6130°W) opened on 14 August 1893 was situated in bleak sparsely populated country at the junction of the A39 and the B3262. At 850 ft (260 m) above sea level it occupied the most exposed section of the line, open to the fury of Atlantic gales in winter - the LSWR planted a group of Scots Pines on the embankment above the down platform to provide some shelter from weather. A footpath linked the station with the village, which was more than a mile away: by road the distance was 2 miles (3.2 km). Otterham Station was also the name of a hamlet which grew up near the station.

The down platform was provided with a waiting shelter while the station building and signal box were on the up platform; all three were built of local stone. A single siding on the up side provided access to a loading dock, but there was no goods shed. A second siding parallel to the first was added later. In 1928 Otterham returned the lowest ticket sales on the line. The station was host to a Southern Railway camping coach from 1935 to 1939. Following the withdrawal of goods facilities on the line on 7 September 1964, the passing loop, sidings, and signal box were officially taken out of use on 7 February 1965, and the trackwork was removed that October. Under the Western Region the station was unstaffed from 6 December 1965 and appeared as Otterham Halt in WR timetables. The station closed on 3 October 1966, and for many years after closure operated as a caravan site. More recently a new road of houses has occupied the trackbed at the eastern end of the old platforms.The station building is now a private residence.

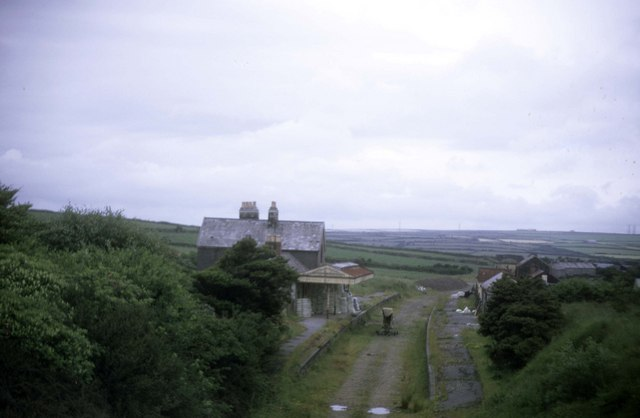
Camelford station in 1971 looking towards Launceston from the now-demolished road bridge. Photo by Roger Geach

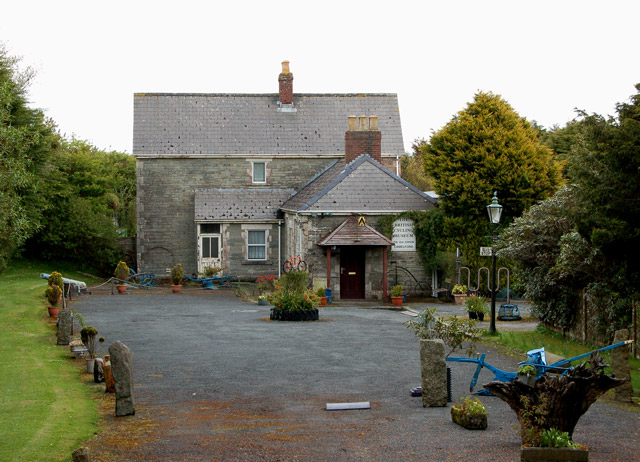
The former station building at Camelford station is now a private residence and former cycle museum

Camelford (240m 56ch); (Cornish: Reskammel) (50.6389°N 4.6871°W) was situated more than 2 miles (3.2 km) from the town "at a road junction in wild country almost devoid of trees". The station had a passing loop with the station building (including canopy) and signal box on the up platform. Like the waiting shelter on the down platform, the buildings were constructed from local stone. As elsewhere on the line, no footbridge was provided. Cattle pens were provided on the single siding, with the goods shed on a loop between the siding and headshunt.

The station opened on 14 August 1893, with station signs proclaiming "Camelford for Boscastle and Tintagel". Camelford was the busiest intermediate station between Launceston and Wadebridge, but the distance from the town kept the passenger numbers low: in 1928 there was an average of just over 20 tickets issued daily, with 35 collected, and this number steadily declining with improved road transport. No alterations were made to the station layout throughout its life; the sidings were officially taken out of use on 30 November 1965 after the end of goods traffic the previous year, but the signal box and passing loop remained operational until closure on 3 October 1966.

The small settlement of Camelford Station grew up around the railway and the station site was for a time occupied by the British Cycling Museum (subsequently closed). More information about the area can be found in the article on Slaughterbridge. The station is now a private residence.

Delabole (243m 05ch); (Cornish: Delyow Boll) The adjacent Delabole Slate quarry, Delabole station (50.6226°N 4.7268°W) resulted in considerable outwards mineral traffic. The station opened on 18 October 1893 after the slate company donated 1.5 miles of trackbed free to the LSWR. It was equipped with a passing loop and two platforms. A single siding was provided behind the up platform, which was where the signal box was sited. On the downside the platform had the station building and a short loading dock with the goods shed on a further siding running behind the platform. A single road through engine shed was provided, with a turntable beyond between the goods shed and a line extending to the quarry. There was a considerable narrow gauge tramway network within the quarry, in existence before the construction of the North Cornwall line. There had earlier been a three-foot gauge network with a four track incline, but by 1879 this had been converted to a 2-feet gauge system with a six-track incline.

As it was situated in the village itself, the station was better used than many on the route, and the proximity of the quarry ensured that freight receipts remained healthy. Goods services were withdrawn on 7 September 1964 and the loading dock was removed; the siding on the down side had been removed some time previously. The station closed on 3 October 1966. The station building is now in use as a private residence, and houses have been built on the site of the up platform.

Betty & Tom's siding (246m 77ch); the siding was accessed by a facing point when travelling in the up direction, so that trains would leave Wadebridge and then run round at Delabole in order to reverse uphill into the siding. The key to the ground frame that controlled access was attached to the single-line token. The siding was rather short, and was effectively a headshunt for a further pair of short sidings that allowed the wagons to be loaded. The siding served Tregildren Quarry and roadstone was regularly transported to the midlands, and ballast for railway use. Laid in 1922, the siding may have ceased operation some time before 1960 and had certainly been removed by 1964.

Port Isaac Road (247m 13ch); (Cornish: Fordh Porthysek) the station (50.5764°N 4.7703°W) was three miles (5 km) from Port Isaac itself, and opened on 1 June 1895, and had a passing loop and a single siding with headshunt that served a goods shed and loading dock. All buildings were of local stone; the station building and signal box locking room were on the up platform, the small waiting shelter on the down platform, and the goods shed.

From the time of opening until 1927 there were 7 stationmasters; from that year all of the stations between Camelford and Wadebridge came under the stationmaster at Camelford Station. Ticket sales were low, with nearly 4500 annually in 1928, this dropping to under 2000 in 1936; freight dropped in a similar way over the same period. The station was host to a Southern Railway camping coach from 1937 to 1939. The station layout never changed until the track to the loading dock was removed in June 1964 and the station siding was taken out of use in December 1965. Despite the station being unstaffed from 6 December 1965 the passing loop was retained until the line closed on 3 October 1966. The station buildings are the best-preserved example on the line.

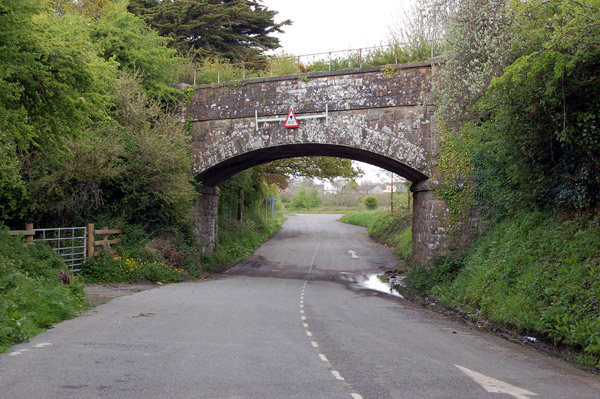
The bridge east of St Kew Highway which carried the line over the A39 road. This section of the road has been bypassed to avoid the low bridge

St Kew Highway (249m 64ch); (Cornish: Fordhveur) The station here (50.5434°N 4.7807°W) was built at an existing settlement on the main Camelford to Wadebridge road and about 2 miles (3.2 km) south of St Kew village. Opened on 1 June 1895, there was a passing loop and a single siding of 15 wagon capacity with headshunt that served a goods shed and cattle dock with an additional short spur to an end-loading ramp, these all being situated on the west (up) side behind the station buildings. Both lines through the station had platforms although the down platform had no buildings and was only accessible via a foot crossing at the down end of the station. The station building itself, like the goods shed, was substantially constructed out of local stone, as was the locking room of the signal box which was sited off the down end of the up platform.

From 1927 all of the stations between Camelford and Wadebridge came under the stationmaster at Camelford Station, but up to that time St Kew Highway had six stationmasters. Traffic was never very heavy and by the late 1930s was averaging five passengers per day, less than a third of that ten years earlier. The passing loop was extended in 1939, but the up loop, sidings and signal box were taken out of use on 21 November 1965 as goods services had ceased on 7 September the previous year meaning that for the last year of operation, the only platform in use was the "old" down platform which was accessed by crossing the line on foot. The station was unstaffed from 6 December 1965 and closed on 3 October 1966, although the building functioned for some time as a guest house and is now a private residence.

Wadebridge Junction (253m 02ch); when the North Cornwall Railway was constructed this was the point of convergence with the Bodmin and Wadebridge Railway. From 3 February 1907 the trackbed was widened and a second independent track was provided with the two lines running parallel to Wadebridge East signal box. As a result the junction signal box and associated siding were abolished.

Wadebridge (253m 72ch); (Cornish: Ponswad) Wadebridge Station buildings are currently in use as "The John Betjeman Centre"..

Padstow (259m 43ch); (Cornish: Lannwedhenek)

== Literary references ==
The North Cornwall Railway is commemorated in Sir John Betjeman's classic verse autobiography Summoned by Bells. Betjeman travelled from London to his childhood holiday home in Trebetherick:

"The emptying train, wind in the ventilators,
Puffs out of Egloskerry to Tresmeer
Through minty meadows, under bearded trees,
And hills upon whose sides, the clinging farms hold bible Christians
Can it really be that this same carriage came from Waterloo?
On Wadebridge's platform what a breath of sea scented the Camel valley!

Soft air, soft Cornish rains, and silence after steam...."

While T.W.E. Roche in his memoir of the Southern lines west of Exeter says of the North Cornwall Railway:

There are few more fascinating lines than the one which leads to North Cornwall from Okehampton.

== See also ==
- Southern Railway routes west of Salisbury
