= Delabole =

Village and civil parish in Cornwall, England

Coordinates: 50.622°N 4.733°W

Delabole: Cornish: Delyow Boll
- Location within Cornwall
- Population: 2,500 (2001 Estimate)
- OS grid reference: SX070840
- Civil parish: Delabole
- Unitary authority: Cornwall
- Ceremonial county: Cornwall
- Region: South West
- Country: England
- Sovereign state: United Kingdom
- Post town: DELABOLE
- Postcode district: PL33
- Dialling code: 01840
- Police: Devon and Cornwall
- Fire: Cornwall
- Ambulance: South Western
- UK Parliament: North Cornwall

Delabole (Cornish: Delyow Boll) is a large village and civil parish in north Cornwall, England, United Kingdom, which lies approximately two miles (3 km) west of Camelford.

The village of Delabole came into existence in the early 20th century; it is named after the Delabole Quarry. Three hamlets – Pengelly, Meadrose (/ˈmedrəʊz/) and Rockhead – and the hamlet of Delabole, south of the quarry, are shown on the earliest one-inch Ordnance Survey map of 1813. When the North Cornwall Railway arrived, the station was named Delabole after the quarry, and the three hamlets were absorbed into Delabole. It is said to be the third highest village in Cornwall. Treligga military airfield and HMS Vulture II, an aerial bombing and gunnery range, were situated west of the village.

Delabole lies within the Cornwall Area of Outstanding Natural Beauty (AONB).

== Toponymy ==
The name Delabole derives from the Cornish language, as do the names of the hamlets of Pengelly and Medrose which comprise today's village. Delabole comes from the Cornish Delyowboll. The name "delyow" is the historic name for a local stream, and the word boll could come from two places. It could be a soft-mutation of the Cornish word poll (pool), however, it could be an incorrect mutation of toll (hole), which should mutate to doll. Therefore, the meaning could be extracted as 'pool on the delyow stream' or 'pit by the delyow stream'. As the name originally designated the quarry, either name would make sense, given the collection of water at the bottom of the quarry or the crater created.

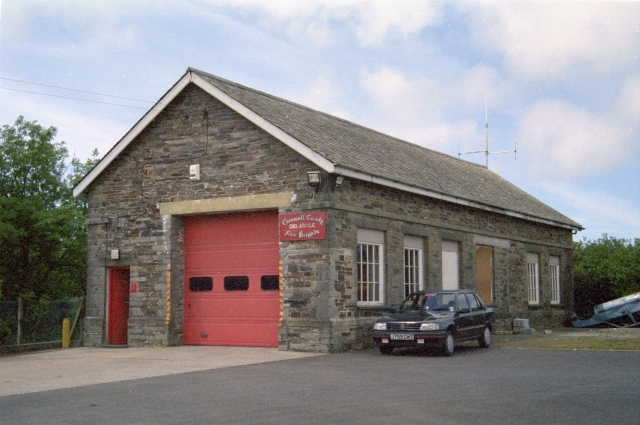
Delabole Fire Station

The names Pengelly and Medrose also come from the Cornish language. The original Cornish name of Pengelly is Penn-an-gelli. This construction uses the base words penn (head or end) and kelli (grove). As with many words in Cornish, when a preposition is added the initial letter is mutated. Therefore, kelli would become an gelli (the grove), giving the meaning 'end of the grove'. The name Medrose is also a descriptive name coming from medhros meaning 'middle of the heath'.

The local names "Deli" (grid ref. SX 079,840), "Delinuth" and "Delamere" are also related to "delyow" which has the meaning "place of leaves" according to Craig Weatherhill. Delinuth and Delamere mean "new Deli" and "great Deli" respectively.

== History ==
The manor of Delabole (Deliou) was recorded in the Domesday Book (1086) when it was held by Roger from Robert, Count of Mortain. There was one hide of land and land for 4 ploughs. There were 1 plough, 1 serf, 1 villein, 3 smallholders, 1 acre of meadow, 40 acres of pasture, 5 cattle and 25 sheep. The value of the manor was 10 shillings though it had formerly been worth 30 shillings.

Until 1 April 2021 the village formed part of the civil parish of St Teath, but it was separated into its own parish in time for the election of the first Delabole Parish Council in May 2021. The parish also covers the hamlets of Treligga and Westdowns.

== Economy ==
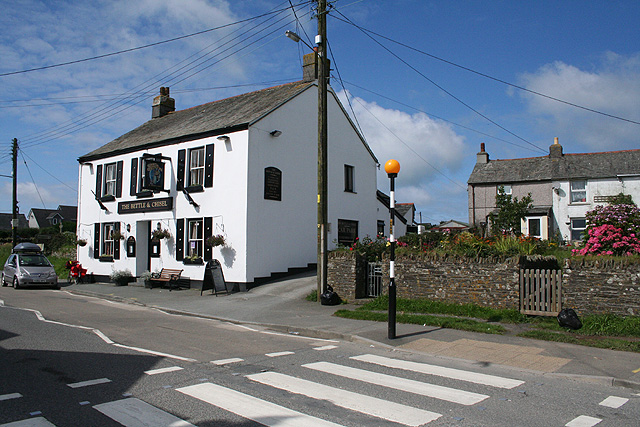
The Bettle and Chisel public house

Delabole was the birthplace of the Cornwall Air Ambulance. Businesses include Delabole Quarry and Delabole wind farm, the first commercial wind farm in the UK. The Gaia Energy Centre opened on the wind farm site in 2001 as a tourist attraction. It cost £5m and was intended to attract 150,000 visitors a year. It closed after three years of opening when it only achieved one tenth of the required visitor numbers. Most of the funding for the centre came from Europe, with £300,000 grants from Objective One and SWDRA, the South West Regional Development Agency.

=== Delabole Quarry ===
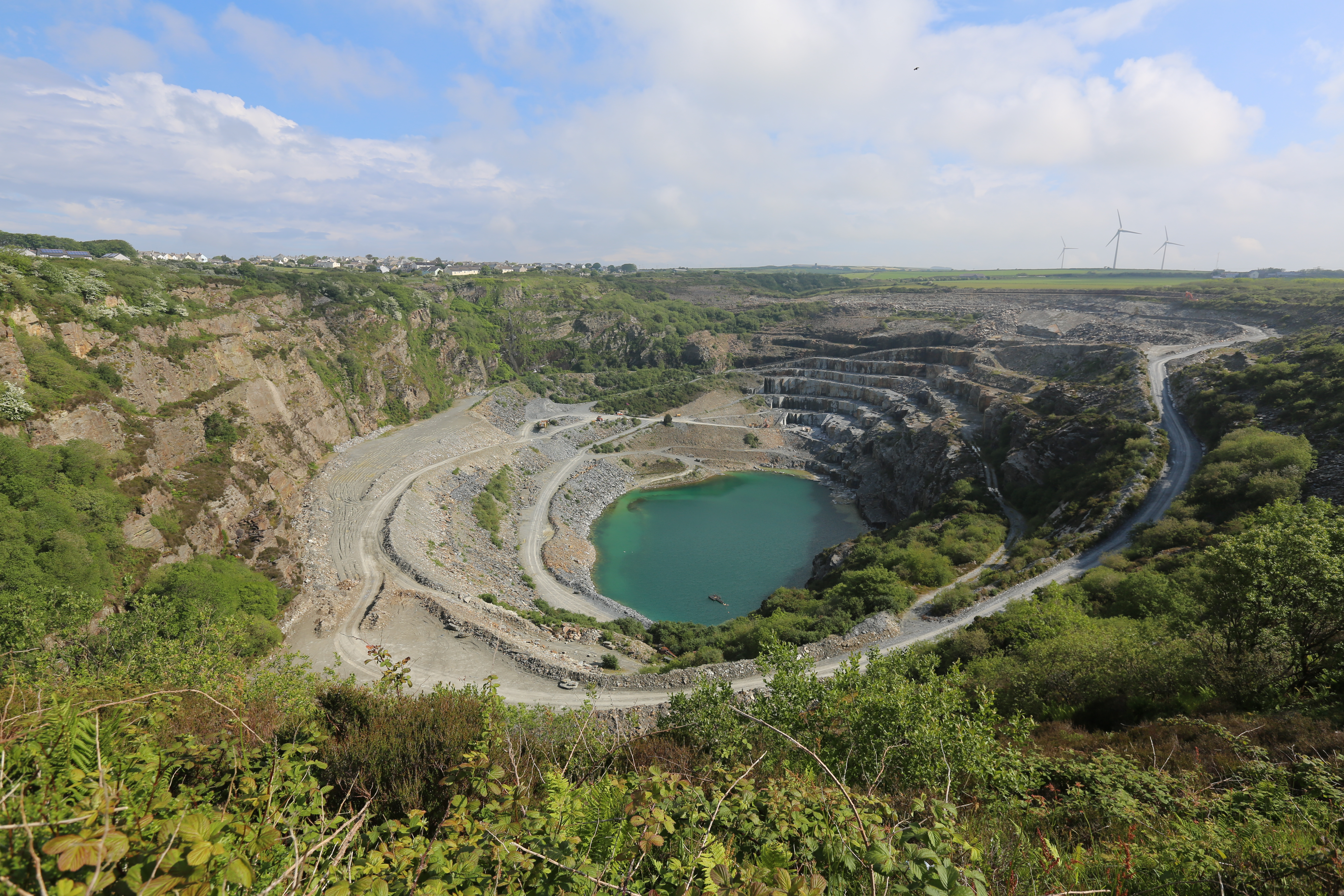
Delabole slate quarry

Delabole Quarry is one of the largest slate quarries in England and has been operated continuously since the 15th century, making it the oldest working slate quarry in England. Indeed, it is reputed that slate has been quarried here since the reign of King Stephen. In the reign of Elizabeth I the five quarries on the site of the now larger pit assumed considerable importance delivering slate to Brittany and the Netherlands. In 1841 the five quarries were combined to make the Old Delabole Slate Quarry.

The Old Delabole Slate Quarry Ltd was liquidated in 1977 by the company's bankers. It was run under receivership by Rio Tinto Zinc until 1999 when a local management team bought it out. In 2005, the majority shareholders bought out the entire share capital, creating a single family ownership, for the first time since 1842. In 1910, 500 people were employed at the quarry but this has since been reduced to 80, the decline due to the availability of cheaper roofing materials e.g. Welsh slate or prefabricated tiles. In 2007, only five skilled men worked in the pit and the total workforce was no more than 40.

Delabole Quarry was once the deepest man-made pit in the world, but this is no longer the case due to massive open-cast mines and quarries in America and Australia.

The quarry was connected to a narrow gauge railway worked by steam and diesel locomotives to move the slate: this is thought to have begun before 1834 and continued in use until after 1987. The North Cornwall Railway provided a freight service from Delabole between 1893 and 1964 (passenger services ended in 1966).

== Religion and education ==
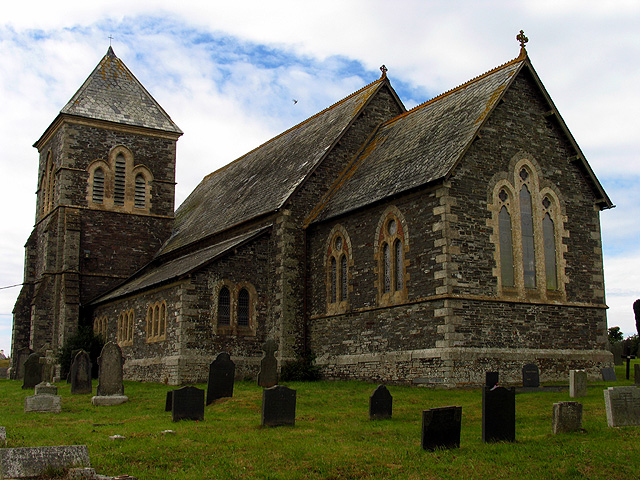
St John's Church, Delabole

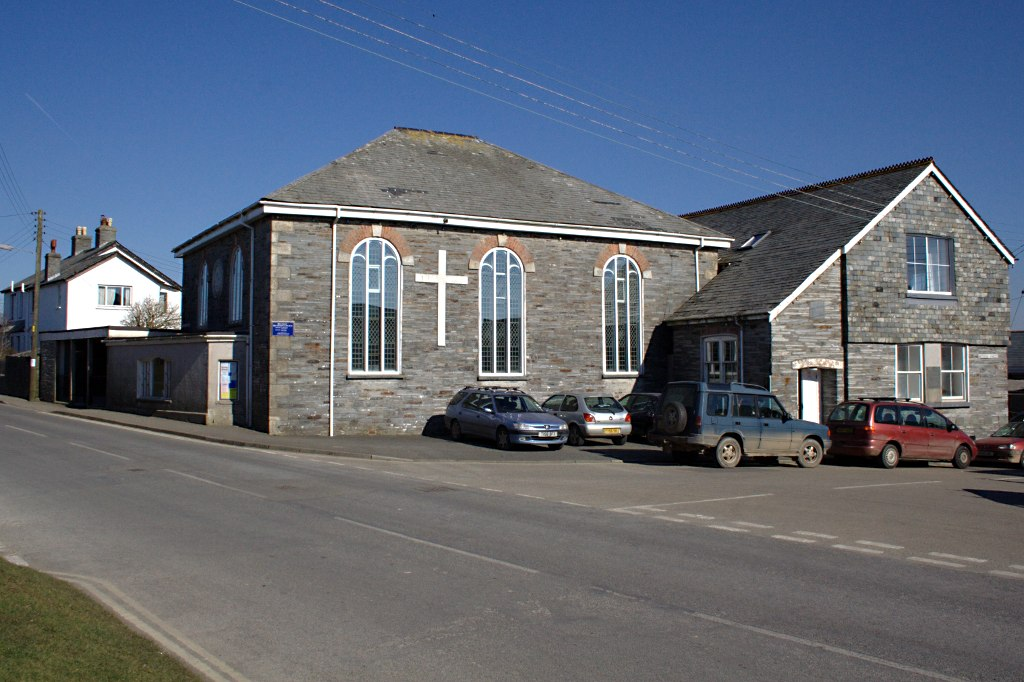
Delabole Methodist church

The foundation stone for the Anglican Church of St John was laid on the Feast of St Bartholomew in 1868; the church was built to the design of the architects Hine & Odgers (the parish church is at St Teath). The Methodist Chapel is about twenty years older and has a curious 'Italianate' porch. The village has a primary school and secondary education is provided at Sir James Smith's School, Camelford, about three miles away.

== Culture and community ==
Delabole is renowned for its annual carnival, one of the biggest in Cornwall. It was revived in 2001 after a break of nearly forty years. The week of events takes place in July each year. Until the 1950s there was a cinema: the Regal.

=== Sport ===
Delabole has a King George V Playing Field. Delabole United AFC (nicknamed the Slaters) is an association football team who play in the Duchy League.

There were Cornish wrestling tournaments, for prizes, held at the Commercial Hotel and at Medrose in the early 20th century.

== Notable people ==
- Moses Kellow, born at Delabole, operated the Parc Slate Quarry in Wales
- Philip Gross (born 1952), from Delabole, is a poet, novelist, playwright and children's writer
