= List of locomotives =

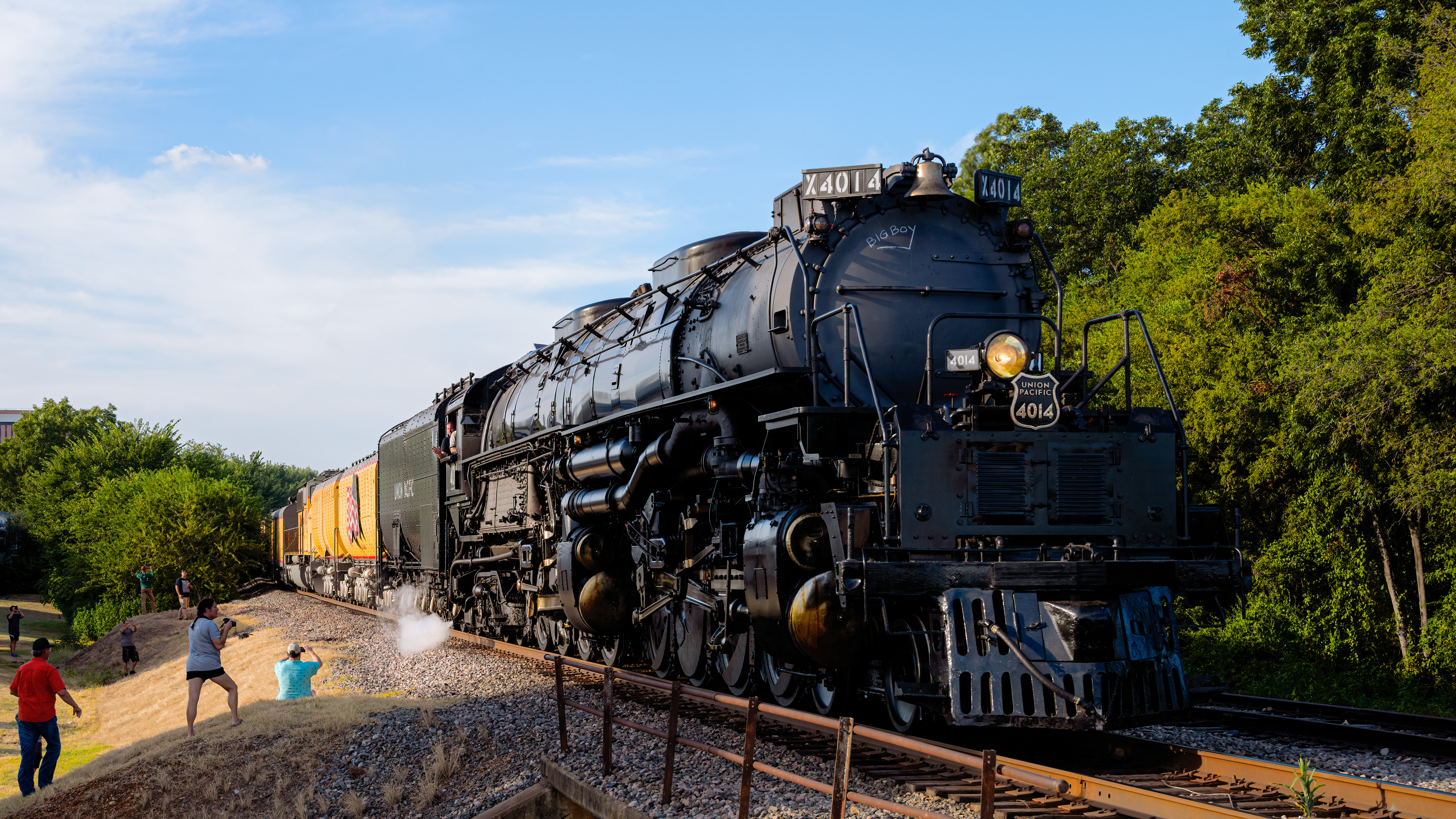
A Union Pacific Big Boy locomotive, which was built by the American Locomotive Company in 1941

This is a list of locomotives including notable locomotives that are preserved in museums or in heritage railways. For a list of locomotive types or models, please see List of locomotive classes.

A list of locomotive classes that have a corresponding Wikipedia article. A locomotive or engine is a rail transport vehicle that provides the motive power for a train. If a locomotive is capable of carrying a payload, it is usually referred to as a multiple unit, motor coach, railcar or power car; the use of these self-propelled vehicles is increasingly common for passenger trains, but rare for freight (see CargoSprinter).

Following is a mix of individual locomotives and of locomotive classes or models, organized by company.

For a list of preserved locomotives, such as those in museums, see List of preserved locomotives in the United States and List of preserved locomotives in Canada.

== Significant individual locomotives ==
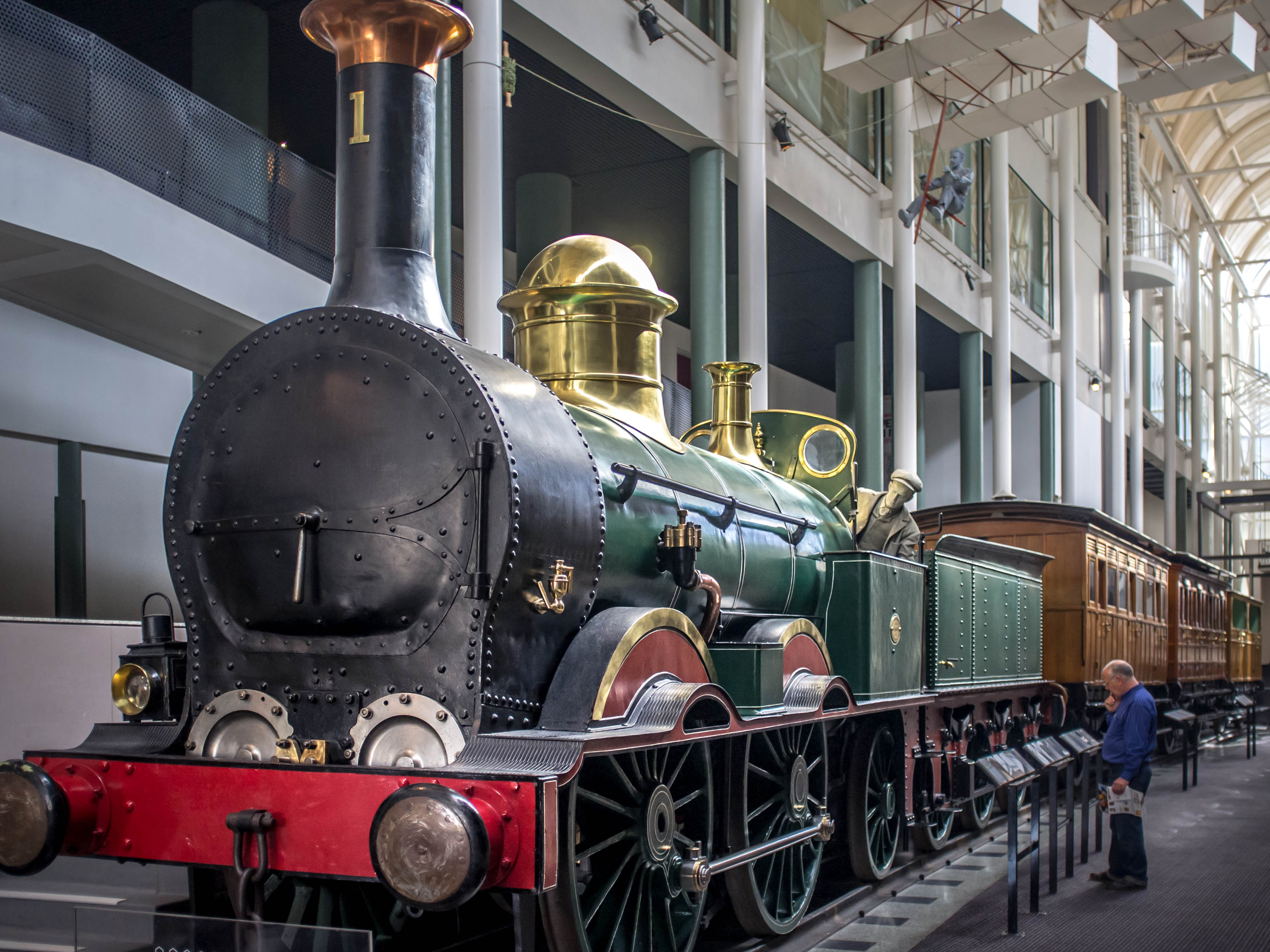
Locomotive No. 1

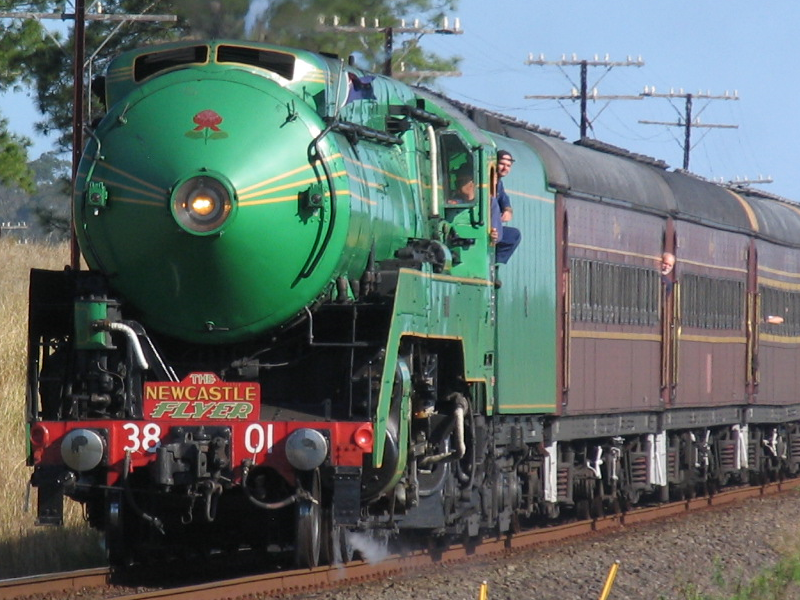
3801

of Australia

- Locomotive No. 1 (1854), oldest surviving locomotive from New South Wales Government Railways at Powerhouse Museum
- Queensland Railways A10 Neilson class 6 (1865), oldest surviving locomotive & oldest operating steam locomotive from Queensland at Workshops Rail Museum.
- Ballaarat (1871), oldest surviving locomotive from Western Australia at Busselton.
- Commonwealth Railways NF class 5 (1877), oldest surviving locomotive & oldest operating steam locomotive from Commonwealth Railways, Northern Territory at Pine Creek railway station.
- South Australian Railways V class class 9 (1877), oldest surviving locomotive from South Australia at Naracoorte.
- Victorian Railways F class 176 (1879), oldest surviving locomotive from Victoria at Newport Railway Museum.
- New South Wales Government Railwaysx10 class 1076 (1885), oldest operating steam locomotive from New South Wales Government Railways at Goulburn Rail Heritage Centre
- Tasmanian Government Railways C class 1 (1885), oldest surviving locomotive from Tasmania at West Coast Heritage Centre.
- Western Australian Government Railways A class 15 (1886), oldest operating steam locomotive from Western Australia privately owned in Victoria.
- Decauville 861 (1886), oldest operating steam locomotive from Victoria at Puffing Billy Railway.
- Fowler 5265 (1886), oldest operating steam locomotive from Tasmania at Don River Railway.
- South Australian Railways Yx class 141 (1892), oldest operating steam locomotive from South Australia at Pichi Richi Railway.
- Victorian Railways H220 (1941), largest locomotive built in Australia and the largest non-articulated steam locomotive to run on Australian railways
- 3801 (1943), Australia's most famous locomotive, star of A Steam Train Passes

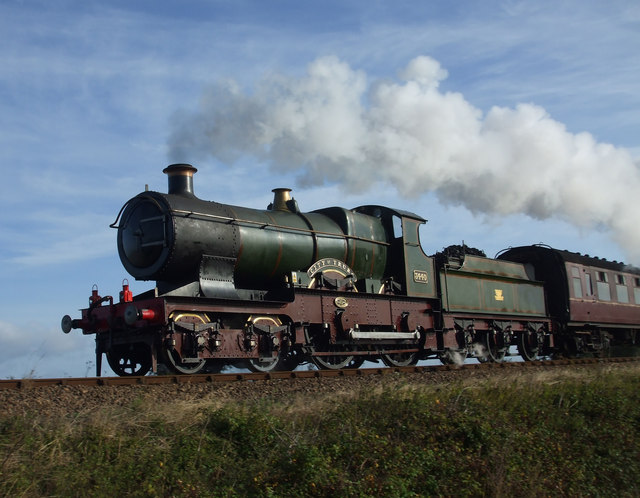
City of Truro

of the United Kingdom

- Salamanca (1812), first commercially successful steam locomotive, first to have two cylinders.
- Puffing Billy (1813-14), oldest surviving locomotive.
- City of Truro, a GWR 3700 Class 4-4-0 steam locomotive built in 1903 for the Great Western Railway (GWR) at Swindon Works to a design by George Jackson Churchward. Some believe the locomotive to be the first to attain a speed of 100 miles per hour (161 km/h) during a run from Plymouth to London Paddington in 1904.
- Flying Scotsman (1923), oldest operating steam locomotive.
- Mallard (1938), holder of world record speed for a steam locomotive of 126 miles per hour (203 km/h)

of the United States

- DeWitt Clinton (1831), influential in demonstrating cost-effectiveness and speed of railways, defeating canals.
- The General (1855) of the Great Locomotive Chase through Georgia in the American Civil War.

== Preserved locomotives ==
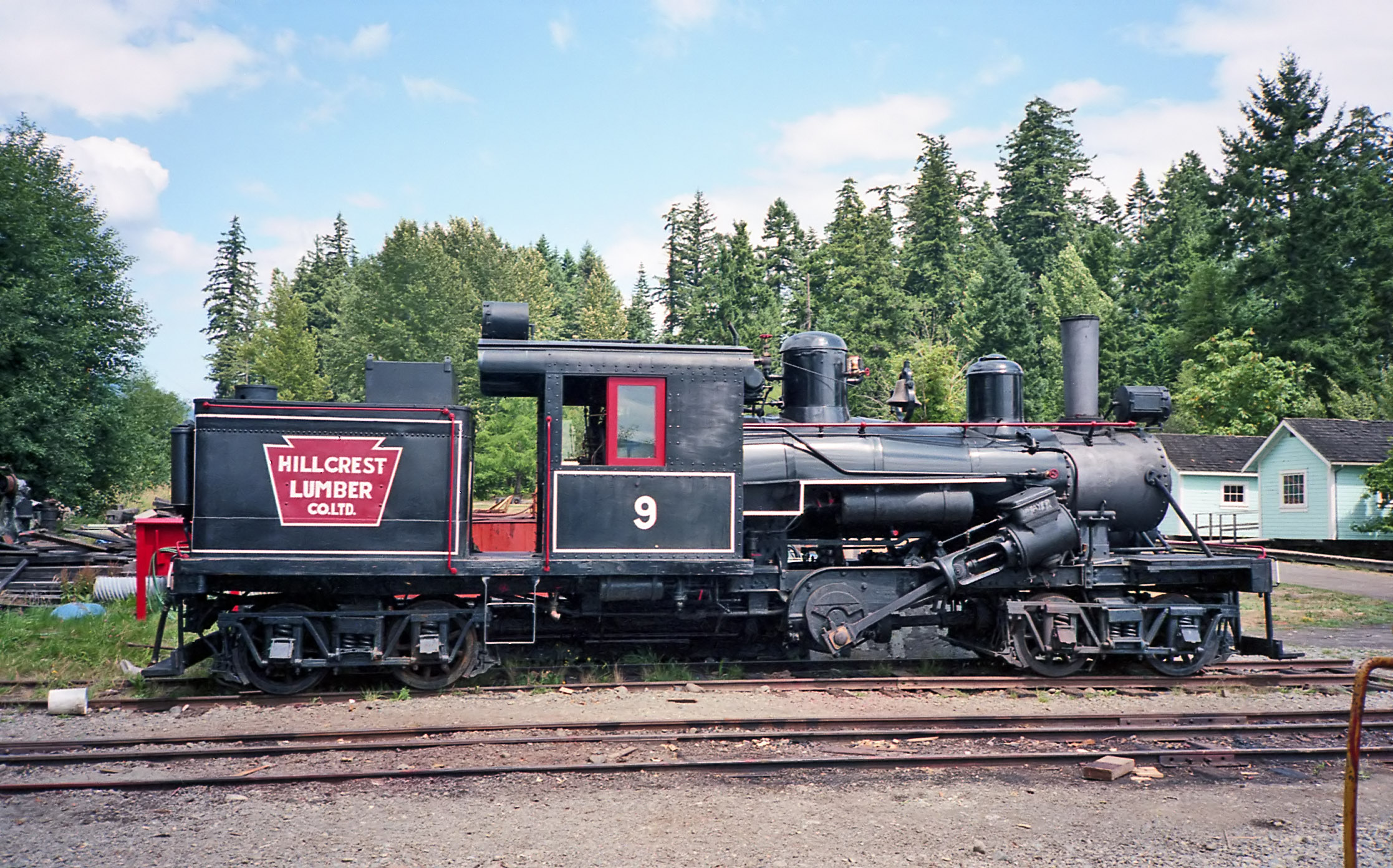
Hillcrest Lumber Company 9, in Duncan, British Columbia, Canada

These are historic locomotives preserved in museums, currently or formerly, or in heritage railways, currently or formerly, or otherwise. This is not intended to include deteriorating locomotives that are just still existing somewhere, without being restored or ever open to the public.

=== in China ===
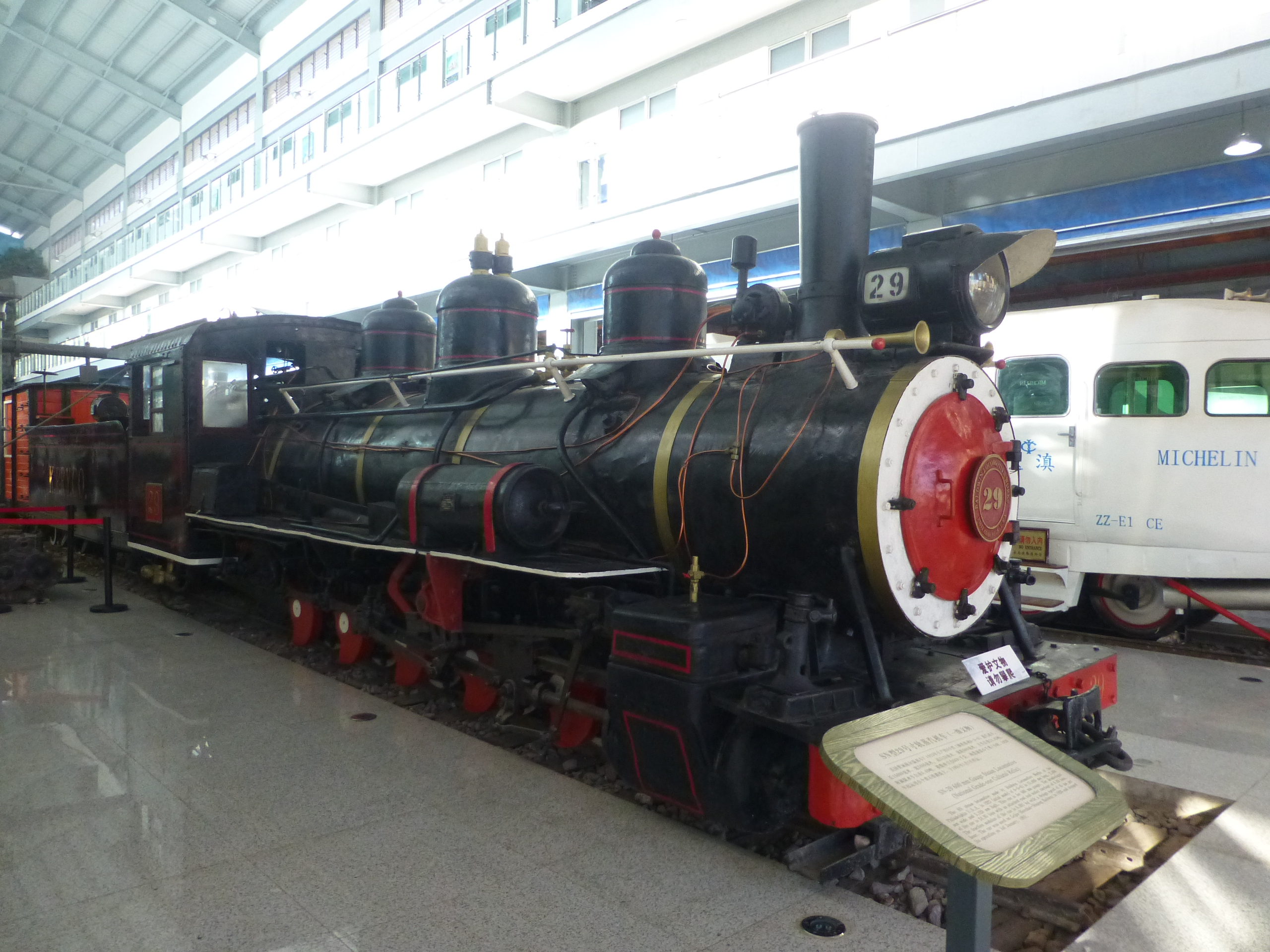
SN No. 29, at Yunnan Railway Museum

China has at least six preserved locomotives:

- Three in the China Railways SN class:
  - China Railways SN No.23, 0-10-0, in the China Railway Museum
  - China Railways SN No.26, 0-10-0, in the Shanghai Railway Museum,
  - China Railways SN No.29, 0-10-0, in the Yunnan Railway Museum.
- At least three more locomotives at the Yunnan Railway Museum

=== in India ===
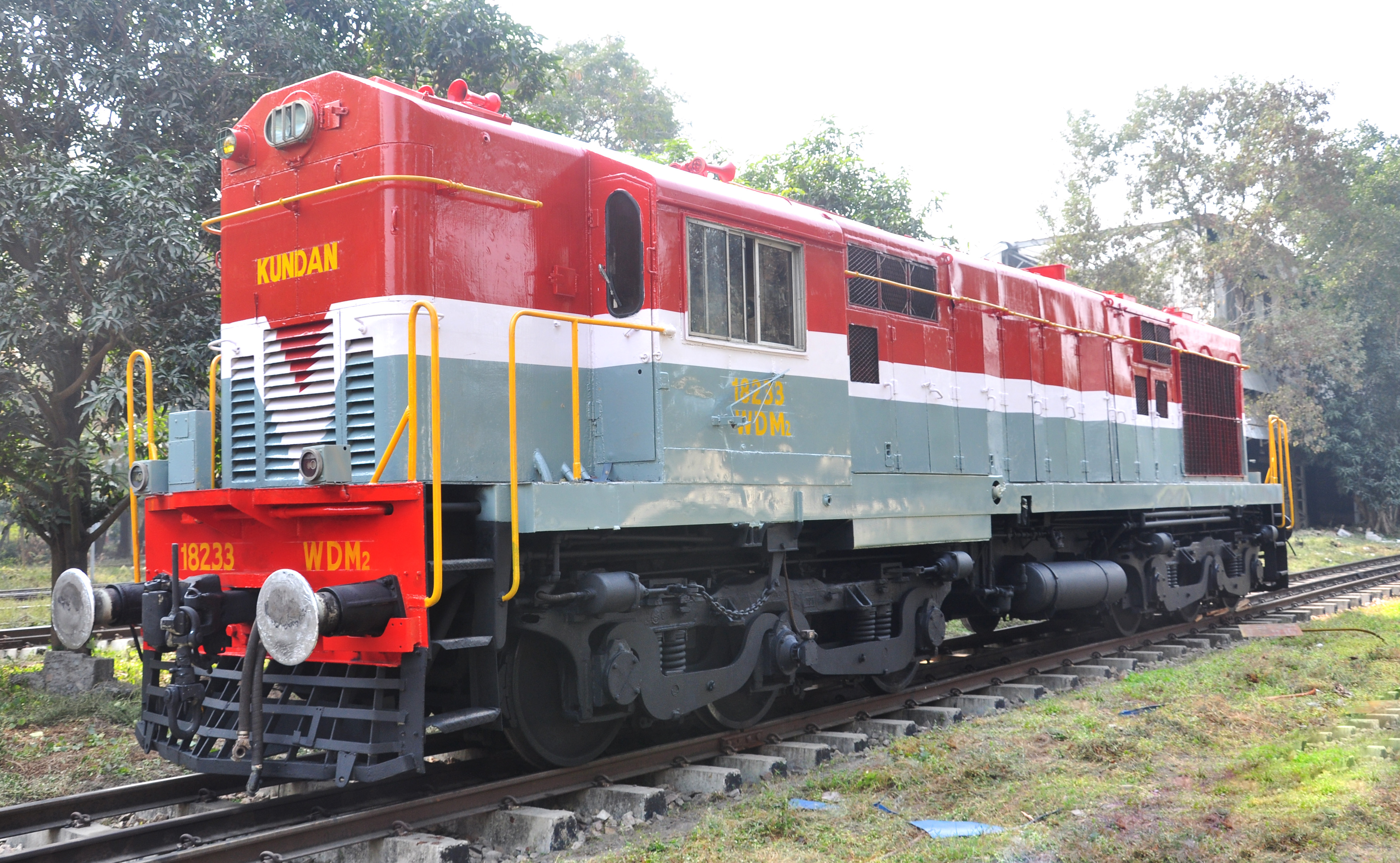
Kundan, a WDM-2 preserved at DLW, Varanasi

India has 40 or more preserved locomotives.

- Fairy Queen (1855), formerly the oldest steam locomotive in regular service, located at National Rail Museum or at Rewari Railway Heritage Museum or put on occasional heritage runs
- Sir Leslie Wilson (1928), a WCG-1 electric locomotive which belonged to the Great Indian Peninsular Railway (presently Central Railway), a khaki which moaned. At National Rail Museum.
- Sir Roger Lumley (1930), a WCP-1 electric locomotive, at National Rail Museum
- Two more locomotives at National Rail Museum.
- At least two locomotives at Chennai Rail Museum, Chennai
- Three at Rail Museum, Howrah, Kolkata
- Nine at Railway Museum, Mysore, Mysore
- Ten others at Rewari Railway Heritage Museum, National Capital Region
- Eleven preserved WDM-2 locomotives at scattered other locations.

DHR 778 (1889), built in Glasgow, the only Darjeeling Himalayan Railway locomotive now located outside India, is now preserved in Oxfordshire, England.

=== in United Kingdom ===
With some overlap between sublists, preserved locomotives in the UK include:

- More than 100 preserved British industrial steam locomotives, not including fireless ones
- About 30 preserved fireless steam locomotives in Britain

==== Preserved locomotives of heritage railway in England ====
- Steam locomotives and diesel locomotives of the Bluebell Railway
- Steam locomotives, diesel locomotives, and multiple units of the Bodmin and Wenford Railway
- Great Central Railway locomotives
- Heritage Shunters Trust
- Isle of Wight Steam Railway

== See also ==
- From Category:Railway museums in Canada:
  - Toronto Railway Museum
  - Canadian Railway Museum
  - Winnipeg Railway Museum
  - Prairie Dog Central Railway [Doncram note: all 3 locomotives mentioned in its Wikipedia article are table-ized above]
