= China Railways GJ =

Class of Chinese steam locomotives

GJ 工建
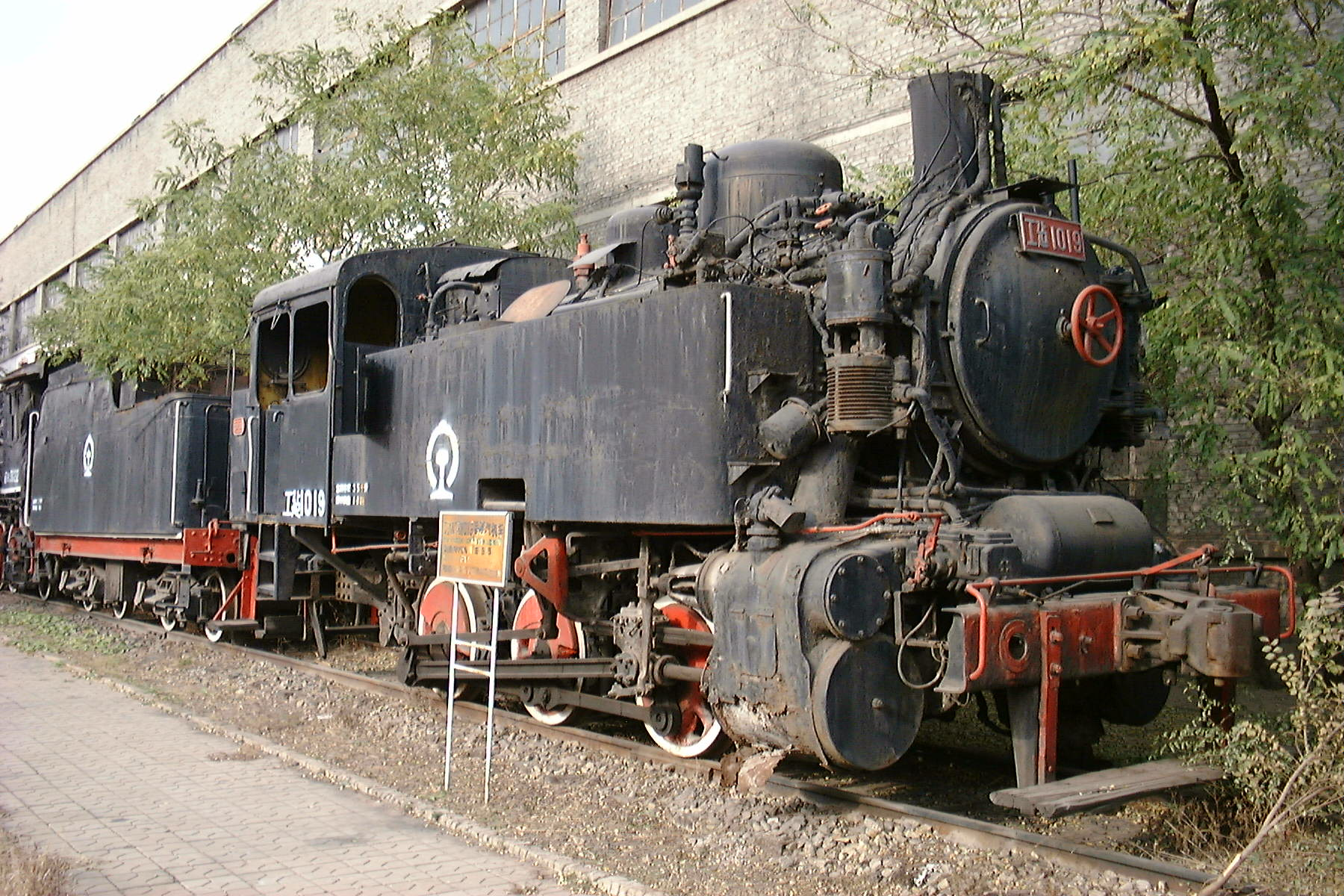
- GJ-1019 at Datong Railway Museum
Type and origin
- Power type: Steam
- Designer: Dalian locomotive works
- Builder: Chengdu locomotives works; Taiyuan locomotive works
- Build date: 1958–1961
- Total produced: 122
Specifications
- Configuration
  - Whyte: 0-6-0T
- Gauge: 1,435 mm (4 ft 8 1/2 in)
- Driver dia.: 1,000 mm (39.37 in)
- Fuel type: Coal
- Cylinders: Two, outside
- Cylinder size: 480 mm × 550 mm (18.898 in × 21.654 in) bore x stroke
- Valve gear: Walschaerts
Performance figures
- Maximum speed: 40 mph (64 km/h)
Career
- Operators: China Railway; Korean State Railway; Thai Nguyen Steel Works
- Delivered: 1958
- First run: 1958
- Last run: 2000s
- Retired: 2000s
- Preserved: 5
- Disposition: 5 preserved, remainder scrapped

The China Railways GJ (Chinese: 工建; pinyin: Gōng jiàn; lit. 'construction worker') locomotives were a class of 122 0-6-0T "Switcher" type steam locomotives built for industrial and shunting uses.

== History ==
These locomotives were designed at the Dalian locomotive works and built at the Taiyun and Chengdu works between 1958 and 1961. Many were used at steel works, others were used as pilot locomotives at railway factories. Some units remained in use until the 2000s.

In July 1959, seven class GJ locomotives were sent from the Chengdu Works to the Korean State Railway of North Korea.

== Preservation ==
- GJ-1018 (Taiyuan version) is preserved in a park near Sujiatun Locomotive Works.
- GJ-1019 (Taiyuan version) is part of the Beijing Railway Museum collection.
- GJ-1038 is preserved in Shenyang Railway Museum.
- GJ-1045 is preserved in Jijie Railway Station, Gejiu, Yunan.
- GJ-1076 is preserved in Wafangdian, Liaoning by Fan Yongjun.

== In fiction ==
The Thomas & Friends character Hong-Mei is based on this locomotive.
