= China Railways KF =

Class of Chinese steam locomotives

Chinese Government Railways Class KF
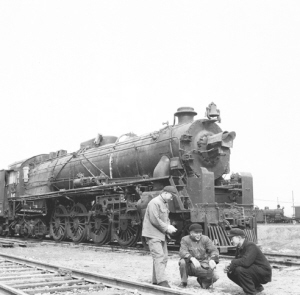
Type and origin
- Power type: Steam
- Designer: Colonel Kenneth Cantlie
- Builder: Vulcan Foundry
- Build date: 1935–1936
Specifications
- Configuration
  - Whyte: 4-8-4
- Gauge: 4 ft 8 1/2 in (1,435 mm)
- Leading dia.: 900 mm (35.43 in)
- Driver dia.: 1,750 mm (68.90 in)
- Trailing dia.: 1,050 mm (41.34 in)
- Length: 28.410 m (93 ft 3 in)
- Axle load: 14.96 tonnes (16½ tons)
- Adhesive weight: 67.96 tonnes (66.89 long tons; 74.91 short tons)
- Total weight: 259.5 tonnes (255.4 long tons; 286.0 short tons)
- Fuel type: Coal
- Firebox
  - Grate area: 394.64 m^{2} (4,247.9 sq ft)
- Boiler pressure: 15.5 kgf/cm^{2} (1.52 MPa; 220 psi)
- Cylinders: Two, outside
- Cylinder size: 540 x 750 mm (21¼ x 28½ in)
Performance figures
- Maximum speed: 120 km/h (75 mph)
- Tractive effort: 160.5 kN (36,100 lb)
Career
- Operators: Ministry of Railways, Guangzhou-Hankou Railway (1935–1948); China Railway (1950–1974)
- Numbers: 600–623 (Chinese Ministry of Railways); 1-17 (China Railway)
- Locale: China
- Delivered: 1935–1936
- Retired: 1977
- Preserved: 2
- Disposition: 7 destroyed, 2 preserved, remainder scrapped

The Class KF (聯盟型, 'Confederation class', re-designated "ㄎㄈ" or "KF") are a type of 4-8-4 "Northern" type steam locomotives, built in the United Kingdom by the Vulcan Foundry for the railways of China. Between 1935 and 1936, 24 locomotives were built for the Guangzhou–Hankou Railway, designated as the 600 series. Following World War II, and the establishment of the People's Republic of China, the Chinese Government assumed control of the railway and re-designated the engines in 1954 as the "ㄎㄈ" class ("ㄎㄈ" being the Zhuyin characters for "K(o)-F(o)") from the first two syllables of "Confederation", and in 1959 as the "KF" class.

== History ==
In July 1933, the Guangdong–Hankou Railway was in need of new motive power for their being finished Guangzhou to Shaoguan line (capital of Guangdong Province to the northern border of the province). However, this particular line had been burdened with gradients of around two percent as well as curves with less than 250 m (0.16 mi) radii, and low capacity bridges. This necessitated a locomotive design that had more tractive effort while retaining a low axle load. The Ministry of Railways approached the Vulcan Foundry in Britain, who devised a series of locomotives of a 4-8-4 wheel arrangement. 24 were ordered in 1935 and delivered to China in 1935-36. Under the Nationalist Government, the engines were numbered 600-623.

Although designed by an Englishman, Col. Kenneth Cantlie, and built by an English firm, the class followed American design paradigms, featuring an automatic stoker, and a 4-8-4 configuration never used in the United Kingdom. One exception was the low axle load of 16½ tons.

The engines were a significant improvement over previous designs, incorporating a more efficient E-type superheater and duplex steam valve to allow better steaming without enlarging the boiler. The 4-8-4 wheel arrangement allowed for better weight distribution as well as improved handling on sharp curves .When the Changsha-Canton Railway was completed in October 1936, locomotives 600-623 were transferred to operate over northern section between Hankou and Changsha on this new main line. During World War II the locomotives were transferred to Guangxi Province through Hunan–Guangxi Railway, away from Japanese-occupied territory.

Out of 24 engines built, 17 survived the Second Sino-Japanese war. After the establishment of the People's Republic in 1949, the locomotives were repaired, upgraded, and reassigned the numbers 1-17 for use on the Shanghai–Nanjing Railway. They retained their old classification KF and continued in service up to early 1977. Builder details:

- KF 1-16 2D2-h2 520x725 1752 Vulcan Foundry 4668 - 4683 / 1935 Renumbered to 'KF' 601 - 616
- KF 17-24 2D2-h2 520x725 1752 Vulcan Foundry 4696 - 4703 / 1936 Renumbered to 'KF' 617 - 624

== Preservation ==
Two examples are known to have been preserved. One KF7 was presented by the Chinese Government to the National Railway Museum, England in 1981. Another KF class locomotive is preserved at the China Railway Museum, China.

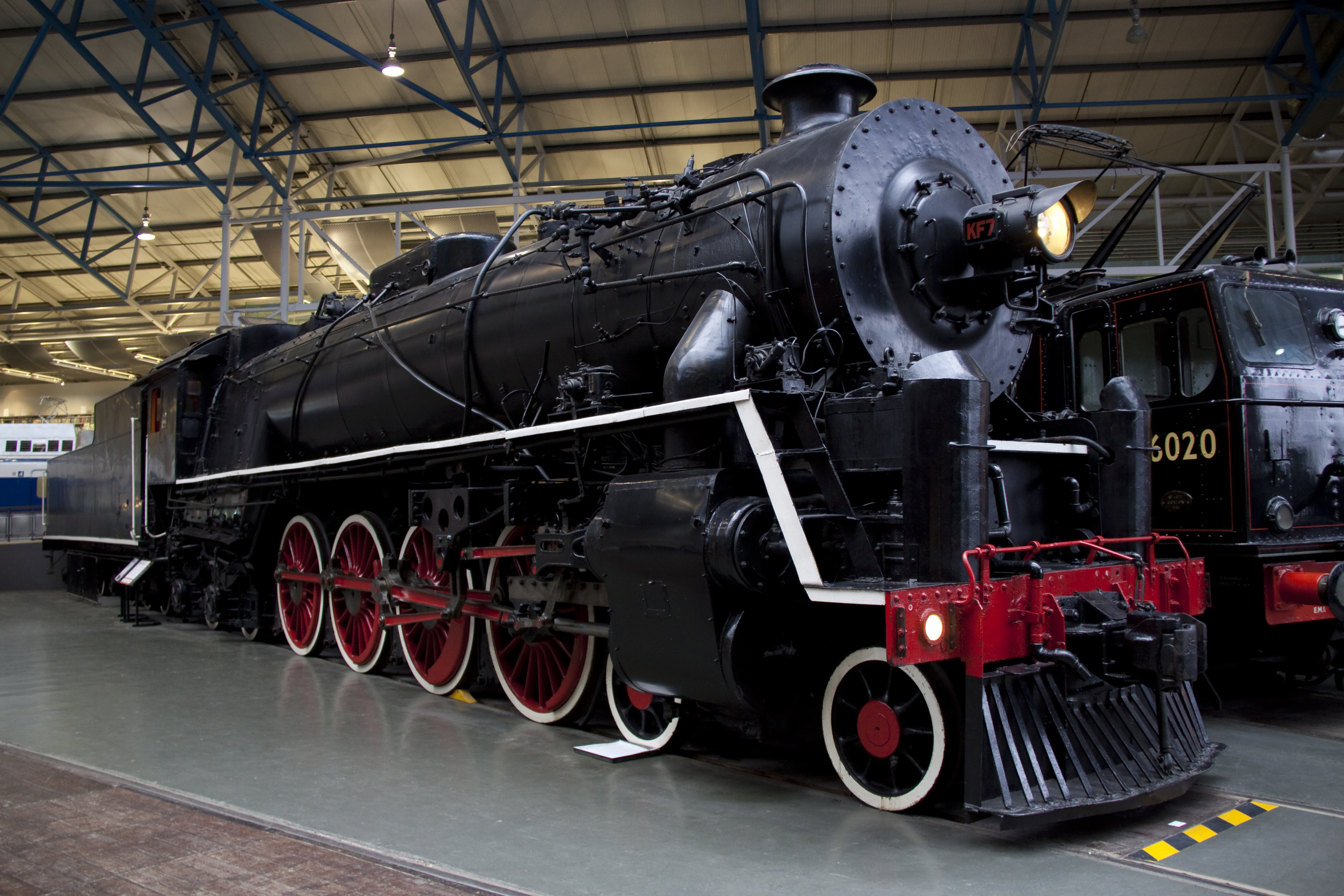
KF7-607 at the National Railway Museum in York

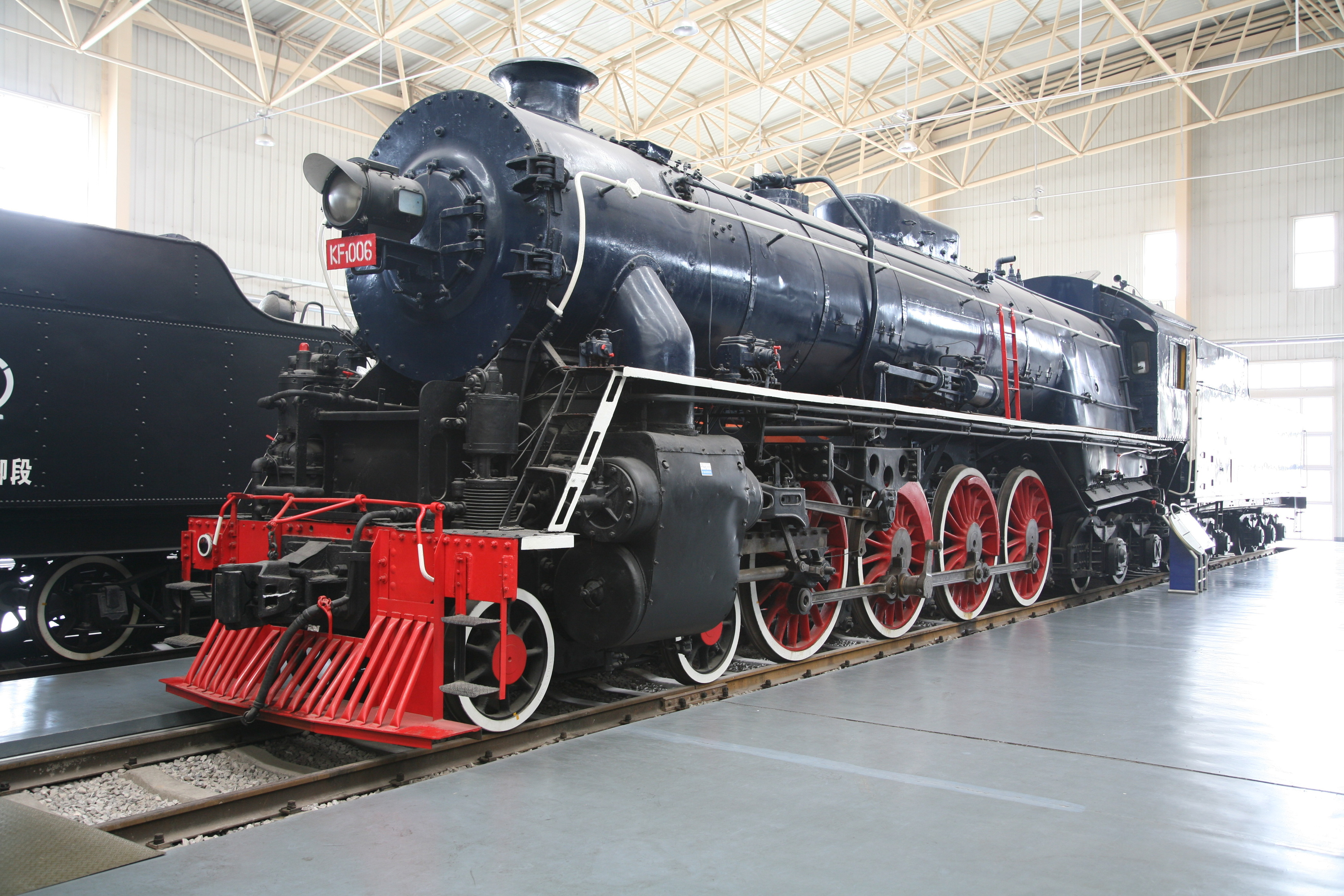
KF1-006 at the China Railway Museum in Beijing
