= China Railway Museum =

Railway museum in Beijing

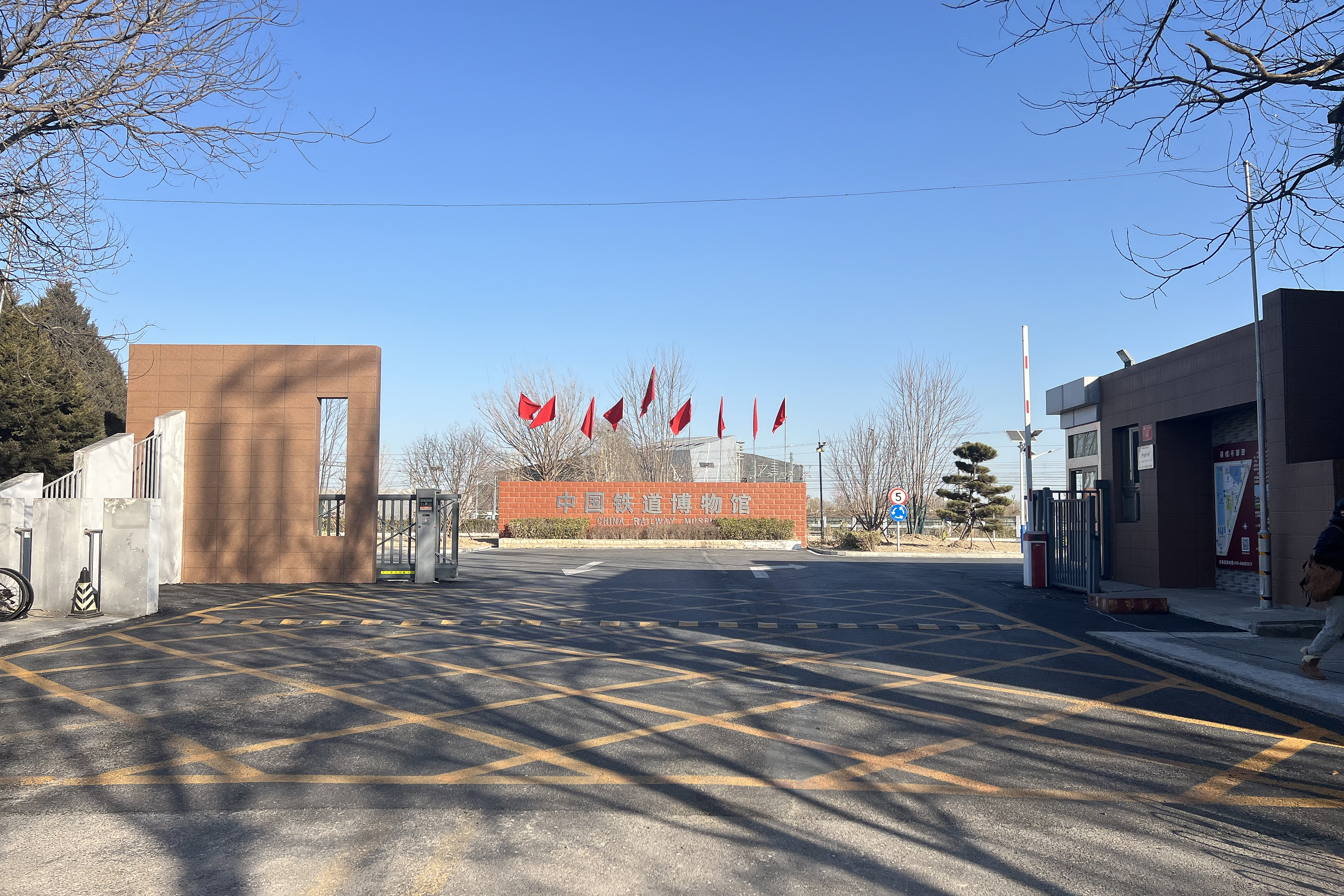
- Established: 2002
- Location: Beijing, PRC
- Coordinates: 39°59′47″N 116°30′37″E
- Type: Railway museum
- Website: Official website

The China Railway Museum (simplified Chinese: 中国铁道博物馆; traditional Chinese: 中國鐵道博物館; pinyin: Zhōngguó Tiědào Bówùguǎn) is a Chinese museum preserving locomotives that have operated on the railways of the People's Republic of China. The museum offers a total exhibition space of 16,500 square metres (178,000 sq ft) and eight exhibition tracks.

The museum is located in Chaoyang District of Beijing, some 15 kilometres (9 mi) northeast of downtown Beijing, inside the circular test track that is part of the China National Railway Test Centre. It also has a branch in downtown Beijing, in the former Zhengyangmen East Railway Station near Tian'anmen Square.

== History ==
The China Railway Museum has its origins in the 1950s when the Ministry of Railways (MOR) created a temporary exhibit for the Economic Achievements Exhibition in Beijing. This exhibition, which was held by the National Economic Development Committee, celebrated the 10th anniversary of the establishment of the People's Republic of China.

The MOR then founded the Central Technical Library in 1958 to promote scientific and technological advancements and support the growth of the Chinese railway industry. This institution subsequently became the MOR Exhibition Group, then the MOR Exhibition Department, and finally the MOR Science and Technology Museum.

On 2 November 2002, the MOR Science and Technology Museum's locomotive exhibition hall was opened to the public and was officially renamed the China Railway Museum on 1 September 2003.

The museum expanded further in October 2009 when the Beijing Railway Museum was integrated into the China Railway Museum.

== Downtown branch ==
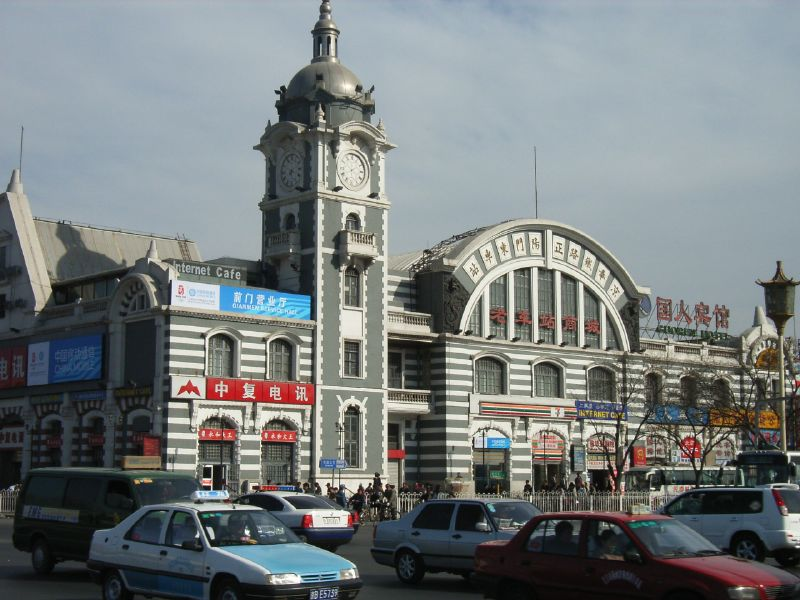
Zhengyangmen East Railway Station, now a branch of the museum

The Beijing Railway Museum (Chinese: 北京铁路博物馆; pinyin: Běijīng Tiělù Bówùguǎn) was opened in 2008 in a building which includes the clock-tower of the former Zhengyangmen East Railway Station of the Jingfeng Railway (Chinese: 京奉铁路正阳门东车站; pinyin: Jīngfèng Tiělù Zhèngyáng Mén Dōng Chēzhàn), just southeast of the Tian'anmen Square. The rest of the building is entirely new-build, dating from the 1979 construction of Beijing Subway Line 4, which required the rest of the old station to be demolished. The historic facade was then reconstructed, in mirror-image, on the opposite (right hand) side of the clock tower. In October 2009, Beijing Railway Museum was renamed to the Zhengyangmen Branch (正阳门馆) of the China Railway Museum. This part of the museum contains only one full size historic locomotive - an 0-6-0 tank engine from the 19th century. The rest of the displays comprise models, maps (some in 3D relief), photographs, documents and displays about the development of railways in China, including architectural models of six new stations on the CRH China Railway High-speed system. Also on display is a CRH3 cab simulator.

== Locomotives ==
No.	Class/Type	Builder	Track Gauge	Wheel Configuration	Image
0004	QJ	Dalian Locomotive Works	1,435 mm (4 ft 8 1/2 in)	2-10-2	
1001	RM	CSR Sifang Co Ltd.	1,435 mm (4 ft 8 1/2 in)	4-6-2	
1019	GJ	Taiyuan Locomotive Works	1,435 mm (4 ft 8 1/2 in)	0-6-0T	
1979	FD	Voroshilovgrad; Locomotive Factory	1,435 mm (4 ft 8 1/2 in)	2-10-2	
5001	JS	Dalian Locomotive Works	1,435 mm (4 ft 8 1/2 in)	2-8-2	
373	KD5	Kawasaki	1,435 mm (4 ft 8 1/2 in)	2-8-0	
KF1 (Note: Chinese Government Railways KF1 was renumbered 006.)	KF1	Vulcan Foundry	1,435 mm (4 ft 8 1/2 in)	4-8-4	
035	MG1	North British Locomotive Company	1,435 mm (4 ft 8 1/2 in)	2-6-0	
0	0	Black, Hawthorn & Co	1,435 mm (4 ft 8 1/2 in)	0-4-0ST	
23	SN	Baldwin Locomotive Works	600 mm (1 ft 11 5/8 in)	0-10-0	
579	KD55	Kawasaki	1,000 mm (3 ft 3 3/8 in)	2-8-0	
738	JF51	France	1,000 mm (3 ft 3 3/8 in)	2-8-2ST	
4290	DFH1	CSR Sifang Co Ltd.	1,435 mm (4 ft 8 1/2 in)	B’B’	
0049	ND5 Type 1 (GE C36-7)	General Electric	1,435 mm (4 ft 8 1/2 in)	C’C’	

== Gallery ==
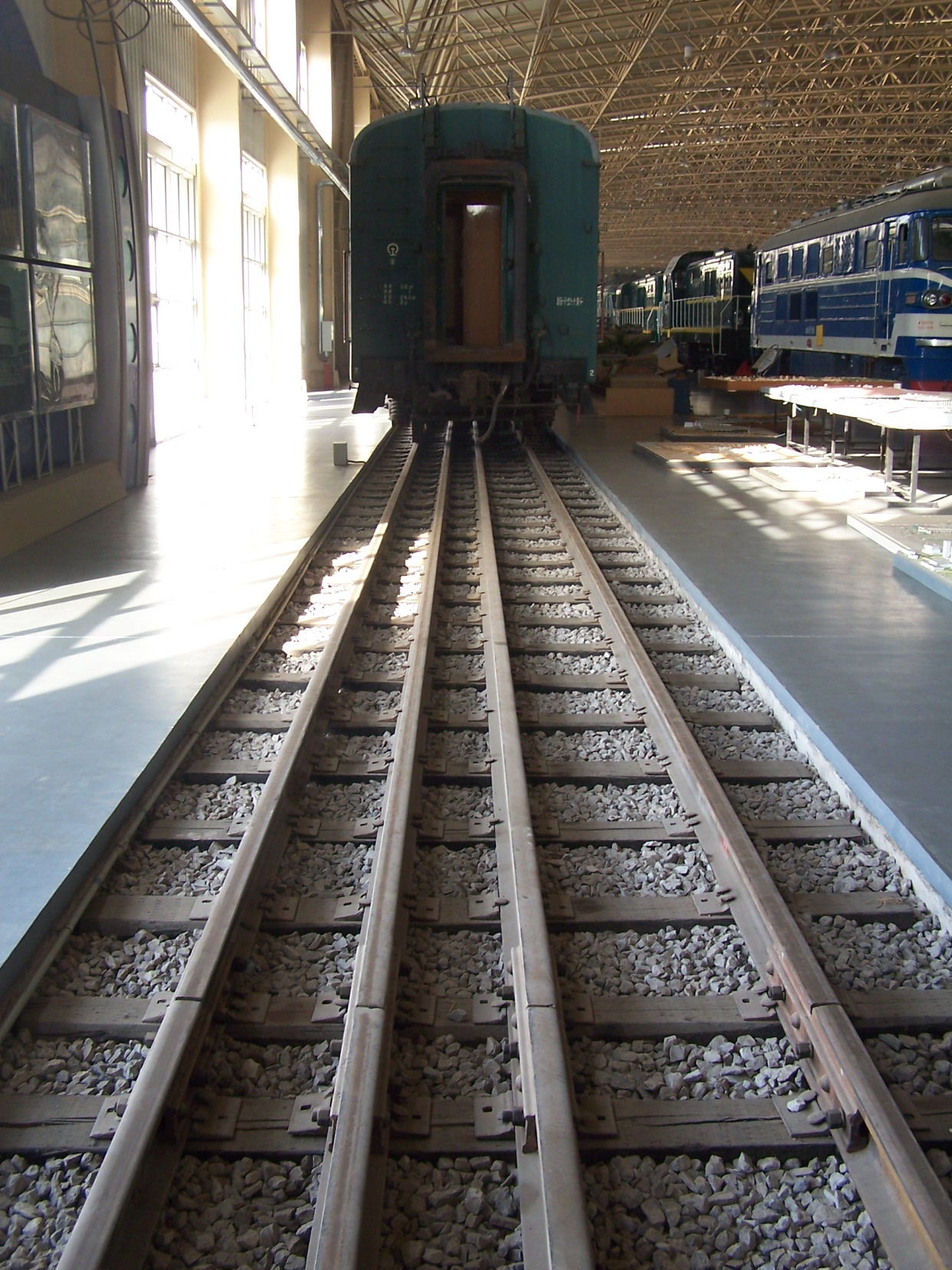
Triple gauge, from left:
•1,435 mm (4 ft 8 1/2 in),
•1,000 mm (3 ft 3 3/8 in), and
•600 mm (1 ft 11 5/8 in)

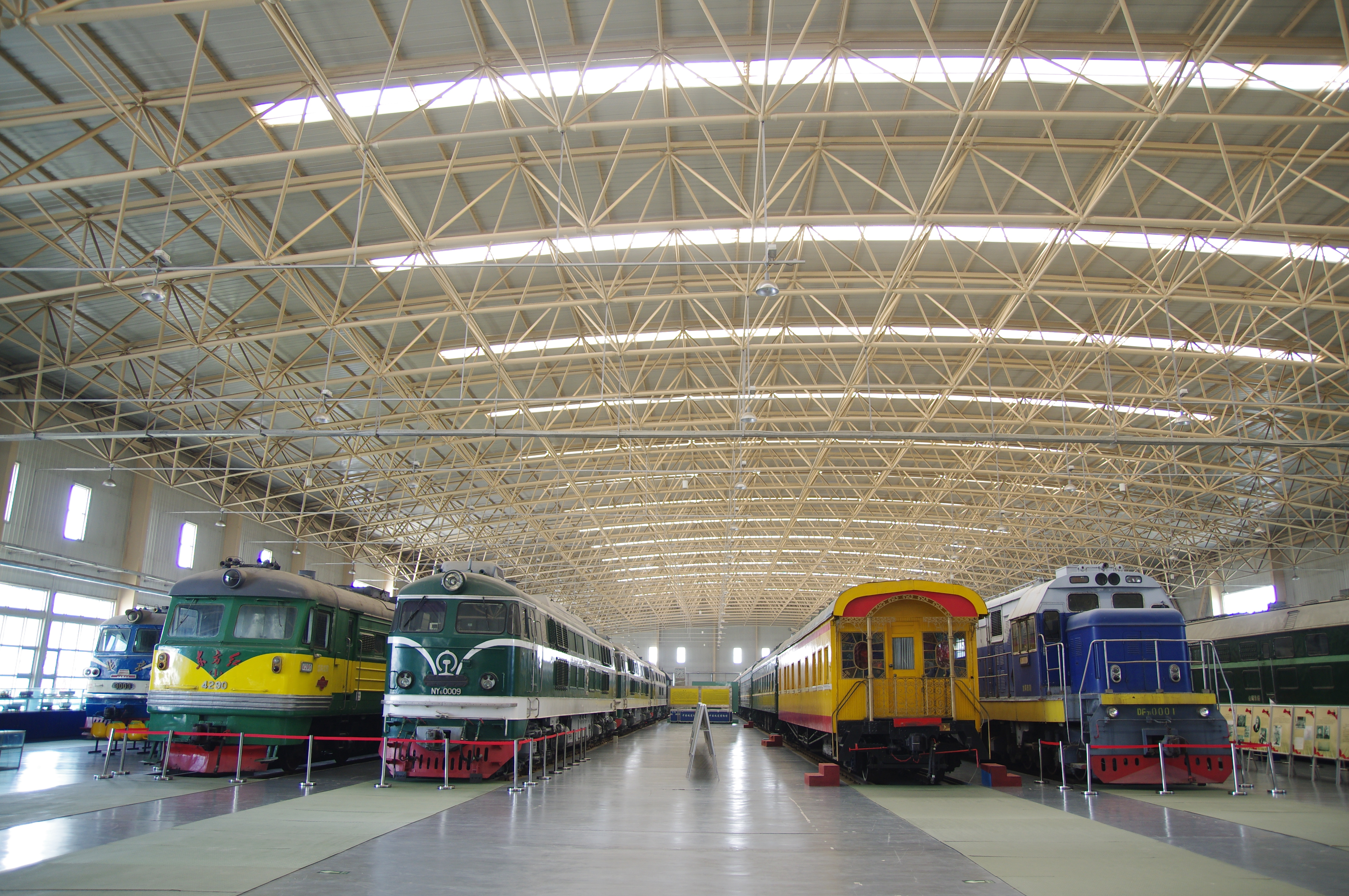
Panoramic view inside the museum

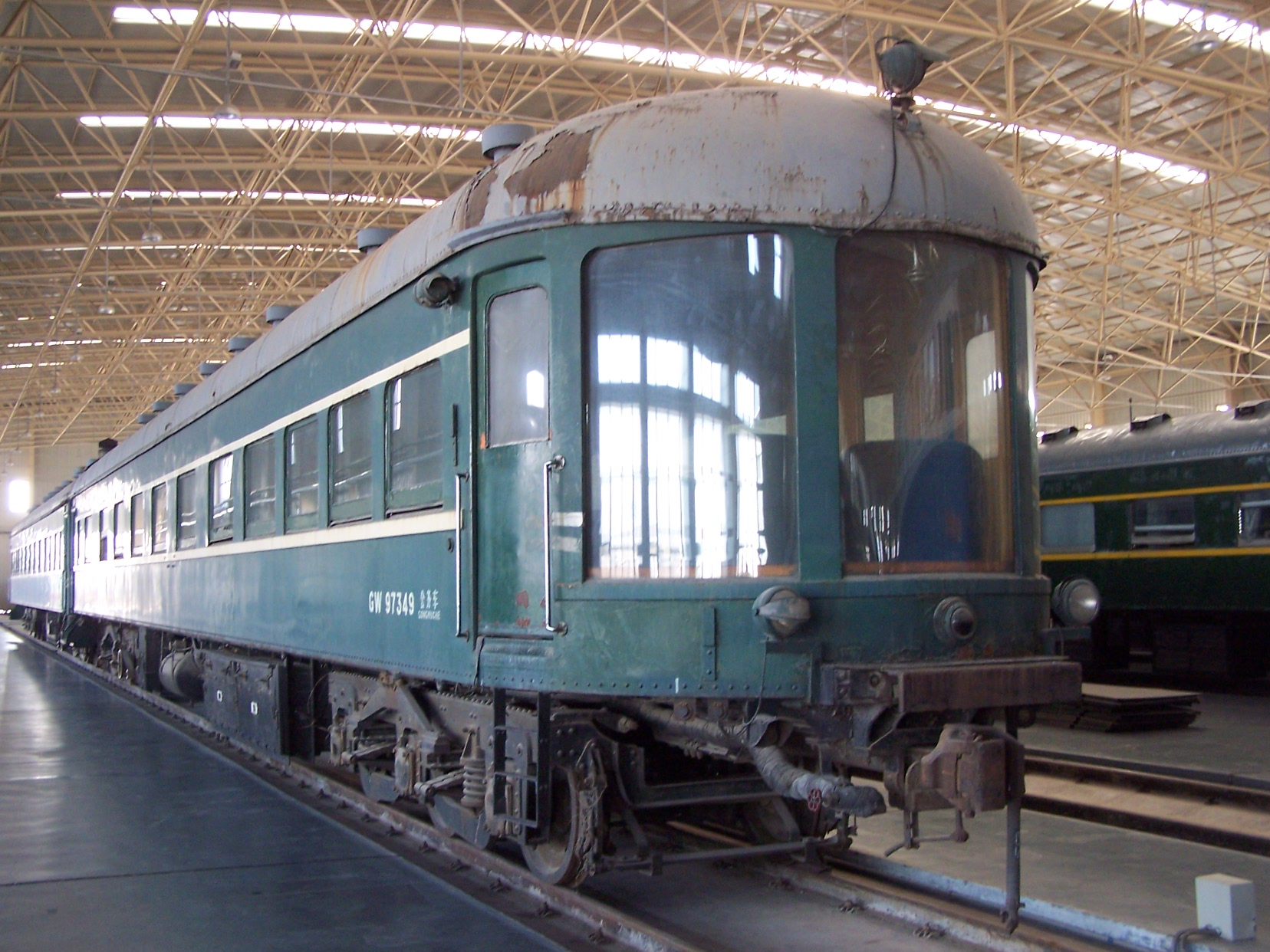
A Ten'ine2 type observation carriage

== See also ==
- List of museums in China
- Ministry of Railways of the People's Republic of China
