= China Railways SN =

Tender locomotive series

China Railways SN class
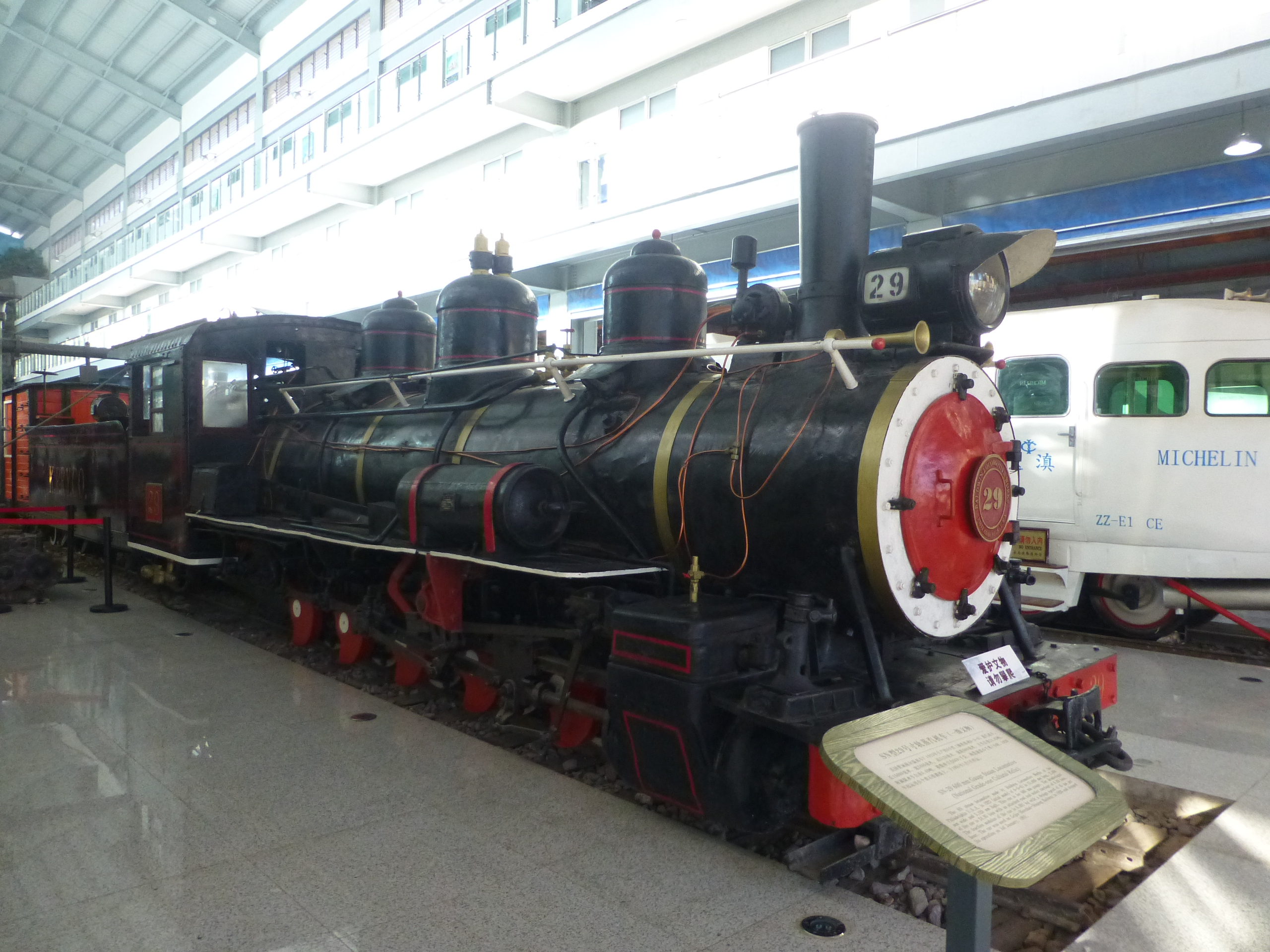
- SN class no. 29 on display at the Yunnan Railway Museum
Type and origin
- Power type: Steam
- Builder: Baldwin Locomotive Works
- Build date: 1924–1929
Specifications
- Configuration
  - Whyte: 0-10-0
  - UIC: E
- Gauge: 1 ft 11 5/8 in (600 mm)
- Driver dia.: 711 mm (27.992 in)
- Wheelbase: 10 ft 0 in (3.05 m)
- Length: 29 ft 8 in (9.04 m)
- Frame type: Bar frame, outside
- Loco weight: 85,500 lb (38,800 kg)
- Tender weight: 16.5 t (16,500 kg)
- Fuel type: Coal
- Fuel capacity: 1 short hundredweight (0.045 t; 0.045 long tons)
- Water cap.: 1,000 US gal (3,800 L; 830 imp gal)
- Boiler pressure: 180 lbf/in^{2} (13 kg/cm^{2}; 1,200 kPa)
- Cylinders: Two, outside
- Valve gear: Walschaerts
- Valve type: slide valve
Performance figures
- Tractive effort: 14,700 lb (6,667.81 kg)
Career
- Operators: Gebishi Railway; China Railway
- Class: SN
- Number in class: 16
- Numbers: 1–50
- Nicknames: Kun-rail-ten-wheeled
- Withdrawn: 1990
- Preserved: SN–23, SN–26, SN–29
- Disposition: Most scrapped, three preserved

The China Railways SN class was a series of 0-10-0 tender locomotives built by Baldwin Locomotive Works for the Gebishi Railway, transporting passengers and goods between Gejiu City and Shiping County. The locomotives served on this line until its closure in 1990.

At least three members of the class are known to be preserved. No.23 is currently displayed in the China Railway Museum, while No.26 is in the Shanghai Railway Museum, No.29 is in the Yunnan Railway Museum.

== Gallery ==
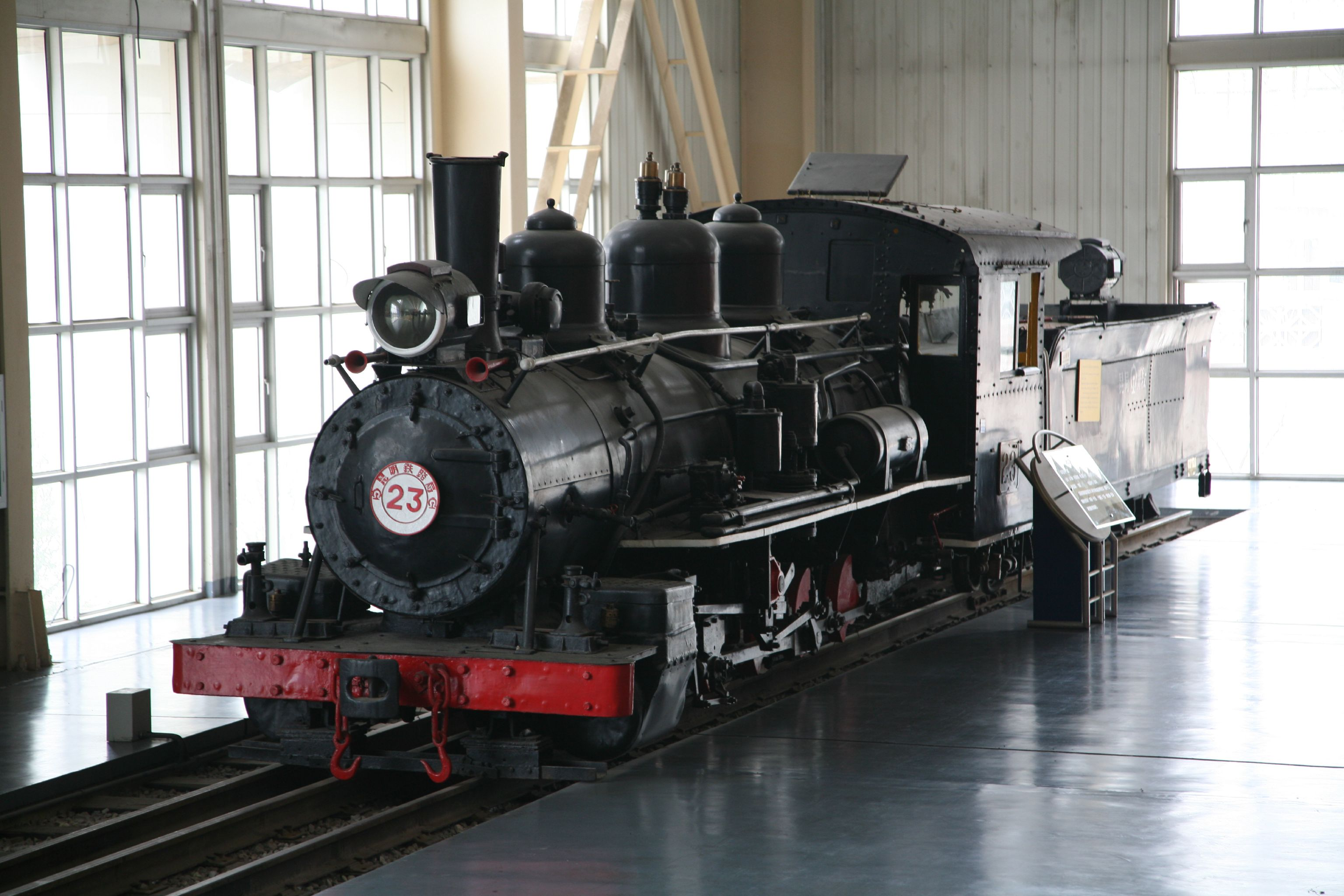
Display of SN-23

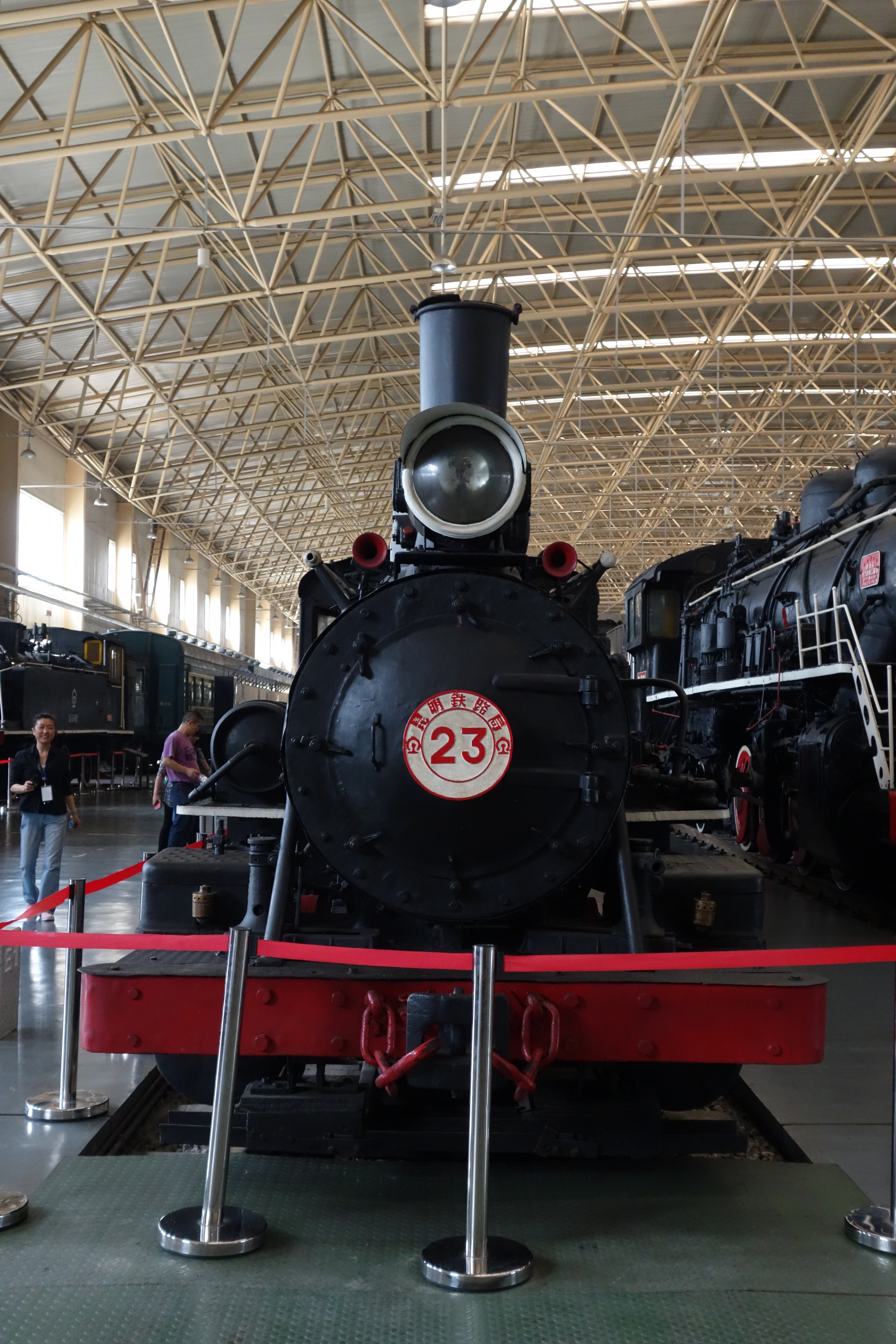
Positive face of SN-23

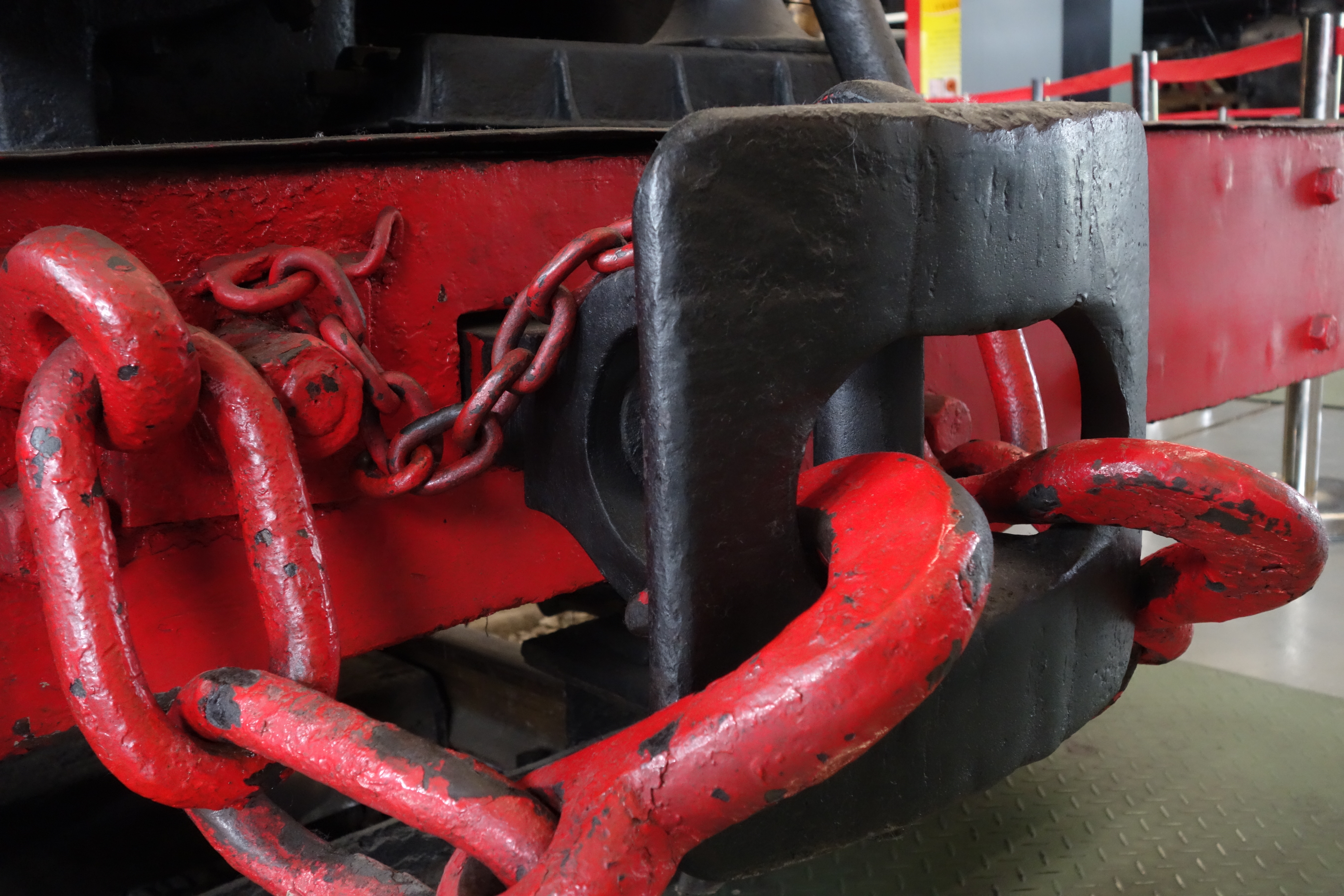
A Link and pin coupler of SN-23

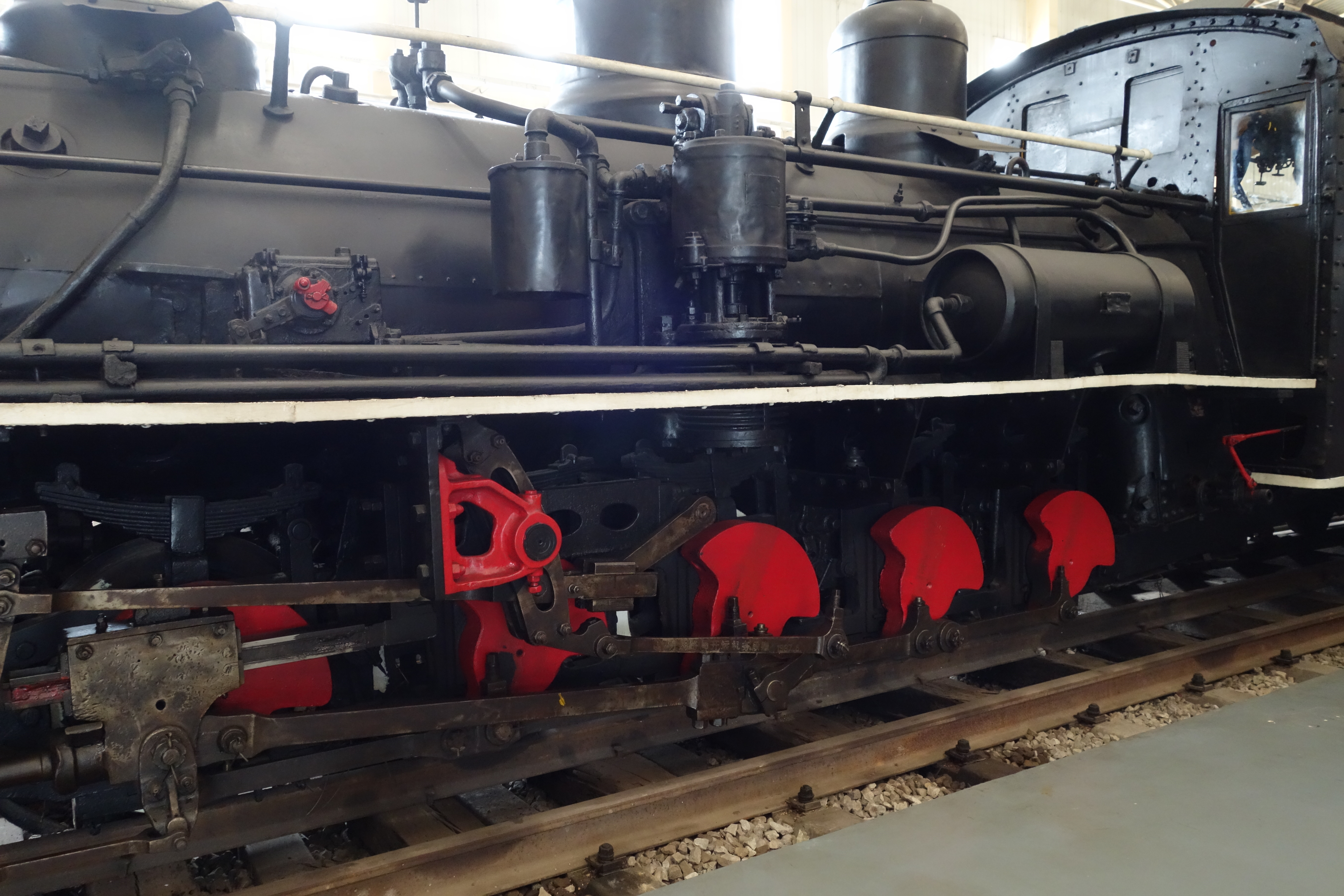
Driving wheel of SN-23

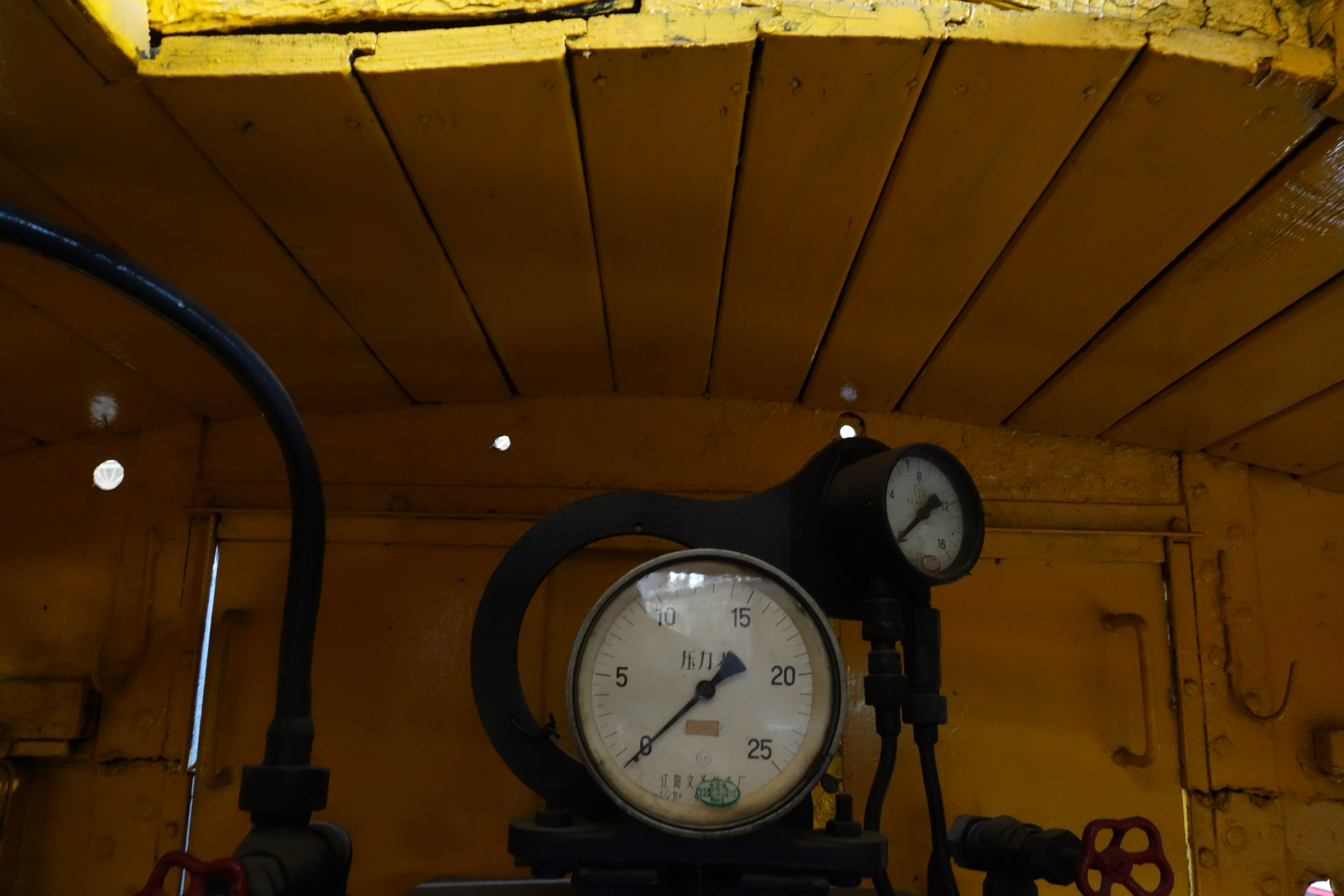
Pressure gauge of SN-23

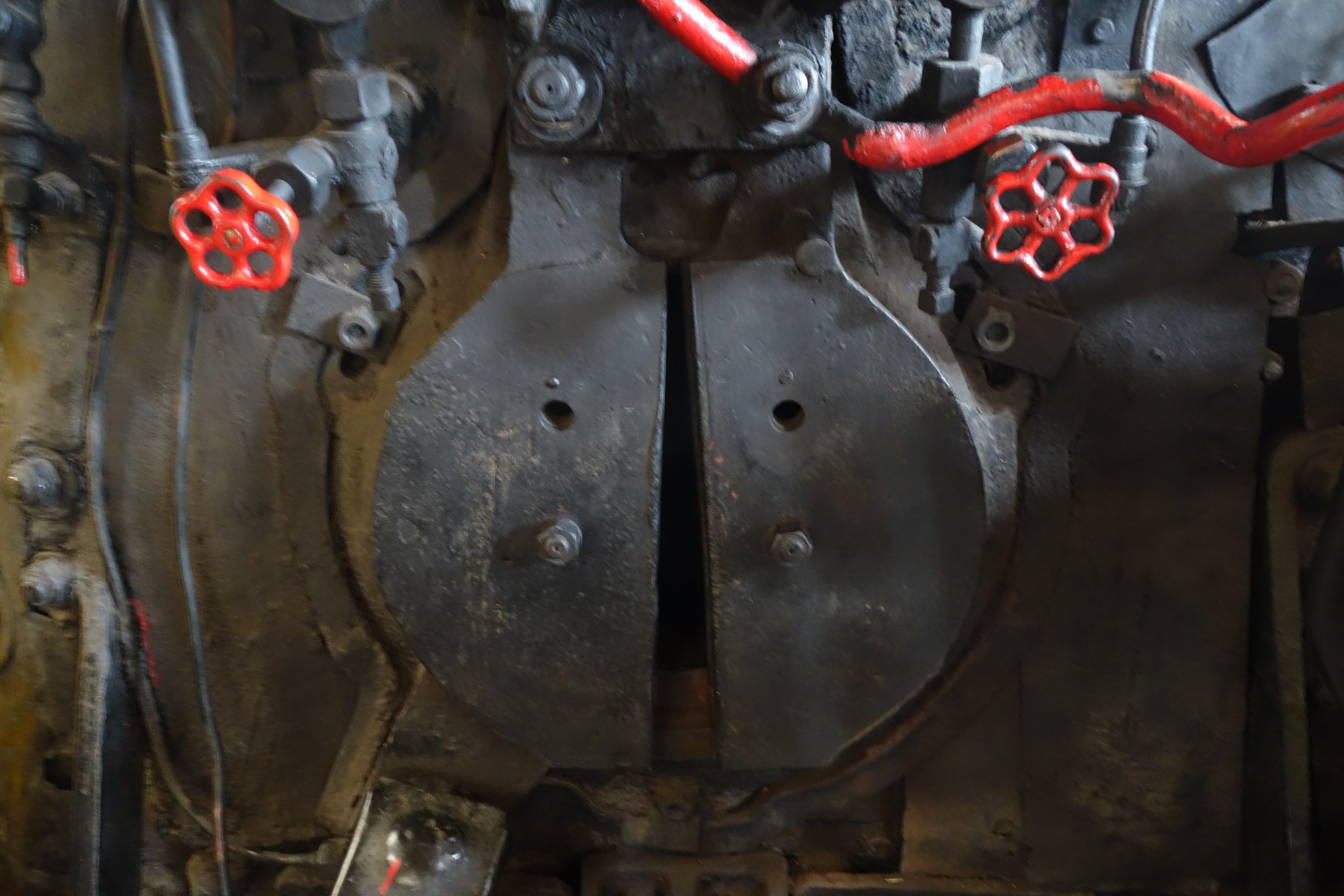
Firebox doors of SN-23

== See also ==
- Kunming–Hai Phong Railway
- Gebishi Railway
- DFH21
- KD55
