= Rolling stock of the Bodmin and Wenford Railway =

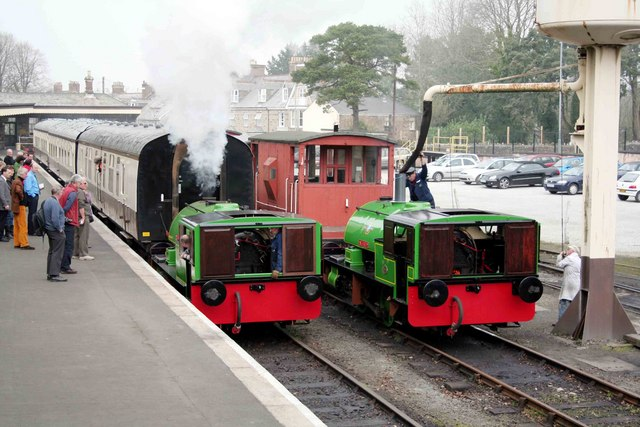
Alfred and Judy at Bodmin General with passenger coaches and heritage goods wagons

The rolling stock of the Bodmin and Wenford Railway are the locomotives, carriages and wagons used on the Bodmin and Wenford Railway, a heritage railway in Cornwall, England.

The Great Western Railway (GWR) opened a branch line from Bodmin Road to Bodmin General in 1887 and this was extended in 1888 to connect with the earlier Bodmin and Wadebridge Railway at Boscarne Junction. Passenger services ended early in 1967 and freight traffic ceased in 1983. The two sections of the line reopened as a heritage railway in 1990 and 1996 respectively.

The heritage railway's main depot is at Bodmin General and there is a carriage shed at Bodmin Parkway.

== Locomotives ==
Most of the locomotives operating on the Bodmin and Wenford Railway are Great Western Railway (GWR) steam locomotives and British Rail (BR) diesels typical of those that have operated in Cornwall and west Devon, along with shunting locomotives typical of industrial and military sites in the area.

=== Steam locomotives ===
Number & name	Wheels	Class	Built	To B&WR	Notes	Image
4612	0-6-0PT	GWR 5700	1942	2001	An example of the GWR's most numerous class of 'Pannier tanks', 4612 was withdrawn in 1965 and sold to the Woodham Brothers for scrap. It was sold to provide spare parts for another preserved locomotive but was eventually sold to the Bodmin Railway Trust and restored. It is currently (2025) out of service and awaiting overhaul.	
5552	2-6-2T	GWR 4575	1928	1986	This 'Prairie tank' was withdrawn from Truro shed in 1961. The Bodmin Railway Trust rescued it from Woodham's scrapyard in Barry in 1986 and it was returned to steam in 2003.	
30587	2-4-0WT	LSWR 0298	1874	2023	A 'Beattie Well Tank', one of three that were used for many years on the mineral branch from Boscarne Junction to Wenfordbridge. It is part of the National Collection. It worked at Bodmin from 2002 until 2017. It returned in 2023 for static display.	
75178	0-6-0ST	Austerity	1944	1997	Bagnall's works number 2766 was one of many locomotives built to Hunslet's 'Austerity' design during World War II. It worked in Antwerp before being sold to the National Coal Board in 1947 for use at Treorchy and, from 1970, at Maesteg. It was withdrawn in 1973. and restoration started before it came to Bodmin where it eventually returned to steam in 2017, painted in War Department green. It is currently (2025) out of service for an overhaul.	
Alfred	0-4-0ST	Port of Par	1953	1987	Alfred (Bagnall works number 3058) was the last of the locomotives specially constructed to go under a low bridge at the Port of Par that had to be negotiated to reach clay driers at Par Moor. It was withdrawn in 1977 and preserved by the Cornish Steam Locomotive Preservation Society. It is currently (2025) out of service awaiting an overhaul.	
Judy	0-4-0ST	Port of Par	1937	2003	Judy was the first of Bagnall's special saddle tanks for the Port of Par was works number 2572. It was withdrawn in 1969 but kept at Par for several years until it was donated to the china clay museum at Wheal Martyn. In 2004 it joined Alfred in the care of the Cornish Steam Locomotive Preservation Society. It was successfully steamed on 31 October 2008.	

=== Diesel locomotives ===
Number & name	Class	Built	To B&WR	Notes	Image
D3452	Class 10	1957	1989	After withdrawal by British Rail this shunting locomotive was sold to English China Clays plc in September 1968 to work at Fowey. After 23 years shunting wagons of china clay it was preserved, arriving at Bodmin on 5 March 1989. The locomotive is currently (2023) painted in British Rail black livery but is out of service awaiting an overhaul.	
08444	Class 08	1958	1987	One of the many Class 08 locomotives sold by British Rail, 08444 was bought by the Bodmin Railway Trust and arrived on 27 March 1987. It carries BR green livery but is currently (2025) being overhauled.	
37142	Class 37	1963	2003	37142 was the first Class 37 to be work in Cornwall. It was bought from the Harry Needle Railroad Company by one of the members of the Bodmin Heritage Diesels group. It was stopped for an overhaul in 2019 and has not yet (2023) returned to service.	
47306 The Sapper	Class 47	1964	2007	47306 was regarded as a heritage locomotive by English, Welsh and Scottish Railway and painted in the short-lived BR Railfreight Distribution livery. It came to Cornwall for a gala on the B&WR in 2002 and was then stored at St Blazey. It was preserved back at Bodmin in March 2007 and restored to operational condition.	
50042 Triumph	Class 50	1968	1991	50042 was withdrawn from service at Laira depot at Plymouth in 1990 and restored at Bodmin, entering service in 1993. It is painted in the BR large logo blue livery with a black roof.	
P403D Denise	Sentinel	1960	2014	Sentinel works number 10029 operated by for British Steel until 1970 when it was sold to English China Clay and shunted wagons at Rocks Drier near Bugle. It was number P403D in their fleet and given the name Denise. It was donated in 2014 to the Bodmin and Wenford Railway and entered service after a two-year restoration.	

== Diesel Multiple Units ==
Number	Class	Type	Built	To B&WR	Notes	Image
55020	121	DMBS	1960	2017	This single-car unit was painted in chocolate and cream livery for the GWR 150 celebrations in 1985. From 2002 until 2017 it was operated by Chiltern Railways and still carries that company's blue livery.	
59003	116	TS	1957	2024	The centre coach from a three-car unit. Preserved on the Dartmouth Steam Railway from 1984 until 2024 where it was named Zoe.	

== Coaching stock ==
Trains on the Bodmin and Wenford Railway are mostly formed from British Rail (BR) Mark 1 coaches but some GWR are also in use.

Number	Company	Type	Built	Notes	Image
232	GWR	Autocoach	1951	Built by BR to a GWR Hawksworth design. Used as an inspection saloon on the Dartmouth Steam Railway. Arrived at Bodmin in 2008 and fully restored, entering service in 2011.	
248	GWR	SAL	1881	First class family saloon, believed to be the oldest surviving GWR bogie coach.	
392	SR	B	1938		
1873	BR	RMB	1962		
3960	BR	TSO	1955	Moved to Bodmin in 2022 from Gloucestershire Warwickshire Railway.	
4037	BR	TSO	1956	Moved to Bodmin in 2016 from East Somerset Railway.	
4656	BR	TSO	1957		
4789	BR	SO	1957	At the Llangollen Railway from 1991 until 2002. Used in the B&WR dining train, named St Petroc.	
4963	BR	TSO	1962		
9214	BR	BSO	1955	Converted by BR for use in a rerailing train. Now used by B&WR permanent way team.	
10618	BR	SLEP	1983	Mark 3a sleeper sold to the Bodmin and Wenford Railway in 1994.	
25807	BR	SK	1961	At the Llangollen Railway from 1990 until 2010.	
35130	BR	BSK	1957		
80702	BR	BG	1955	Brake van for the B&WR dining train, named St Pinnock.	
94257	BR	CCT	1959		
94732	BR	CCT	1961		

== Goods wagons ==
Heritage goods wagons on the Bodmin and Wenford Railway include several examples of open wagons that had been built by British Rail (BR) to carry china clay in Cornwall. Other wagons are used to maintain the railway and its equipment.

Number	Company	Type	Built	Notes	Image
2506	PO	Tank	1932	SA milk tank owned by United Dairies and operated on a GWR six-wheel chassis.	
5108	PO	Open	1963	A steel open registered by the Army to operate on the main line until 1981 and then used internally at Marchwood Military Port.	
5442	PO	Tank	1944	A Class A tank wagon for aviation spirit (fuel oil), registered by Shell-Mex BP with the London, Midland and Scottish Railway.	
34620	BR	Bogie flat	1955	British Rail Mark 1 coach underframe now used as a flat-bed wagon.	
35302	GWR	Brake van	1946	Telegraphic code: Toad.	
41799	GWR	Shunters truck	1902	Telegraphic code: Chariot.	
103999	GWR	Van	1923	Telegraphic code: Mink A.	
104663	GWR	Van	1924	Telegraphic code: Mink.	
222814	LNER	Van	1938	Non-ventilated London and North Eastern Railway fruit van.	
261052	LNER	Van	1943	London and North Eastern Railway van.	
301568	LNER	Open	1947	Long wheelbase open wagon, telegraphic code: Tube.	
375050	BR	Hopper	1987	Air-braked china clay hopper.	
375061	BR	Hopper	1987	Air-braked china clay hopper.	
375063	BR	Hopper	1987	Air-braked china clay hopper.	
375067	BR	Hopper	1987	Air-braked china clay hopper.	
375090	BR	Hopper	1988	Air-braked china clay hopper.	
375091	BR	Hopper	1988	Air-braked china clay hopper.	
375113	BR	Hopper	1988	Air-braked china clay hopper.	
375117	BR	Hopper	1988	Air-braked china clay hopper.	
489672	BR	Open	1954	Steel wagon, telegraphic code: Hyfit.	
700709	LMS	Machinery flat	1944	A London Midland and Scottish Railway machinery wagon, telegraphic code: Lowmac MO.	
743031	BR	Open	1955	End-tipping china clay wagon.	
743171	BR	Open	1955	End-tipping china clay wagon.	
743226	BR	Open	1957	End-tipping china clay wagon.	
743353	BR	Open	1957	End-tipping china clay wagon.	
743415	BR	Open	1959	End-tipping china clay wagon.	
743443	BR	Open	1959	End-tipping china clay wagon.	
743495	BR	Open	1959	End-tipping china clay wagon.	
743535	BR	Open	1959	End-tipping china clay wagon.	
743823	BR	Open	1960	End-tipping china clay wagon.	
904546	BR	Machinery flat	1952	A British Rail machinery wagon, telegraphic code: Lowmac WP.	
952045	BR	Brake van	1953	A standard British Rail goods brake van.	
955166	BR	Brake van	1961	A standard British Rail goods brake van.	
983622	BR	Ballast hopper	1960	Telegraphic code: Dogfish.	
993895	BR	Ballast plough	1957	A brake and staff van for ballast trains, telegraphic code: Shark.	
None	BR	Bogie flat	Unknown	Crane runner, original number unknown.	
None	BR	Flat	Unknown	The underframe from a ventilated van, number unknown.	
Camel	LSWR	Trolley	1875	A ganger's pump trolley dating from when the London and South Western Railway owned the Bodmin and Wadebridge line. It used to be kept in a shed at Dunmere Junction.	

== Past members of the B&WR fleet ==
These locomotives and multiple units have been based on the Bodmin and Wenford Railway in the past. These lists do not include locomotives based on other lines that were short term visitors, for example to a gala weekend or for a season.

=== Steam ===
Number & name	Wheels	Class	Built	On B&WR	Notes	Image
3802	2-8-0	GWR 2884	1938	1990-2002	This locomotive was being restored at Bodmin but it was moved to the Llangollen Railway before this was complete.	
4247	2-8-0T	GWR 4200	1916	2000s-2022	A heavy freight locomotive that used to haul trains of China clay from St Blazey to Fowey. In 2022 went to the East Somerset Railway for an overhaul and will be based on the Dartmouth Steam Railway from 2025.	
6435	0-6-0PT	GWR 6400	1937	2008-2024	Another 'pannier tank' engine, members of this class were fitted with equipment for working Auto trains. 6435 was withdrawn on 12 October 1964 and entered preservation with the Dart Valley Railway on 17 October 1965. It was transferred to the Torbay Steam Railway but proved too small and was sold to the Bodmin Railway Trust. It was withdrawn from service in 2021 and sold to the West Somerset Railway in 2024.	
30120	4-4-0	LSWR T9	1899	2008-2017	One of the LSWR's 'Greyhound' 4-4-0s that pulled express trains from Exeter to Wadebridge and Padstow. Part of the National Collection, it went to the Swanage Railway after being used at Bodmin.	
34007 Wadebridge	4-6-2	SR WC	1945	1990s-2007	This air-smoothed Southern Railway 'West Country' class locomotive came to Bodmin for restoration and was steamed in 2006 but then moved to the Mid Hants Railway.	
19	0-4-0ST	Bagnall	1950	1986–2024	This locomotive was built by W. G. Bagnall in 1950, their works number 2962. It was delivered to Devonport Dockyard, the last steam locomotive to enter service there before diesels started to arrive in 1955. It was sold to the Cornwall Steam Locomotive Preservation Society (CSLPS) and moved to their site at Bodmin in 1969. The CSLPS moved to Bugle in 1977 where number 19's restoration was completed. It returned to Bodmin and the B&WR in 1986. It was painted in Devonport Dockyard's plum colour.	
62 Ugly	0-6-0ST	RSH 56	1950	1990s-2000s	Robert Stephenson and Hawthorns works number 7673 was one of nine similar locomotives built for Stewarts & Lloyds. It was originally restored on the Keighley and Worth Valley Railway and acquired the nickname Ugly while on the Lavender Line. It worked at Bodmin for several years before moving to the Barry Tourist Railway but since 2008 has been based on the Spa Valley Railway.	
(1611)	0-4-0ST	Peckett W5	1923	1987-2009	This locomotive was donated to the Cornish Steam Locomotive Preservation Society by Albright & Wilson who had displayed it at their Portishead works since it was taken out of service. It was never restored before it was sold to the Swanage Railway but is now on display at Beal railway station.	
(3121)	0-4-0F	Bagnall	1957	1987-?	The last fireless locomotive built by W. G. Bagnall, it was used at the china clay works at Marsh Mills near Plymouth. It came to Bodmin with the other Cornish Steam Loocmotive Preservation Society locomotives but has since moved elsewhere.	

=== Diesel ===
Number	Class	Built	On B&WR	Notes	Image
20166	Class 20	1966	?-2007	Sold to Harry Needle in exchange for 47306. It carried the name River Fowey while at Bodmin.	
20197	Class 20	1967	?-2007	Brought to provide spare parts for 20166 and sold to Harry Needle with it.	
33110	Class 33	1960	1993-2020	This Southern Region locomotive arrived at Bodmin in December 1993. It was sold when 47306 became available for service.	
1 Peter	Fowler	1940	2009-c.2020	A John Fowler 0-4-0DM, works number 22928. It formerly worked for the North Devon Clay Company at Meeth.	
2 Progress	Fowler	1945	1980s-2008	A John Fowler 0-4-0DM, works number 400001. It formerly worked at Peters Marland Clay Company's site near Great Torrington.	
3 Lec	RH DS48	1960	2009-c.2020	A small 4-wheeled diesel that originally worked for LEC Refrigeration at Bognor Regis and was known as 'Lec' but while at Bodmin its name was changed to Brian. This was Ruston & Hornsby's works number 443642.	
50980 & 52054	Class 108	1959 & 1961	1993-2018	This two-car set operated services on the Bodmin & Wenford Railway but has been sold to the Weardale Railway.	
51947	Class 108	1961	1993-2021	This coach was never restored but was a source of spares for the 50980 and 52054. It was moved to the East Somerset Railway in 2021.	
53645	Class 108	1958	1993-1999	This coach was not restored before it was moved to the Nottingham Heritage Railway in 2021.	
