= Perranwell railway station =

Railway station in Cornwall, England

Perranwell Fentenberan
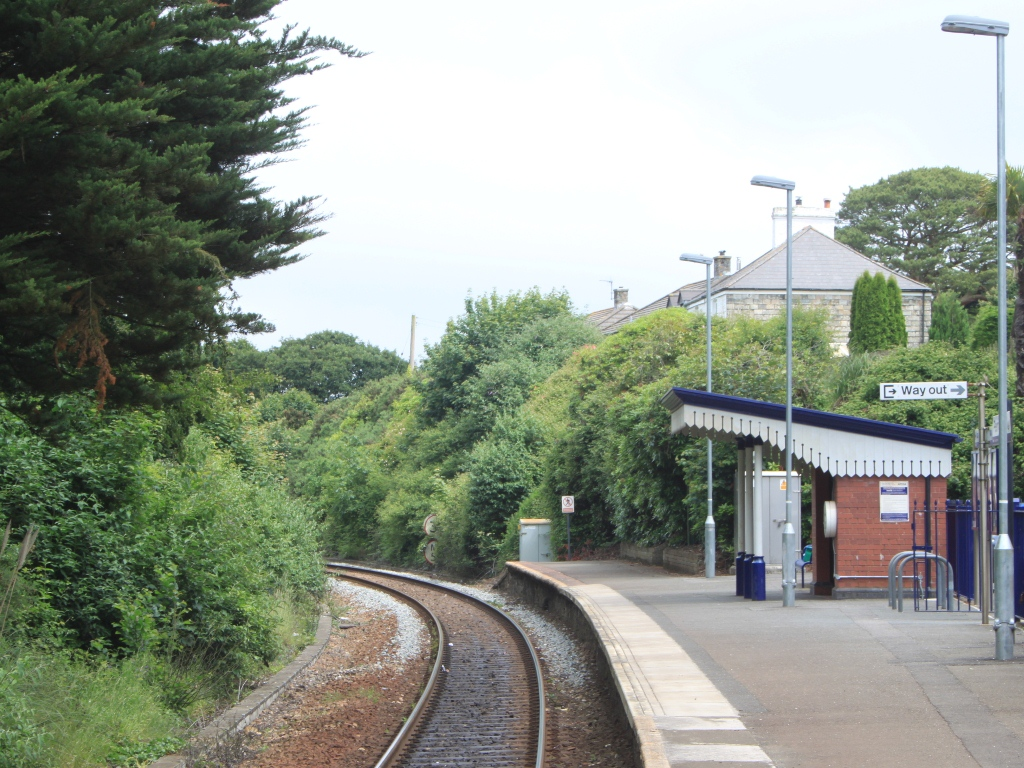
- Looking towards Truro in 2013

General information
- Location: Perranarworthal, Cornwall; England
- Coordinates: 50.217°N 5.112°W
- Grid reference: SW780398
- Manager: Great Western Railway
- Platforms: 1

Other information
- Station code: PRW
- Classification: DfT category F2

History
- Original company: Cornwall Railway
- Pre-grouping: Great Western Railway
- Post-grouping: Great Western Railway

Key dates
- Opened as 'Perran': 24 August 1863
- Renamed 'Perranwell': 19 February 1864

Passengers
- 2021–2022: ▲29,566
- 2022–2023: ▲31,926
- 2023–2024: ▲35,502
- 2024–2025: ▲41,538
- 2025–2026: ▲48,194
Location

Perranwell station (Cornish: Fentenberan) is on the Maritime Line between Truro and Penryn in Cornwall, England. It is at milepost 305 from London Paddington. Trains are operated by Great Western Railway.

== History ==
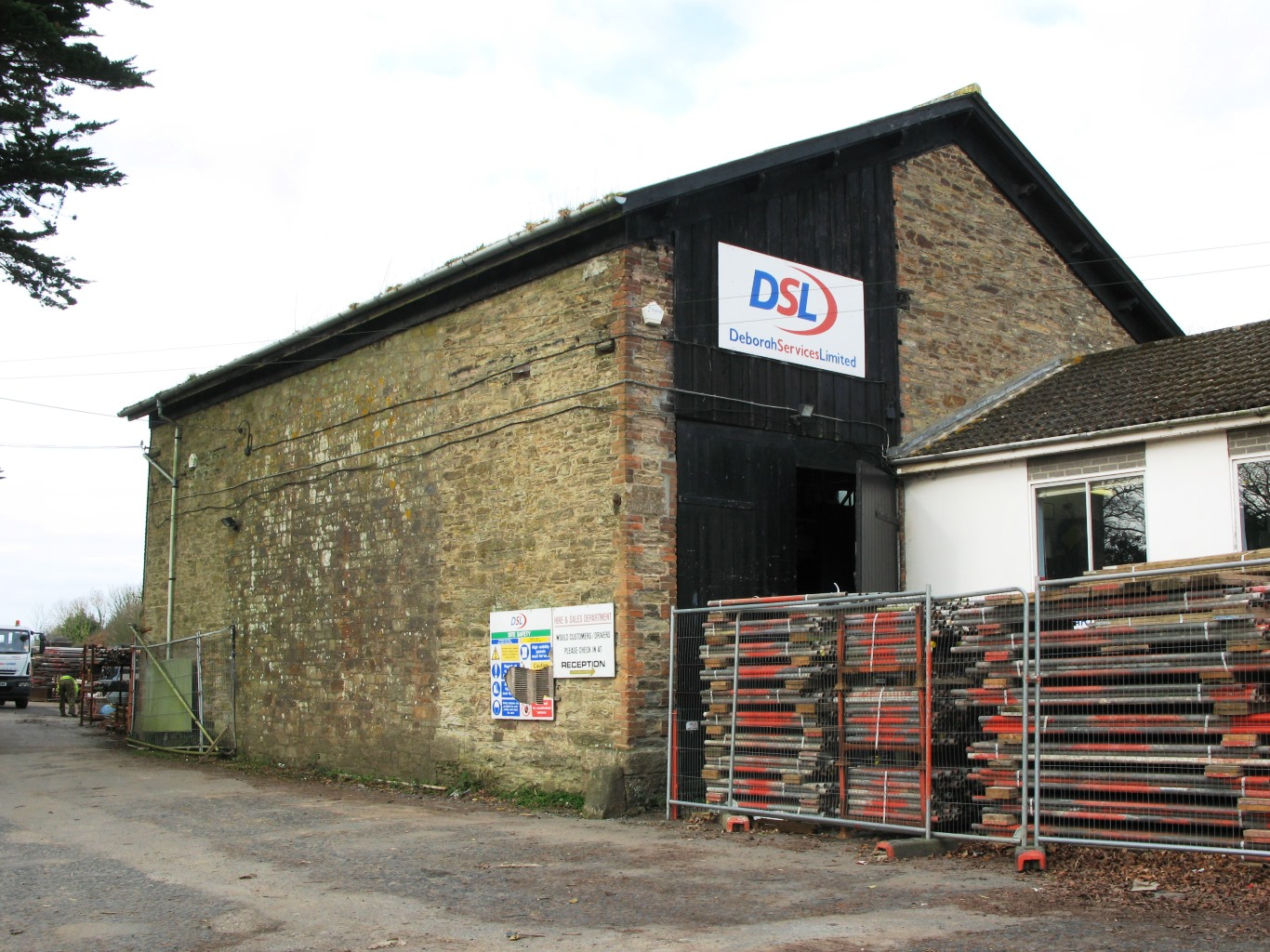
The old goods shed in 2009

The station was opened as 'Perran' on 24 August 1863 when the Cornwall Railway opened the line from Truro to Falmouth. It was renamed 'Perranwell' on 19 February 1864 to avoid confusion with nearby Penryn.

There were originally two platforms either side of a passing loop, and a goods shed with several sidings to south, one of which was equipped with a two-ton crane. The yard was able to accommodate live stock and most types of goods. The signal box was very distinctive, being sited on girders above the track alongside the goods shed. It was removed in the 1960s, at the same time as the goods sidings.

A GWR camp coach was sited at the station from 1936 to 1939, and the Western Region also provided one from 1952 to 1964.

The goods shed still stands in the forecourt despite goods traffic ceasing on 4 January 1965. A drinking fountain on the platform is a reminder of more important days, although it is no longer in use.

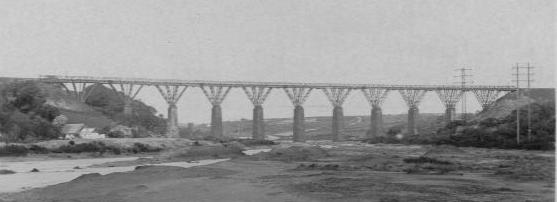
The original Carnon viaduct

A short distance on either side of the station, valleys had to be crossed on lofty timber viaducts. Carnon viaduct is to the north of the station, crossing above the Carnon River valley and the former Redruth and Chasewater Railway. In the other direction, trains cross the smaller Perran Viaduct.

== Description ==
Perranwell is 304 miles 78 chains (490.8 km; 304.98 mi) from London Paddington (measured via Box) which is 4 miles 15 chains (6.7 km; 4.19 mi) from Truro. There is a single platform with level access from the car park, and a ticket machine, information boards and a waiting shelter on the platform.

== Services ==
A new loop at Penryn allowed the services frequency on the Maritime Line to be doubled from 17 May 2009, giving up to a half-hourly service. However, when two trains are operating, only alternate services call at Perranwell.

Preceding station	National Rail	Following station
Penryn towards Falmouth Docks	Great Western Railway Maritime Line	Truro Terminus

== Passengers ==
Passengers starting and finishing journeys at Perranwell used to be in the order of 10,000 each year but with the increased service frequency after 2009 they increased to more than 27,000 and since 2014 have consistently exceeded 30,000. During the COVID-19 pandemic in the United Kingdom they dropped to fewer than 11,000 but quickly returned to pre-COVID levels. In 2024–2025 they exceeded 40,000 for the first time.

Passengers by year
Year (Note: The passenger data covers twelve month periods that start in April.)	Entries and exits
1997–1998	10,261
1998–1999	11,224
1999–2000	8,279
2000–2001	10,717
2001–2002	11,468
2002–2003	11,110
2003–2004	No data
2004–2005	9,936
2005–2006	9,545
2006–2007	10,489
2007–2008	9,842
2008–2009	12,880
2009–2010	17,658
2010–2011	21,454
2011–2012	27,030
2012–2013	27,478
2013–2014	28,842
2014–2015	35,646
2015–2016	30,530
2016–2017	34,652
2017–2018	31,504
2018–2019	31,920
2019–2020	33,168
2020–2021	10,718
2021–2022	29,566
2022–2023	31,926
2023–2024	35,502
2024–2025	41,538
2025–2026	48,194

== Community Rail ==
The railway from Truro to Falmouth is designated as a community rail line and is supported by marketing provided by the Devon and Cornwall Rail Partnership. The line is promoted as the 'Maritime Line'.

== Bibliography ==
- Bennett, Alan (1988). The Great Western Railway in Mid Cornwall. Kingfisher Railway Publications. ISBN 0-946184-53-4.
- Wills, Dixe (2014). Tiny Stations (Paperback, 1st reprint ed.). Basingstoke: AA Publishing. ISBN 978-0-7495-7732-2.
