= Falmouth Town railway station =

Railway station in Cornwall, England

Falmouth Town Arwennek Aberfala
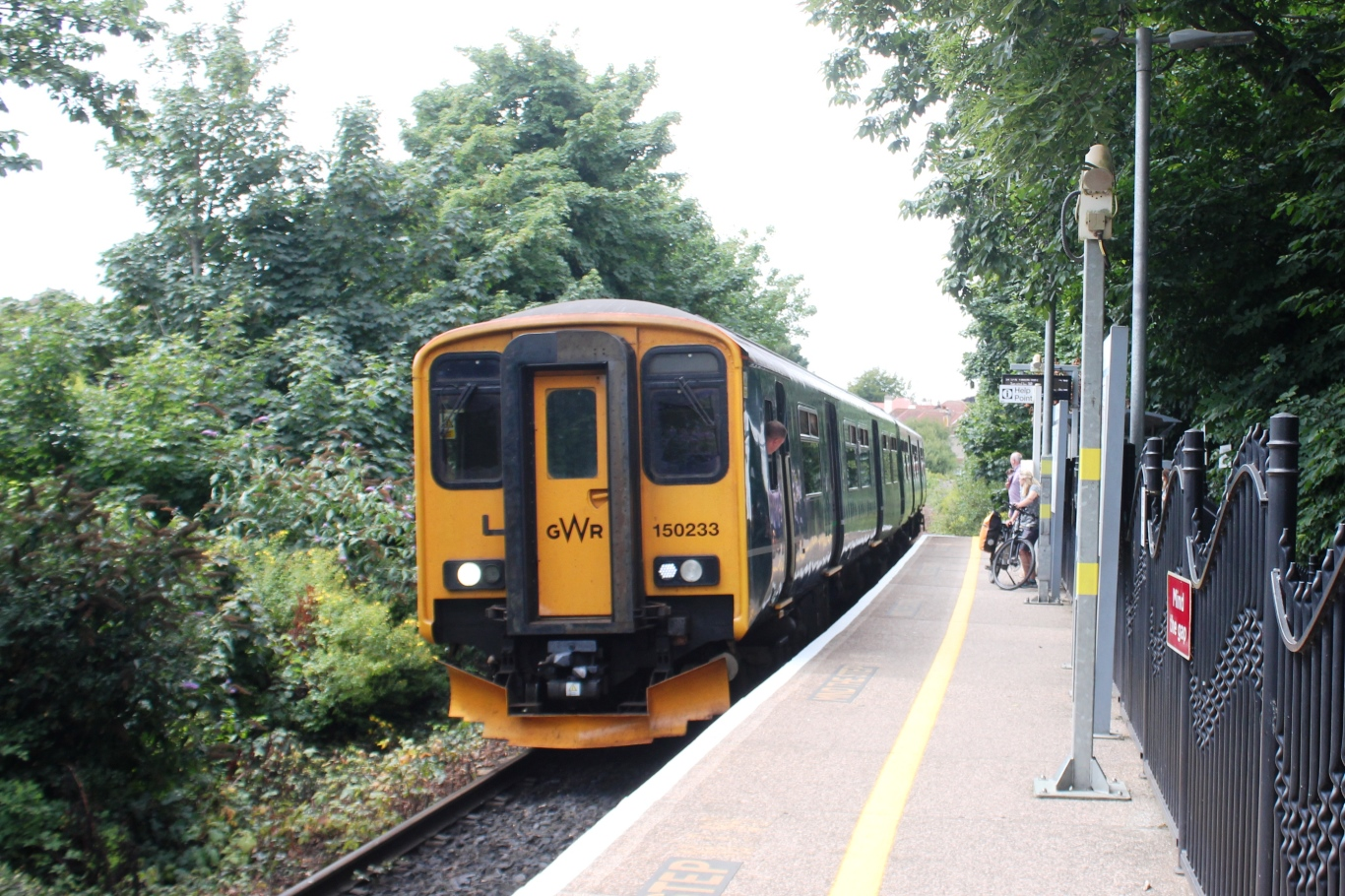

General information
- Location: Falmouth, Cornwall; England
- Coordinates: 50.1484°N 5.0642°W
- Grid reference: SW810320
- Managed by: Great Western Railway
- Platforms: 1

Other information
- Station code: FMT
- Classification: DfT category F1

History
- Original company: Western Region of British Railways

Key dates
- 7 December 1970: Opened as 'Falmouth'
- 5 May 1975: Renamed 'The Dell'
- 15 May 1989: Renamed 'Falmouth Town'

Passengers
- 2020/21: ▼85,498
- 2021/22: ▲0.233 million
- 2022/23: ▲0.244 million
- 2023/24: ▲0.247 million
- 2024/25: ▲0.278 million
Location
Notes
- Passenger statistics from the Office of Rail and Road

Falmouth Town railway station (Cornish: Arwennek Aberfala) is the most central of the stations in Falmouth, Cornwall, England. It is unstaffed; the station and the trains are operated by Great Western Railway. Despite only being opened in 1970, the station has been known by three different names: Falmouth, The Dell, and Falmouth Town.

== History ==
The station was opened as Falmouth by British Rail on 7 December 1970 when the branch line was cut back by 845 metres (924 yd) to terminate here. The platform was constructed using components from Perranporth Beach Halt which had closed in 1963.

It was renamed The Dell on 5 May 1975 when the original Falmouth station was reopened, subsequently being renamed again, this time to Falmouth Town on 15 May 1989.

== Facilities ==
There is just one platform on the north side of the line (the side nearest the town centre) reached by a ramp from the car park. The platform is constructed from concrete slabs and piers, and a metal and glass waiting shelter is provided. The station is unstaffed but there is a ticket machine located at the bottom of the ramp to the platform.

== Location ==
The station is close to the National Maritime Museum Cornwall, and is the closest serving station for Falmouth University's Woodlane Campus. Both are indicated on the station's signs.

== Services ==
All trains on the Maritime Line are operated by Great Western Railway. They run seven days each week and operate every half-hour Monday to Saturday daytime and hourly at other times.

Preceding station	National Rail	Following station
Penmere towards Truro	Great Western Railway Maritime Line	Falmouth Docks Terminus

== Community Rail ==
The railway from Truro to Falmouth is designated as a community rail line and is supported by marketing provided by the Devon and Cornwall Rail Partnership. The line is promoted under the "Maritime Line" name.

This station offers access to the South West Coast Path
Distance to path	¼ mile
Next station anticlockwise	Par 38 miles
Next station clockwise	Falmouth Docks ½ mile
