= Penmere railway station =

Railway station in Cornwall, England

Penmere Pennmeur
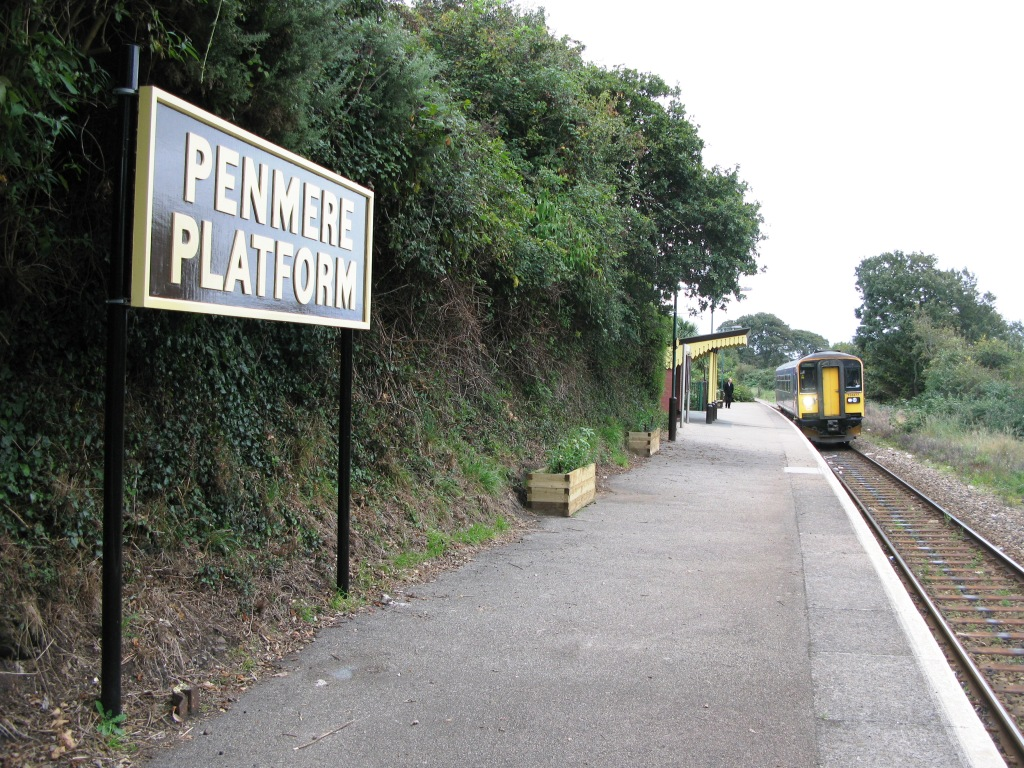

General information
- Location: Falmouth, Cornwall; England
- Coordinates: 50.151°N 5.083°W
- Grid reference: SW798323
- Managed by: Great Western Railway
- Platforms: 1

Other information
- Station code: PNM
- Classification: DfT category F1

History
- Original company: Great Western Railway

Key dates
- Opened: 1925

Passengers
- 2020/21: ▼77,144
- 2021/22: ▲0.185 million
- 2022/23: ▼0.178 million
- 2023/24: ▼0.176 million
- 2024/25: ▲0.209 million
Location
Notes
- Passenger statistics from the Office of Rail and Road

Penmere railway station (Cornish: Pennmeur) serves the northern part of Falmouth, Cornwall, England. It is on the Maritime Line between Truro and Falmouth Docks. The station is managed by, and the trains operated by, Great Western Railway.

== History ==
The station was opened by the Great Western Railway on 1 July 1925. Sidings were opened into an oil depot on 1 April 1940 and were closed again on 16 November 1967. In December 2009, an old bridge at the Truro end of the platform was knocked down without warning. In its place, all that remains is the side of the bridge in the right embankment.

== Location ==
There is just one platform with level access from the car park. The station is within walking distance of the top of The Moor, in the centre of the town.

== Services ==
The station is served by two trains each way each hour during weekday daytime, with a reduced service in the evenings and on Sundays.

Preceding station	National Rail	Following station
Penryn towards Truro	Great Western Railway Maritime Line	Falmouth Town towards Falmouth Docks

== Community Rail ==
The station is well cared for, as it is looked after by the Friends of Penmere Station. The station was shortlisted in the national Best Kept Small Station Award in 2002 and was awarded second prize in the Station Gardens Competition in 2005.

The railway from Truro to Falmouth is designated as a community rail line and is supported by marketing provided by the Devon and Cornwall Rail Partnership. The line is promoted under the "Maritime Line" name.
