= Carnon =

Carnon may refer to:

- Carnon, or Carnon-Plage, a seaside resort in southern France, on the territory of the commune of Mauguio
- Carnon Downs, a village in Cornwall, United Kingdom
- Carnon River, a river in Cornwall, United Kingdom
- Carnon viaduct, in west Cornwall, United Kingdom
