= Maritime Line =

Railway branch line in Cornwall, England

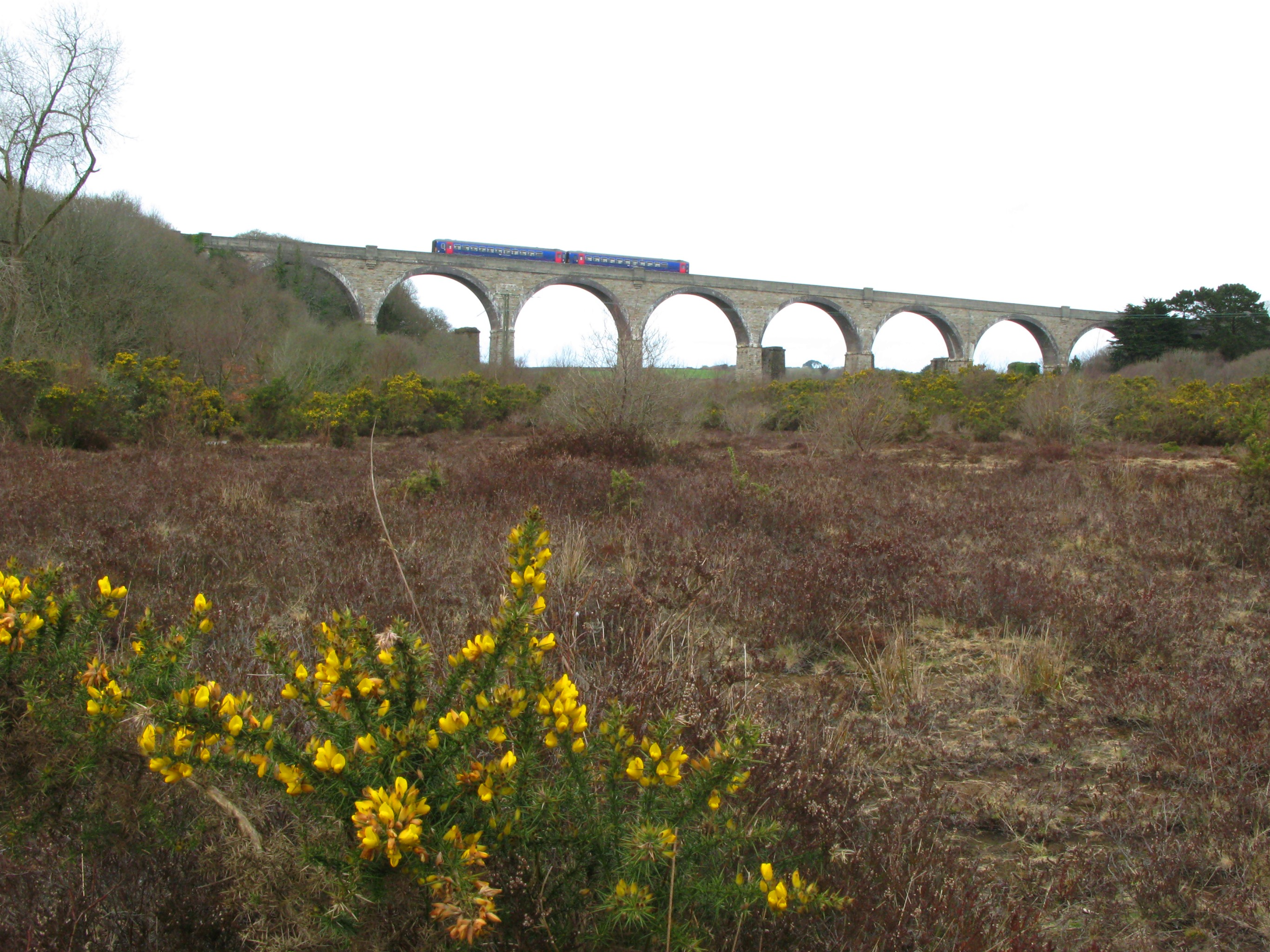
- A train crosses Carnon viaduct on its way towards Truro

Overview
- Status: Open
- Owner: Network Rail
- Locale: Cornwall
- Termini: Truro (Note: Truro station is located at 50.2640°N 5.0649°W); Falmouth Docks (Note: Falmouth Docks station is located at 50.1508°N 5.0558°W)
- Stations: 6

Service
- Type: Heavy rail
- System: National Rail
- Operator: Great Western Railway
- Rolling stock: Class 150

History
- Opened: 1863

Technical
- Line length: 11.75 miles (19 km)
- Number of tracks: 1
- Character: Community rail
- Track gauge: 4 ft 8 1/2 in (1,435 mm)
- Loading gauge: RA6 / W7
- Operating speed: 50 mph (80 km/h)
Route map
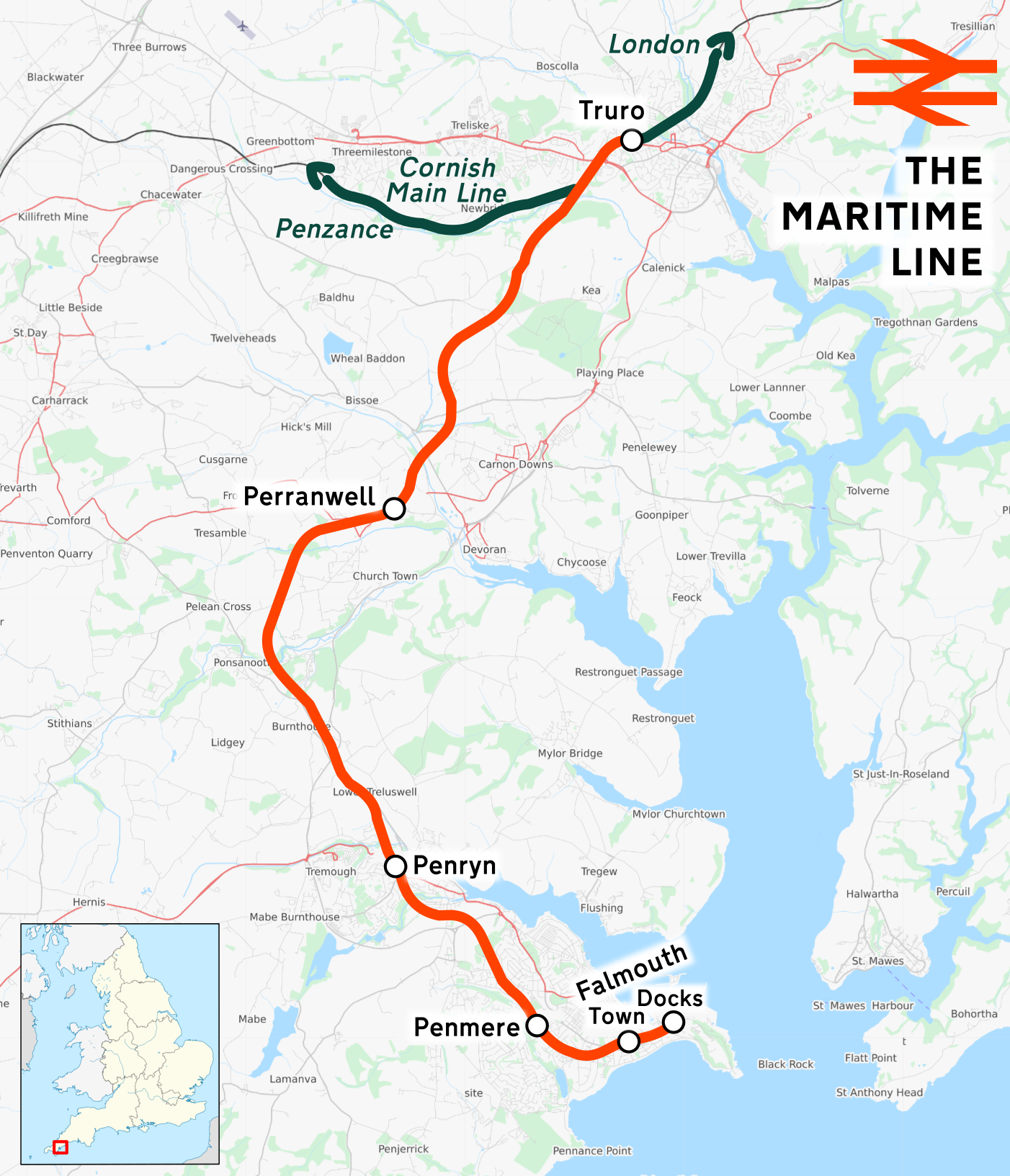

The Maritime Line is a Branch line railway in Cornwall, England, between the city of Truro and Falmouth Docks. Having opened in 1863, all passengers services and stations on the line are currently operated and managed by Great Western Railway.

== History ==
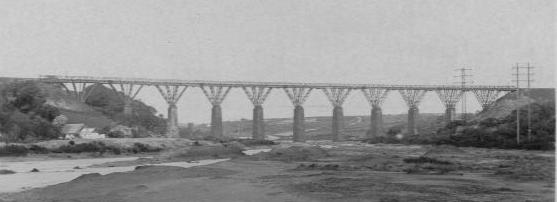
The original timber-built Carnon viaduct

The railway line, now known as the 'Maritime Line', was built by the Cornwall Railway as a broad gauge line of 7 ft (2,134 mm) gauge from Plymouth to Falmouth. The purpose of the scheme was to link London with Falmouth, a port where packet ships sailed to destinations in Europe, Africa and America. As the main line of the company, the line was intended to be constructed double-tracked throughout.

Construction commenced in 1847 but the main contractor suffered financial problems which put a temporary stop to any work. Efforts restarted in 1859 on completion of the line from Plymouth to Truro, which opened on 4 May that year. The inhabitants of Falmouth soon put pressure on the company to complete the line to their town, as originally intended, and a further Act of Parliament was obtained in 1861. The line was costly to build with six viaducts and two tunnels and it opened on 24 August 1863, by which time the packet ships had been diverted elsewhere. The connection from Falmouth station to the docks was opened in 1864.

After the West Cornwall Railway between Truro and Penzance was converted to broad gauge in 1867, the Truro to Falmouth line tended to be operated as a branch, with the trains from London Paddington and Plymouth operating to Penzance instead.

The original stations on the line were at Truro, Perranwell (known as Perran until 19 February 1864), Penryn and Falmouth (now Falmouth Docks). Penmere was added on 1 July 1925, and Falmouth Town (originally known as Falmouth and later as The Dell) opened on 7 December 1970. The line terminated at the Town station for five years before reopening to the original terminus at the docks in 1975 to permit through services from London.

The Cornwall Railway was amalgamated into the Great Western Railway on 1 July 1889. Following the amalgamation, plans were put in place for conversion to standard gauge, which took place over the weekend of 21 May 1892. The Great Western Railway was nationalised into British Railways on 1 January 1948.

=== 21st century ===
Work underway at Penryn to extend the platform while the train uses the new loop

The line was originally double tracked at Penryn, to provide a crossing place. Evidence of the double track can be seen at Penryn station, where two platforms are still visible. The Beeching Report in the 1960s instigated the reduction of the line there from two to one.

A proposal was made in 2004 to reinstate a passing loop on the line, to allow for a doubling of service frequency. Funding was agreed with £4.67 million coming from European Union funds, £2.5 million from Cornwall Council and £600,000 from Network Rail. The new 400-metre (440 yd) loop was installed over two long weekends in October 2008 and work on the platform extension was also started. The loop was brought into use ahead of schedule and to budget, with the formal opening by Kevin Lavery, the Chief Executive of Cornwall Council, taking place at Penryn station on 18 May 2009. Works included a new car park and waiting shelter at Penryn, in addition to the new loop, signalling and platform lengthening.

== Future plans: Mid-Cornwall Metro ==
The Mid-Cornwall Metro scheme proposes hourly extensions of the service from Falmouth beyond Truro to St Austell and Newquay with a reversal at Par. This will create a coast-to-coast through service with the aim of easing road congestion for people living along the route.

The scheme was chosen to reach the next stage of the government's Restoring your Railway programme in 2022.

The first stage of the scheme services between Par and Newquay increased to hourly from May 2026. The full service connecting these to Falmouth are intended to commence in 2027.

== Route ==
Maritime Line trains start from Truro railway station, usually originating from the bay platform, at the left side of the main platform beyond the footbridge. The trains join the main line for the first half-mile to Penwithers Junction, passing through the 70-yard (64 m)-long Higher Town Tunnel on the way.

At this point the line to Penzance curves away to the right; the line to Falmouth was originally the Cornwall Railway main line and so runs straight ahead while the Penzance line was built by the West Cornwall Railway Company. The Maritime Line today only has a junction with the westbound (down) line; trains running towards Truro (the up direction) come inbound on the down main line, the same line used by trains departing Truro for Penzance. The line from Penwithers Junction to Falmouth Docks has always been single track.

One and a half miles from the junction, the line enters Sparnick Tunnel, which is a little over a quarter of a mile long. Although the line has only ever had a single track, most of the engineering, including the tunnels, was designed to carry a second one. The line, which heads south-westwards until this point, now heads towards the south and passes high above the silted-up Restronguet Creek on Carnon viaduct. This valley was the route of the Redruth and Chasewater Railway down to quays at Devoran, about a mile beyond the viaduct.

Perranwell station

A half-mile later, the line comes to Perranwell railway station, nearly four miles from Truro. A modern shelter is situated on the platform, built in a style inspired by older railway buildings. As with all stations except for Truro, the platform is on the left as the train travels towards Falmouth. In the forecourt is the old Cornwall Railway goods shed.

The line now begins to head west, passing over the short Perran Viaduct and then south again along the hillside above Perranwell village before passing through the 374-yard (342 m)-long Perran Tunnel. Turning south-eastwards, the line now passes over Ponsanooth Viaduct, the tallest on the line. Ponsanooth village is on the hillside to the right, while the River Kennal runs below to join up with Restronguet Creek.

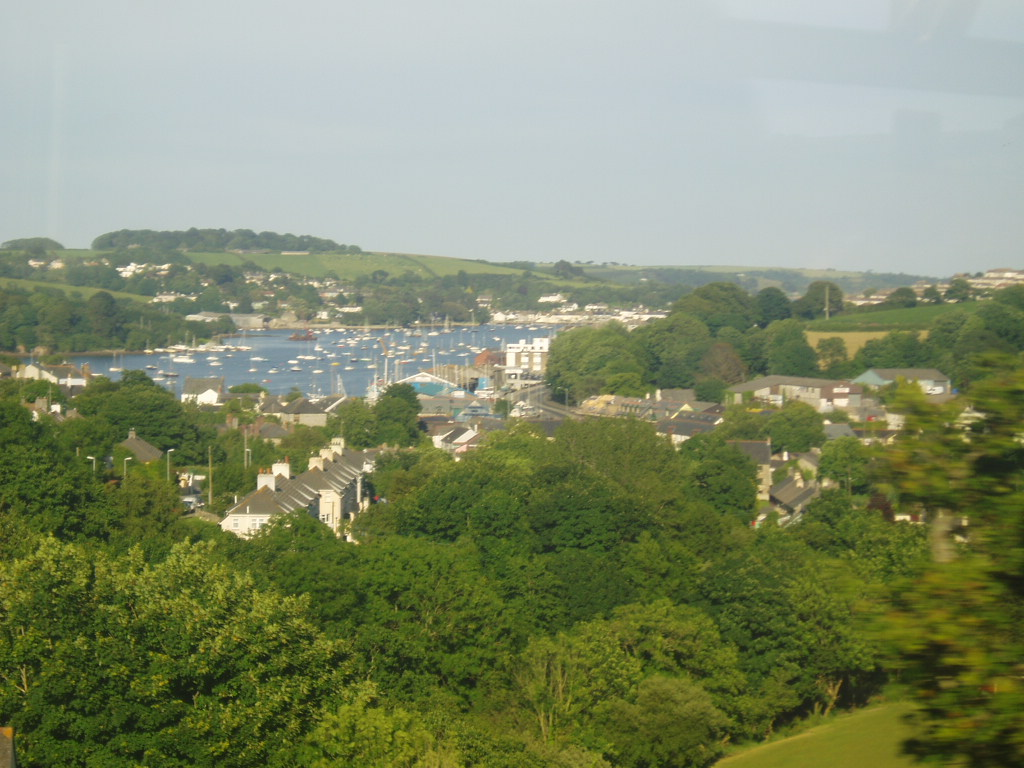
View of Penryn from the train

The line passes beneath the A39 road from Truro to Falmouth at and then enters the town of Penryn which grew up at the head of a large inlet of the River Fal. Penryn railway station is at the top of the town, and there are views across the town to St Gluvias on the other side of the harbour. The station is eight and a quarter miles from Truro, and the platform shelter is identical to the one at Perranwell. Beyond the station the line passes over the Collegewood Viaduct.

At Penryn there is a wide open space now occupied by student housing for the Tremough Campus of the University of Falmouth. This was the goods yard where wagons were loaded and unloaded. There is also another platform visible on the other side of the train, though it is overgrown.

The line soon enters the outskirts of Falmouth. The town was established at the entrance to the inlet that leads to Penryn; it has now nearly spread to reach that town. Trains first call at Penmere railway station, useful for people heading for the top of The Moor in the town centre, or for the newer western suburbs. Passengers get a quick glimpse on their right of Falmouth Bay before trains call at the concrete platform of Falmouth Town railway station, which is nearer the National Maritime Museum, the waterside, and the shops. The station itself was constructed using items that were reclaimed from Perranporth Beach Halt after that station closed. It is now just a short distance to the terminus at Falmouth Docks railway station, 11.75 miles (18.91 km) from Truro. Falmouth Docks are below the station on the left, Pendennis Castle overlooks both the station and the docks. Sidings serve the docks but are little used. Gyllyngvase beach is on the other side of the line.

=== Infrastructure ===
When the line opened the signals were controlled by 'policemen' who walked between them. Signals and points at Truro station were in 1874 and signal boxes built in 1876. Other signal boxes were built at

- Penwithers Junction. Opened by 1879, rebuilt 1893, closed 7 November 1971. 36 Levers.
- Perranwell. Opened 1894, closed 18 April 1966. Built in an elevated position next to the platform above a siding. 21 levers.
- Penryn. Opening date unknown, rebuilt 1894 and again 14 June 1923, closed 7 November 1971 when replaced by a Ground Frame which was itself removed in 1979. 32 levers from 1923.
- Falmouth. Opening date unknown, rebuilt 1894, closed 27 February 1966 when replaced by a Ground Frame.

The Maritime Line crosses several steep-sided valleys that carry tributaries of the River Fal and there were originally eight viaducts built to cross these:

- Penwithers Viaduct. 90 foot (27 m) high and 813 foot (248 m) long. Originally ten stone piers each topped by a wooden fan but buried in an embankment as an alternative to rebuilding in 1926.
- Ringwell Viaduct. 70 foot (21 m) high and 366 foot (112 m) long. Originally of stone piers topped by a series of wooden fans. Scheduled for rebuilding in 1880 but replaced by an embankment in 1933.
- Carnon Viaduct. 96 foot (29 m) high and 756 foot (230 m) long. Originally eleven stone piers each topped by a wooden fan but a new viaduct of 9 stone piers built adjacent in 1933.
- Perran Viaduct. 56 foot (17 m) high and 339 foot (103 m) long. Originally five stone piers each topped by a wooden fan but a new viaduct also of 5 stone piers built adjacent in 1927.
- Ponsanooth Viaduct. 139 foot (42 m) high and 645 foot (197 m) long. Originally of stone piers topped by a series of wooden fans but a new viaduct built adjacent in 1930.
- Pascoe Viaduct. 70 foot (21 m) high and 390 foot (120 m) long. Originally of stone piers topped by a series of wooden fans but made redundant when the track was realigned on an embankment in 1923.
- Penryn Viaduct. 83 foot (25 m) high and 342 foot (104 m) long. Originally of five stone piers each topped by a wooden fan but made redundant with a major track realignment in 1923 that also involved changing the location of Penryn Station.
- Collegewood Viaduct. 100 foot (30 m) high and 954 foot (291 m) long. Originally fourteen stone piers each topped by a wooden fan built on a left-handed curve (travelling in the down direction). It was replaced by a stone version built alongside in 1934 by which time it was the last surviving Brunel wooden viaduct in Cornwall.

== Passenger volume ==
The majority of passengers on the Maritime Line travel between Truro and the three stations in Falmouth, the busiest of which is Falmouth Town, although passenger numbers at Falmouth Docks increased faster. Comparing the year from April 2008 to that which started in April 2002, passenger numbers at the Docks station increased by 214%, while those at the Town station increased by 38% and at Penmere increased by 42%. Since the doubling of train frequency, the increases have been greater still. For example, between the years starting 2002 and 2010 Penryn's passenger count rose by 247%, Penmere by 126% and Falmouth Docks by 266%. Falmouth Town has increased further by 109%. Even Perranwell, where the extra trains do not always stop, has increased by a healthy 93% (Note: The passenger statistics are for people arriving and departing at each station and cover twelve month periods that start in April.)

Station usage
Station name	2002–03	2004–05	2005–06	2006–07	2007–08	2008–09	2009–10	2010–11	2011–12	2012–13	2013–14	2014–15	2015–16	2016–17	2017–18	2018–19	2019–20	2020–21	2021–22	2022–23	2023–24	2024–25
Perranwell	11,110	9,936	9,545	10,489	9,842	13,348	17,658	21,454	27,030	27,478	28,842	35,646	30,530	34,652	31,504	31,920	33,168	10,718	29,566	31,926		
Penryn	51,934	53,069	58,759	67,472	77,056	93,488	145,088	179,972	211,184	230,112	249,462	266,580	243,802	255,800	251,950	240,156	247,760	99,794	269,252	257,574		
Penmere	67,460	71,676	76,571	75,572	79,227	95,842	132,726	152,118	171,582	184,748	194,838	201,662	202,660	201,614	197,358	191,414	199,352	77,144	185,466	178,116		
Falmouth Town	80,377	85,859	83,899	89,787	91,638	111,012	140,798	167,646	193,844	204,810	214,782	213,840	203,468	208,218	217,262	213,934	222,028	85,498	233,300	243,512		
Falmouth Docks	28,461	38,434	47,316	59,542	67,164	99,304	91,890	92,946	104,408	103,542	109,134	137,296	116,478	99,610	97,532	96,726	114,088	38,320	123,554	123,394		
The annual passenger usage is based on sales of tickets in stated financial years from Office of Rail and Road estimates of station usage. The statistics are for passengers arriving and departing from each station and cover twelve-month periods that start in April. Methodology may vary year on year. Usage since the period 2019–20 have been affected by the COVID-19 pandemic, especially the period 2020–23.

== Services ==
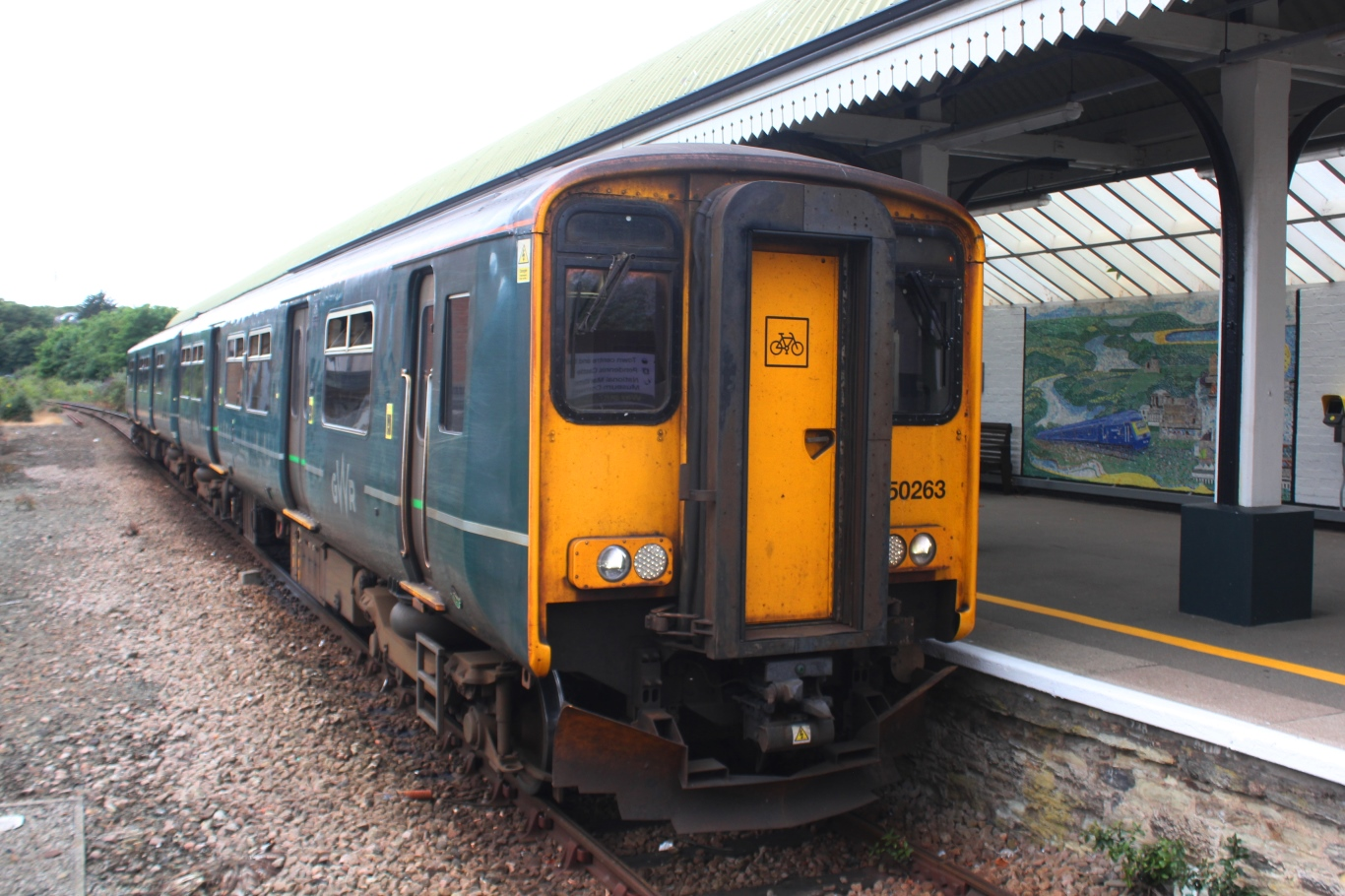
Class 150 arrives at Falmouth Docks having completed its journey from Truro

At the opening of the railway in 1863, there were five trains to and from Falmouth daily with two trains running on Sundays, with trains carrying first, second and third class accommodation. After Cornwall Railway trains were enabled to run through to Penzance on the West Cornwall Railway in 1867, the line to Falmouth was considered a branch line and local services were run on an out-and-back basis from Truro.

Before World War I, the winter timetable for the Cornish Riviera Express showed that it included at least one through carriage for Falmouth, which was detached/attached at Truro; this facility continued until the summer of 1939 until the advent of World War 2 when that train ran through to Penzance only without any portions being attached/detached for any of the Cornish branches.

During the 1950s, through trains were again a feature of traffic on the line and, other than London Paddington, Bradford was one of the less likely destinations for a though train.

The service in the 1960s was 16 or 17 trains daily, but these had been reduced to 12 by 1975. Since the 1970s, trains have only run between Falmouth Docks and Truro. Connections are made at Truro with services on the Cornish Main Line to Penzance Plymouth and beyond.

There were still 12 trains each way every day on summer Saturdays in 1984, with 11 trains each way on weekdays and winter Saturdays, although the last train from Falmouth left earlier on summer Saturdays than on weekdays. In addition there were eight trains each way on summer Sundays, with the first train not leaving Truro until 10.35; there was no Sunday service after 9 September.

There were 13 trains each way by 2008. When the new loop opened in May 2009 at Penryn, the timetable provided for 29 trains which allowed for a service interval of 30 minutes. The enhanced timetable resulted in trains being formed with one coach instead of the former two, but the increase in demand has resulted in GWR allocating sufficient stock to enable both services to be operated by two car units from 2012.

=== Locomotives and stock ===
During the 1960s and 1970, local services between Truro and Falmouth were operated by diesel multiple units, based at Plymouth Laira including:

- Metro-Cammell Class 101s
- BRCW Class 118s
- BR Swindon Class 120s
- Gloucester Class 122 single units.

Locomotive-hauled trains between London Paddington and Falmouth were restored during the summer timetable from 1975, but ceased again at the end of the 1979 summer timetable. During this period, the services consisted on Mark 2 D/E/F coaches and were typically hauled by a Class 50 diesel locomotive.

An unusual working in March 2000 was a visit to Falmouth Docks by preserved Warship Class locomotive number D821, which was renamed Cornwall (Note: D821's name reverted to Greyhound on 29 September 2002.) alongside the Royal Navy ship HMS Cornwall

Since the early 2000s, passenger services have been operated by Class 150 Sprinters although Class 158 Express Sprinters have been used less frequently. Class 153 Super Sprinters also used to operate on the line until their withdrawal from the area in 2019.

As part of the Mid Cornwall Metro, there are plans for use of Class 175 Coradias on the line in the future too alongside the Class 150 units.

=== Community rail ===
The Maritime Line is one of the railway lines supported by the Devon and Cornwall Rail Partnership, an organisation formed in 1991 to promote railway services in the area. The line is promoted by many means such as regular timetable and scenic line guides, as well as leaflets highlighting leisure opportunities such as walking, birdwatching and visiting country pubs.

The Maritime Line rail ale trail was launched in 2003 to encourage rail travellers to visit pubs near the line. Of the 14 participating pubs, four are in Truro, one in Perranwell, three in Penryn and four in Falmouth. 10 stamps collected in the Rail Ale Trail leaflet entitle the participant to claim special Maritime Line Rail Trail tour shirt. The Rail Partnership promote a Foodie Guide to the line to encourage people to visit local cafes, restaurants and food events.

Wessex Trains covered a Class 150 two-car diesel multiple unit (number 150265) in coloured vinyls promoting the line and named it The Falmouth Flyer. The unit continued in service with First Great Western, when the company won the franchise but it has now been repainted in the standard fleet colours. While in its pictorial livery, the unit worked throughout the South West and not just on its named line.

The branch was designated by the Department for Transport as a community rail line in September 2006. This aims to increase the number of passengers and reduce costs. Strategies for investigation include more effective revenue collection, a passing loop, improved bus links, and working with ferry operators and colleges in the area.
