= Penryn railway station =

Railway station in Cornwall, England

Penryn Pennrynn
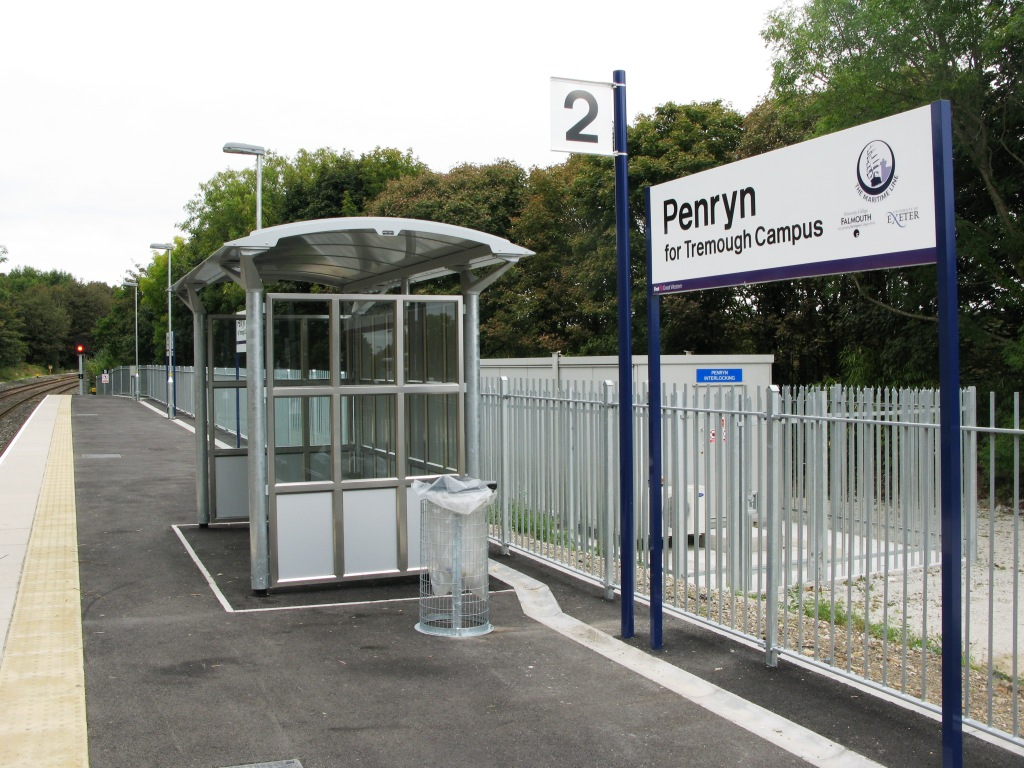
- Looking towards Truro railway station

General information
- Location: Penryn, Cornwall; England
- Coordinates: 50.170°N 5.111°W
- Grid reference: SW779346
- Manager: Great Western Railway
- Platforms: 2

Other information
- Station code: PYN
- Classification: DfT category F1

History
- Original company: Cornwall Railway
- Pre-grouping: Great Western Railway
- Post-grouping: Great Western Railway

Key dates
- Opened: 24 August 1863
- Re-sited: 24 June 1923

Passengers
- 2020/21: ▼99,794
- 2021/22: ▲0.269 million
- 2022/23: ▼0.258 million
- 2023/24: ▼0.247 million
- 2024/25: ▲0.285 million
Location
Notes
- Passenger statistics from the Office of Rail and Road

Penryn railway station (Cornish: Pennrynn) is on the Maritime Line between Truro and Falmouth Docks, and serves the town of Penryn, Cornwall as well as Penryn Campus (formerly known as Tremough Campus).

== History ==
The station was opened on 24 August 1863 when the Cornwall Railway opened the line from Truro to Falmouth. It was sometimes known as Penryn for Helston.

It originally had 2 platforms either side of a passing loop, a goods shed with several sidings to south, one of which was equipped with a 2-ton crane. The yard was able to accommodate livestock and most types of goods.

On 24 June 1923 the station was relocated nearby. The station was host to a GWR camp coach from 1934 to 1938.

The station layout was rationalised to just a single platform when the line was being run by British Rail.

On Monday 8 April 2013 Pay and display was introduced for the station car park.

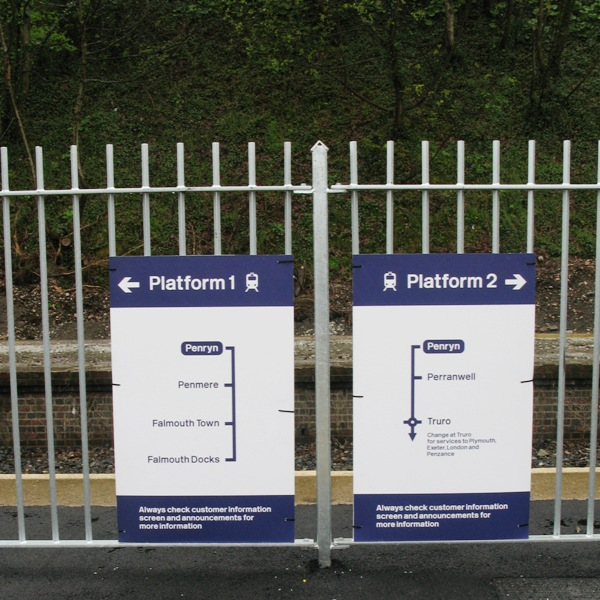
Direction signs erected in 2009

=== Passing Loop ===
A new 400-metre (440 yd) passing loop was installed in 2008, being brought into use in 2009 before the new timetable commenced on 17 May as this called for two trains to be in operation on the branch for most of the day. To pay for this work £4.67million was provided from European Union funds, £2.5million from Cornwall Council, and £600,000 from Network Rail. The new works were formally opened by Kevin Lavery, the Chief Executive of Cornwall Council, on 18 May 2009.

When constructing the loop a novel approach was adopted which avoided the building of a footbridge and works to the disused platform. The formerly disused northern end of the platform has been reinstated, and is now called Platform 2, and an extension has been built onto the southern end which is now called Platform 1. The middle section of the platform is now used to pass between the two. The extension and reinstatement creates a single platform of 238 metres (781 ft) in length; the southern end of the loop joins the main branch at the northern end of Platform 1. New modern shelters have been built on each platform, and the brick shelter from 1998 still exists.

The disused platform on the far side of the loop line was formerly used by northbound trains towards Truro.

== Signalling ==
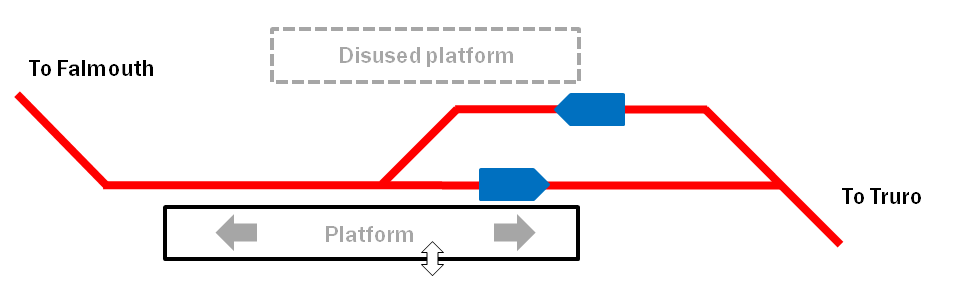
A diagram showing the right-hand running through the loop line.

The signals and points for the passing loop installed in 2009 were controlled from the signal box at Truro. Axle counters allow one train to be in the section between Penwithers Junction and Penryn, and another between Penryn and Falmouth Docks. The Up and Down Branch line (the platform line) is signalled for trains in either direction; the Down Loop is only signalled for trains towards Falmouth. Since Truro signal box closed in 2024 the signalling at Penryn has been controlled from the Mid Cornwall Workstation at Exeter Panel Signal Box.

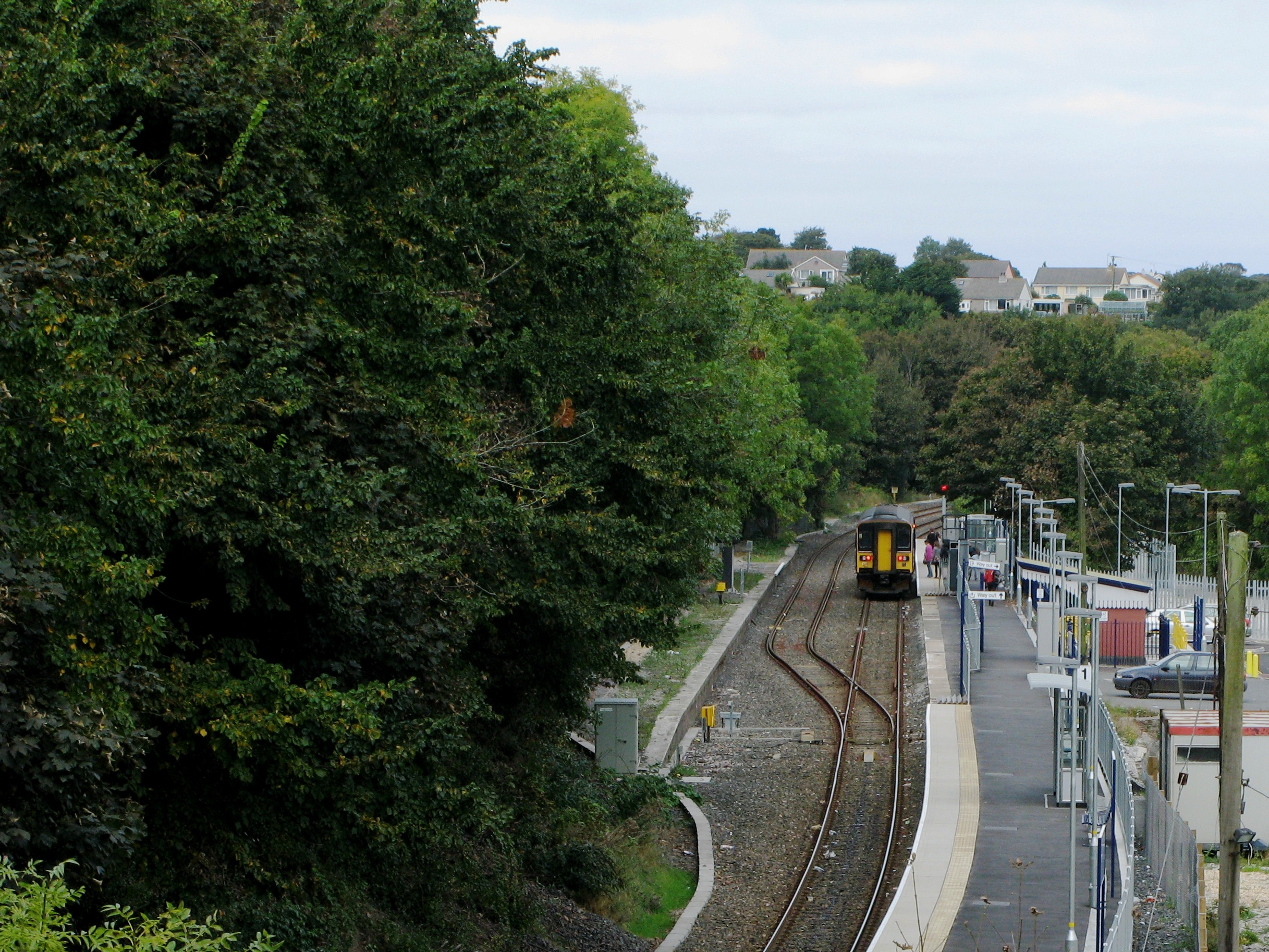
First, a train arrives in platform 2 from Falmouth...

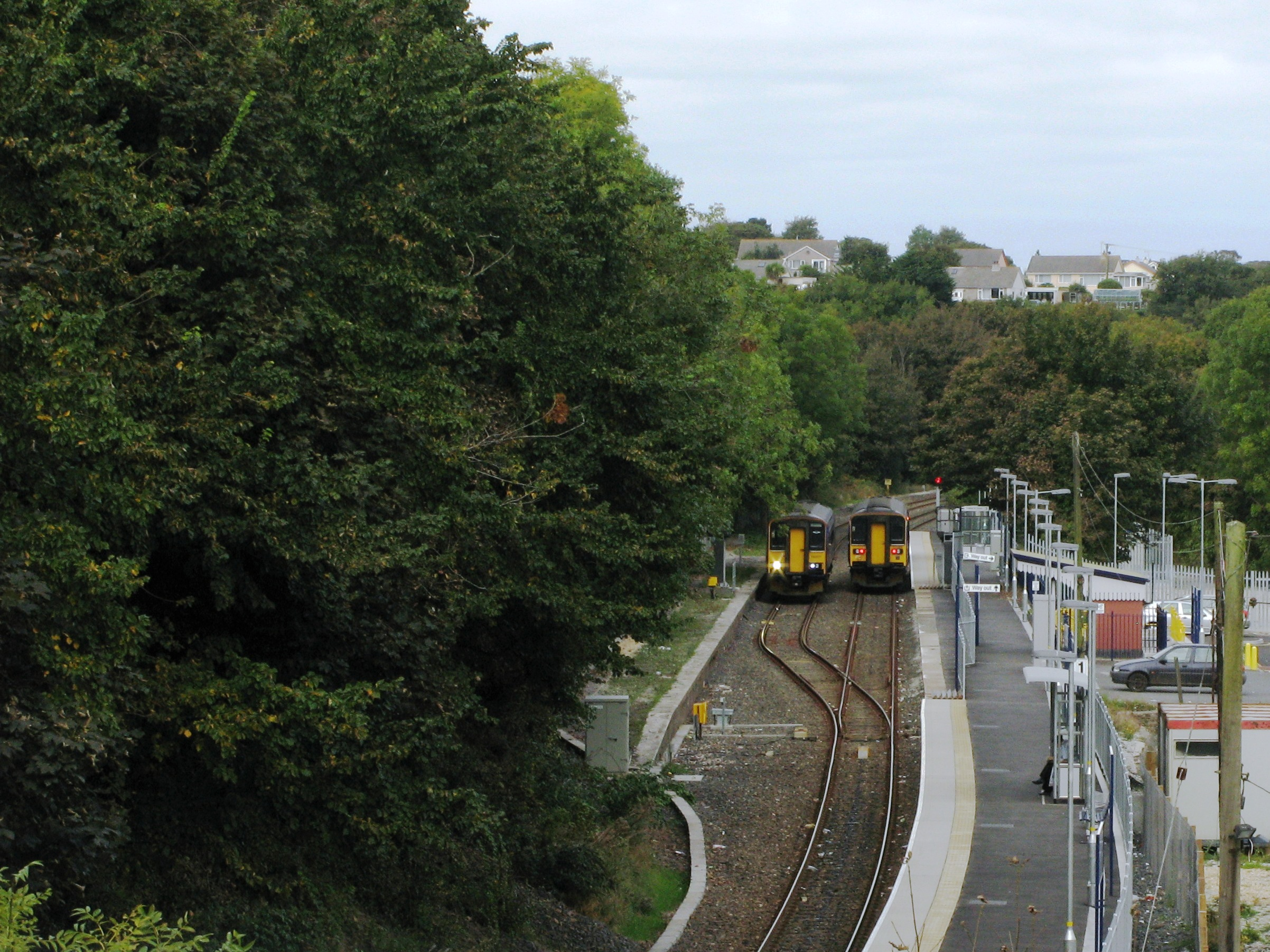
then the train from Truro (left) runs through the loop...

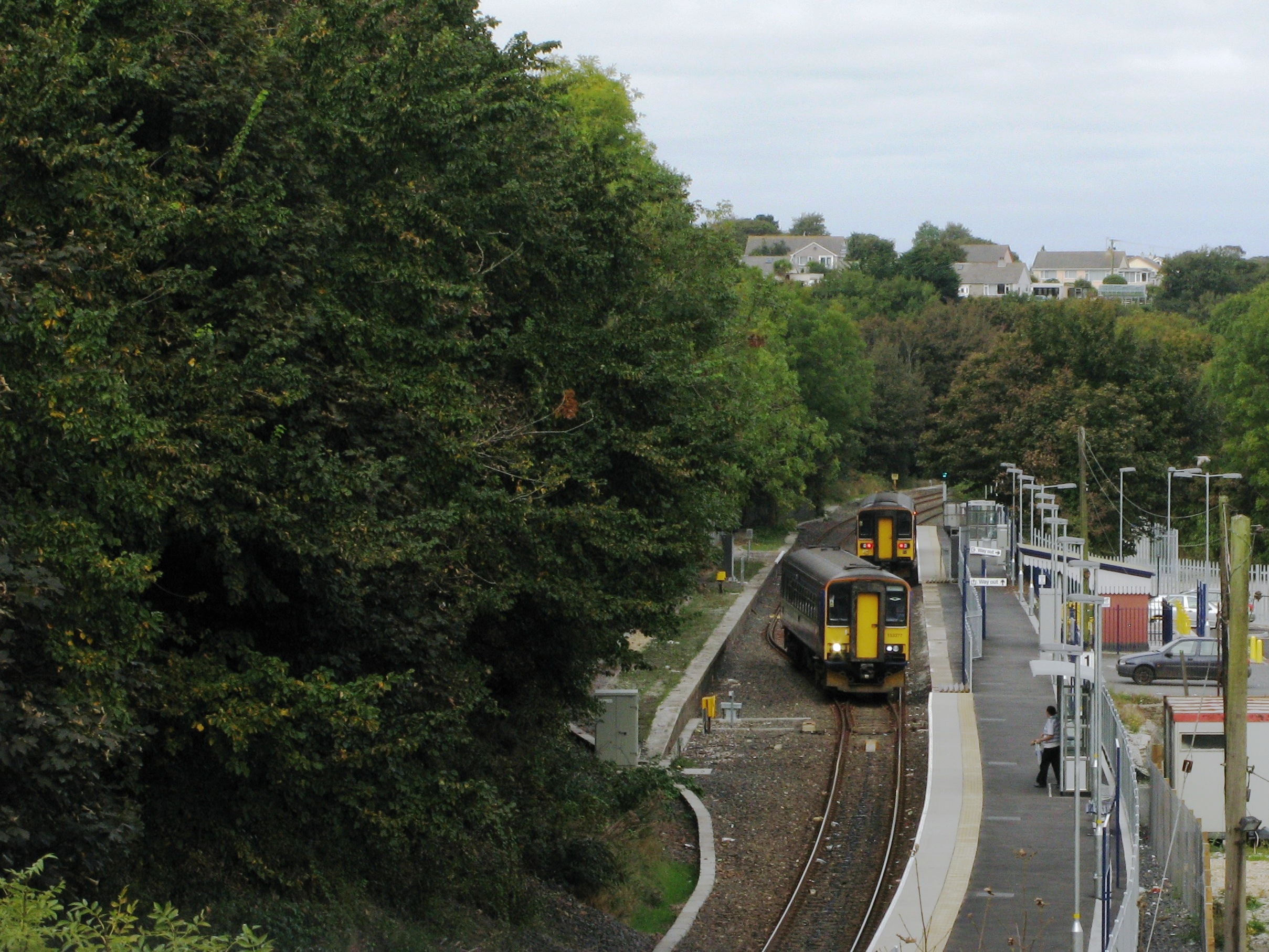
and enters platform 1...

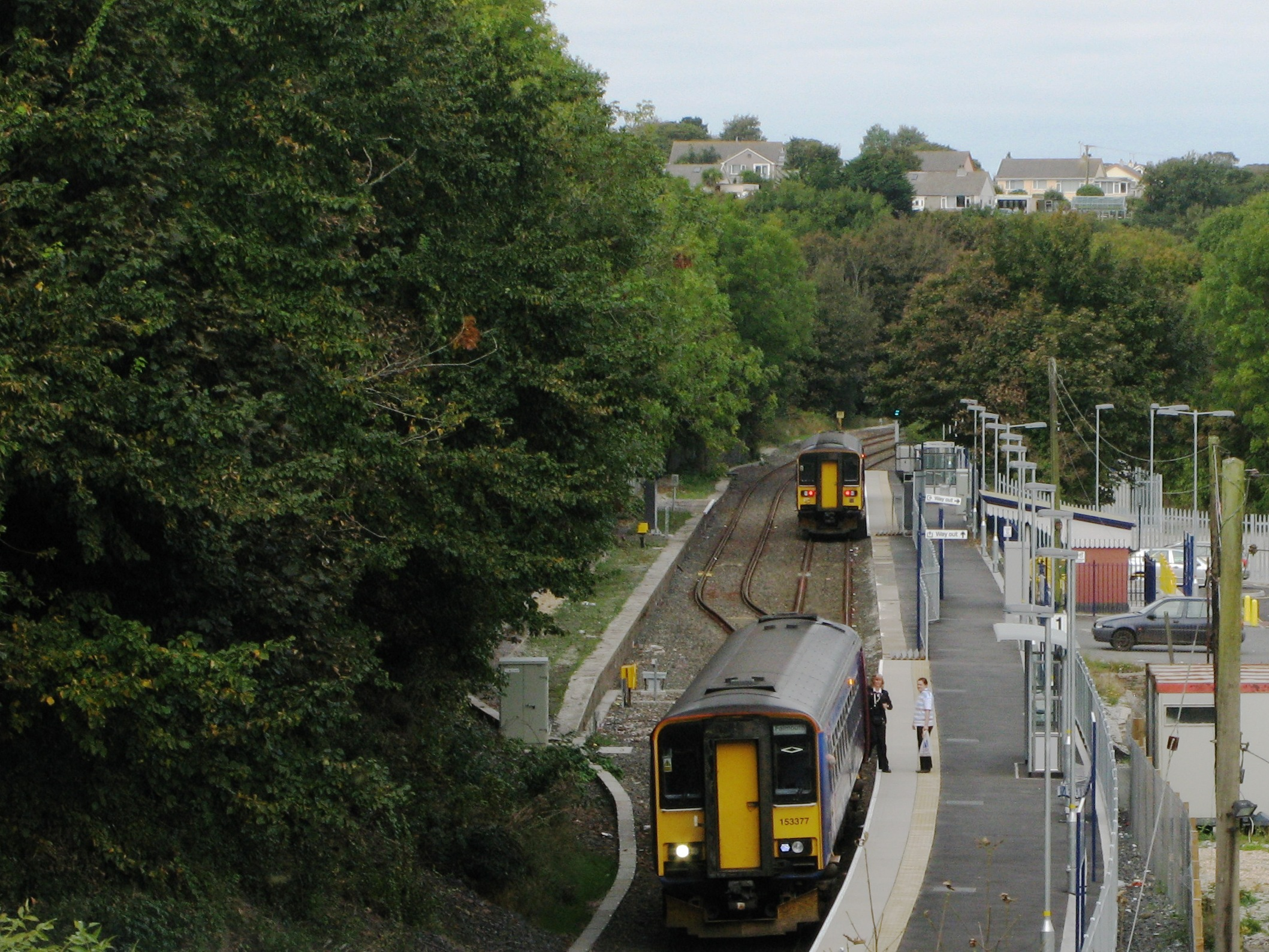
then both can leave once their passengers are on board.

== Services ==
All trains on the Maritime Line are operated by Great Western Railway. They run seven days each week and operate every half-hour Monday to Saturday daytime and hourly at other times. Trains are scheduled to depart simultaneously for Truro and Falmouth.

Preceding station	National Rail	Following station
Perranwell towards Truro	Great Western Railway Maritime Line	Penmere towards Falmouth Docks

== Community Rail ==
The railway from Truro to Falmouth is designated as a community rail line and is supported by marketing provided by the Devon and Cornwall Rail Partnership. The line is promoted under the "Maritime Line" name.
