= Falmouth Docks =

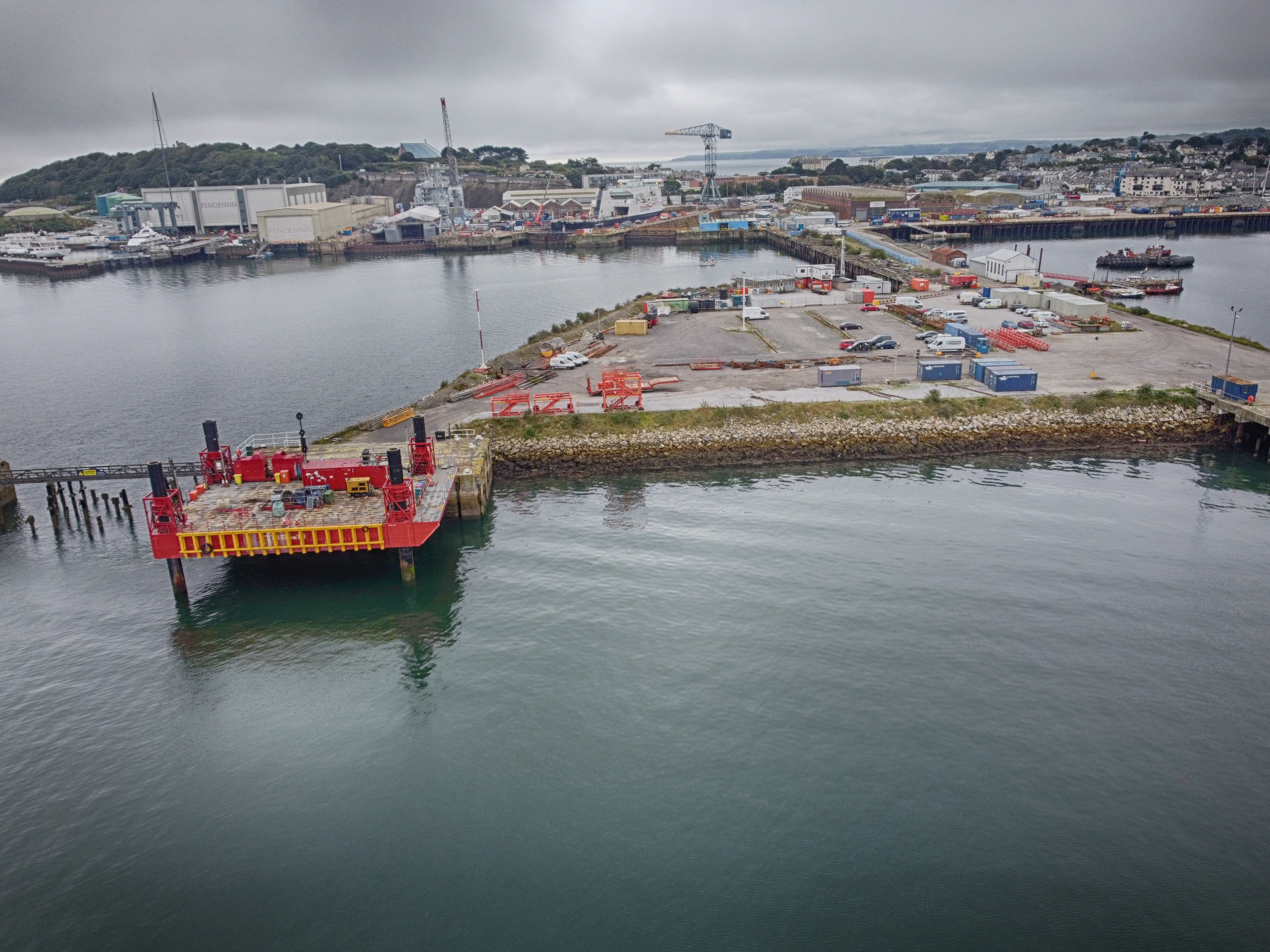
- Falmouth Docks looking South East
- Interactive map of Falmouth Docks
- Location in Cornwall

Location
- Country: United Kingdom
- Location: Falmouth, Cornwall
- Coordinates: 50.15230°N 5.05566°W

Details
- Owned by: Falmouth Docks & Engineering Co Ltd

Falmouth Docks are a deep-water docks of the town of Falmouth in Cornwall, England, United Kingdom. The docks are the southern shore of the Fal Estuary which is the third largest natural harbour in the world and the deepest in Europe. They extend over 30 hectares (74 acres) and covers a range of services to shipping such as repair, refuelling, cleaning and disposal of waste services. The docks are served by the Falmouth Docks railway station. Policing is by the Falmouth Docks Police.

== Location ==
The town of Falmouth is on the south coast of Cornwall in the sheltered natural harbour of the River Fal. Because of the danger of attacks from the sea the earliest towns were inland at Penryn, Tregony and Truro. In the late 17th century the small town of Falmouth developed with shipbuilding and chandlers and the import of iron, coal, charcoal and timber, and the export of fish to the Mediterranean countries and tin. The Post Office selected Falmouth for its Packet Service in 1688 to Spain and Portugal. A sheltered harbour in the south-west meant ships did not have to sail down channel against westerlies and the Lizard Peninsula gave shelter from those same westerlies. At Its peak In the early 19th-century there were forty vessels sailing to seven ′stations′. A map of Falmouth Haven in the British Museum shows, on the site of Falmouth Docks, Porthan Withe which translates from Cornish as the ″port of shelter or protection″.

Falmouth Docks are built on the northern shore of Pendennis Point, on the estuary of the River Fal which is also known as Carrick Roads. The Fal Estuary is often described as the third largest natural harbour in the world and the deepest in Europe. On the southern side of the docks are Falmouth Docks Railway Station and the terminus of the A39 road.

== History ==
Falmouth Docks and Harbour Act 1859
- Act of Parliament
- Parliament of the United Kingdom
- Long title: An Act for making Docks and other Works in Falmouth Harbour in the County of Cornwall; and for other Purposes.
- Citation: 22 Vict. c. xvi

Dates
- Royal assent: 19 April 1859

Other legislation
- Repealed by: Falmouth Docks Act 1959

Status: Repealed

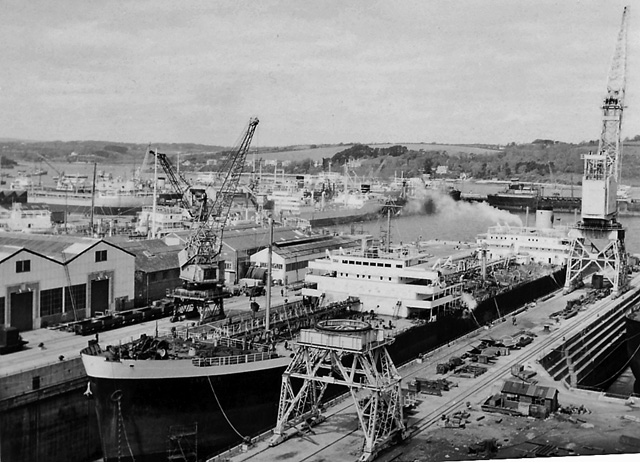
Falmouth Docks in 1960

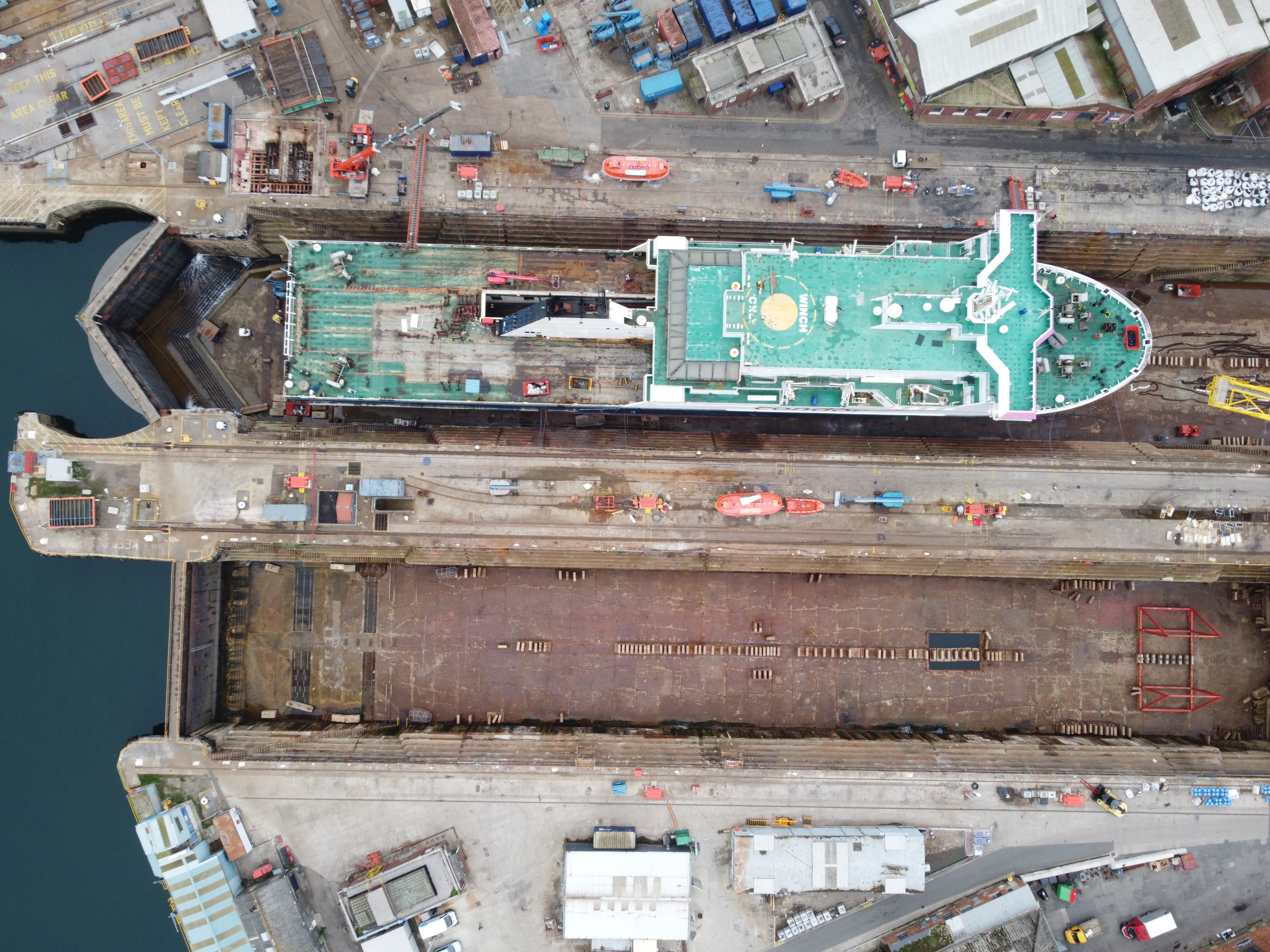
A ship in the dry dock at Falmouth

The Falmouth Docks Company was formed after a meeting in Falmouth Town Hall on 31 May 1858 with the aim of keeping the Packet Service, by providing facilities for the new steam-driven ships. They gained authority to build docks with the passing of the Falmouth Docks and Harbour Act 1859 (22 Vict. c. xvi). James Abernethy, an engineer from Aberdeen was invited to draw up plans on a natural feature known as Bar Point, which extended northwards from Pendennis towards Trefusis Point. The docks was planned covering an area of 150 acres (61 ha). The shallow water was dredged by the Briton and by 1860 a channel of deep water 300 feet (91 m) wide linked the docks with deep water in Carrick Roads. The foundation stone was laid on 28 February 1860 by Lord Falmouth. There is no trace of the stone today. By 1862 No. 1 Graving Dock was built along with a warehouse, known as the grain store, which can still be seen.

The Grain Store built between 1860 and 1862 of killas rubble, rock-faced granite dressings and granite-coped parapet with Delabole slate roof. The interior retains the original cross-beam and joust floor structures. The store was listed as grade II on 23 January 1973 with amendments on 24 April 1996.

Falmouth Docks Act 1864
- Act of Parliament
- Parliament of the United Kingdom
- Long title: An Act for authorizing the Falmouth Docks Company to make and maintain additional Works, and to raise further Monies; and for other Purposes.
- Citation: 27 & 28 Vict. c. cxxvii

Dates
- Royal assent: 30 June 1864

Other legislation
- Repealed by: Falmouth Docks Act 1959

Status: Repealed

Text of statute as originally enacted

The Falmouth Dock Company had its own railway from January 1864 which connected it with the Cornwall Railway that had opened from Truro the previous year. The Eastern Breakwater was built in 1863 and No 2. Dock opened in 1864. Its first cargo to be exported was china clay brought on trains along the new railway. The original rail was 7 ft 1/4 in (2,140 mm) broad gauge, being converted to 4 ft 8 1/2 in (1,435 mm) standard gauge in 1892.

The directors originally borrowed £50,000 from the Public Works Loan Commissioners at 3.25% and had to borrow a further £20,000 in 1864. In the following year the Western Breakwater collapsed and disappeared from sight, and on 11 May 1866 (on a day known as Black Friday or the Panic of 1866) the Bank of England increased interest rates to 10%. Work on the docks was suspended. The Eastern Breakwater was damaged during a "hurricane" in January 1867 and in March of the same year the crew abandoned the brig Uhla which dragged along the same breakwater displacing many piles. By the end of the year the directors handed over possession to the Public Works Loans Commissioners. The breakwater was repaired for £8,500 in 1869. In 1882 the sea bed alongside the Eastern Pier and the Western Wharf was dredged in preparation for an anticipated increase in large steam traffic and a decrease in sail. The following year the 500 feet (150 m) No. 2 dry dock was due for completion and a 30-ton crane was proposed for the 400 feet (120 m) Western Wharf.

In the early days the dock was run in a similar fashion to an industrial estate with many different individuals and organisations hiring the facilities. The Docks, Foundry and Engineering Company (renamed Cox and Co. in 1871) carried out ship-repairs and the fishing fleet from Lowestoft landed its catch on the beach. Much of Cornwall's grain was imported and distributed from the dock and there was also salvage operations, ship refuelling, coal and timber imports. The British and Irish Steam Packet Company ran a regular service from Dublin to London landing at Falmouth on the Eastern Breakwater.

Falmouth Docks Act 1874
- Act of Parliament
- Parliament of the United Kingdom
- Long title: An Act to authorise the Falmouth Docks Company to complete parts of their Undertaking; to make and maintain additional works, and to raise further moneys; and for other purposes.
- Citation: 37 & 38 Vict. c. clxxviii

Dates
- Royal assent: 30 July 1874

Other legislation
- Repealed by: Falmouth Docks Act 1959

Status: Repealed

Text of statute as originally enacted

The Admiralty took over the docks during the First World War and built No. 3 Dock, which was larger than the previous two. Due to the German submarine offensive, ship-repair was of enormous strategic importance but the facilities and workforce was unable to deal with the added workload. A London firm of ship-repairers R. H. Green and Silley Weir sent men to help clear the backlog and their managing director realising the potential of Falmouth bought the dockyard in 1918. Under a new name of Silley Cox and Co., new workshops were built, new machinery installed and skilled workman imported from London.

Falmouth Docks Act 1919
- Act of Parliament
- Parliament of the United Kingdom
- Long title: An Act to authorise the Falmouth Docks Company to make additional works and to raise further capital and for other purposes.
- Citation: 9 & 10 Geo. 5. c. xxxvii

Dates
- Royal assent: 31 July 1919

Other legislation
- Repealed by: Falmouth Docks Act 1921

Status: Repealed

Text of statute as originally enacted

Falmouth Docks Act 1921
- Act of Parliament
- Parliament of the United Kingdom
- Long title: An Act to confer further powers on the Falmouth Docks Company; to change the name of the Company; and for other purposes.
- Citation: 11 & 12 Geo. 5. c. xxiii

Dates
- Royal assent: 1 July 1921

Other legislation
- Repealed by: Falmouth Docks Act 1959

Status: Repealed

The company was renamed by the Falmouth Docks Act 1921 (11 & 12 Geo. 5. c. xxiii), becoming the Falmouth Docks and Engineering Company. Shipbuilding was a major activity until the 1920s, by which time 198 vessels had been built. A fourth dock was opened in 1928 and new wharves built on the western side of the Western Breakwater. They were Empire (1931–33), King's (1935–37) and Queen's (1938–42). The largest dry dock is the enlarged No. 2 Dock, renamed Queen Elizabeth Dock, which was opened, by the Duke of Edinburgh in 1958. This new dock was 850 feet (260 m) in length and able to take the largest ship, then built, at 85,000 tons.

Falmouth Docks Act 1926
- Act of Parliament
- Parliament of the United Kingdom
- Long title: An Act to authorise the Falmouth Docks and Engineering Company to construct a new dry dock and for other purposes.
- Citation: 16 & 17 Geo. 5. c. xliii

Dates
- Royal assent: 15 July 1926

Other legislation
- Repealed by: Falmouth Docks Act 1959

Status: Repealed

Text of statute as originally enacted

Falmouth Docks Act 1949
- Act of Parliament
- Parliament of the United Kingdom
- Long title: An Act to authorise the Falmouth Docks and Engineering Company to construct a new quay to confer further powers upon the Company and for other purposes.
- Citation: 12, 13 & 14 Geo. 6. c. xxxv

Dates
- Royal assent: 30 July 1949

Other legislation
- Repealed by: Falmouth Docks Act 1959

Status: Repealed

Text of statute as originally enacted

Falmouth Docks Act 1954
- Act of Parliament
- Parliament of the United Kingdom
- Long title: An Act to extend the time for the construction of a new quay by the Falmouth Docks and Engineering Company; and for other purposes.
- Citation: 2 & 3 Eliz. 2. c. xv

Dates
- Royal assent: 4 June 1954

Other legislation
- Repealed by: Falmouth Docks Act 1959

Status: Repealed

Falmouth Docks Act 1958
- Act of Parliament
- Parliament of the United Kingdom
- Long title: An Act to authorise the raising of additional capital by the Falmouth Docks and Engineering Company and for other purposes.
- Citation: 6 & 7 Eliz. 2. c. xliii

Dates
- Royal assent: 1 August 1958

Other legislation
- Repealed by: Falmouth Docks Act 1959

Status: Repealed

Text of statute as originally enacted

Falmouth Docks Act 1959
- Act of Parliament
- Parliament of the United Kingdom
- Long title: An Act to consolidate with amendments the statutory powers of the Falmouth Docks and Engineering Company to confer further powers upon the Company and for other purposes.
- Citation: 7 & 8 Eliz. 2. c. xl

Dates
- Royal assent: 29 July 1959

Status: Current legislation

Text of statute as originally enacted

In the 21st century the docks have three graving docks with a capacity of 100,00 dwt and wharfage of 2.5 km. Ship repairs, cleaning and the disposal of waste products are among the facilities offered by the seventeen tenants. Pendennis Shipyard relocated to the docks in 1988 and build and repair luxury yachts.

== Sport ==
Falmouth Docks AFC played in the Cornwall Combination League from 1960 to 1985 winning the league in season 1969–70 and losing the league cup final to Porthleven in 1962–63.
