= Falmouth Docks Police =

Police force in the United Kingdom

Falmouth Docks Police is a non-Home Office ports police force whose primary role is security of Falmouth Docks. As of 2007 the constabulary numbered just four constables.

Officers of this constabulary are sworn in as special constables under section 79 of the Harbours, Docks, and Piers Clauses Act 1847. As a result, officers have the full powers of a constable on any land owned by Falmouth Docks & Engineering Company and at any place within one mile of any owned land.

Any serious, major incidents or crime become the responsibility of the local territorial police force, Devon and Cornwall Police.

== Early history ==
The force was created on 19 September 1870, and was known as the 'Falmouth Harbour Police.' George Julyan, the superintendent of the Falmouth Borough Police, was appointed head constable and had four constables in his charge. His salary was £70 per year. The Falmouth municipal authorities frequently found fault with the force and it was suggested on many occasions by the corporation that it should be amalgamated with the borough and county police for cost and efficiency purposes. On 24 November 1876, Superintendent Julyan resigned following an incident with one of the Falmouth magistrates. Having been unable to attend court the previous week, as he was busy dealing with an incident on the quay, Julyan sent a constable in his place which the magistrate found unacceptable. The magistrate lodged a complaint against the superintendent, causing him to step down. On 1 December 1876, Sergeant Martin was promoted to superintendent.

== Recent history ==
The force was renamed 'Falmouth Docks Police' circa 1925 and numbered around nine constables up until the 1990s. At the turn of the century, the incumbent dock sergeant took steps to modernise the force by updating the uniform and equipment, including a small investment in a number of police helmets displaying the force crest. As the Falmouth Docks Police receives no government funding, it is entirely reliant on the finance of the dockyard operator, which now utilises the force as more of a security arm than a fully-fledged constabulary.

== See also ==
- Law enforcement in the United Kingdom
- List of law enforcement agencies in the United Kingdom, Crown Dependencies and British Overseas Territories
