= Falmouth Docks railway station =

Railway station in Cornwall, England

Falmouth Docks
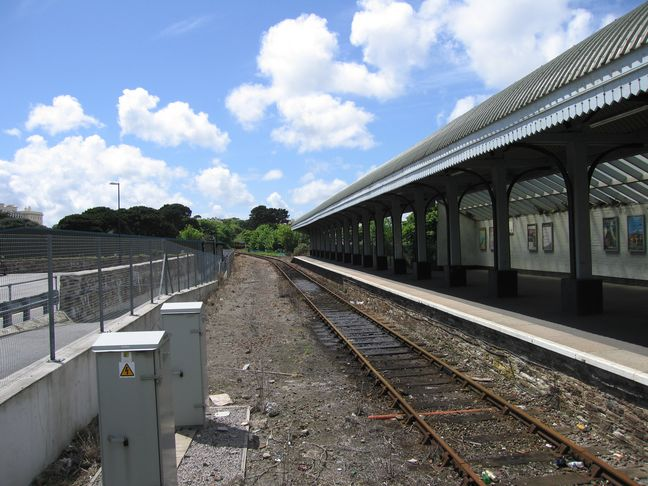
- Looking towards Truro

General information
- Location: Falmouth, Cornwall; England
- Coordinates: 50.1504°N 5.0558°W
- Grid reference: SW817323
- Manager: Great Western Railway
- Platforms: 1

Other information
- Station code: FAL
- Classification: DfT category F1

History
- Original company: Cornwall Railway
- Pre-grouping: Great Western Railway
- Post-grouping: Great Western Railway

Key dates
- 24 August 1863: Opened as Falmouth
- 1 December 1970: Closed
- 5 May 1975: Reopened
- 15 May 1989: Renamed Falmouth Docks

Passengers
- 2021–2022: ▲0.124 million
- 2022–2023: ▼0.123 million
- 2023–2024: ▲0.137 million
- 2024–2025: ▲0.145 million
- 2025–2026: ▼0.139 million
Location

Falmouth Docks railway station is situated in Falmouth, Cornwall, England. It was opened in 1863 as the terminus of the Maritime Line from Truro, although since 1970 Falmouth Town has been the principal station for the town. Services are operated by Great Western Railway, who also manage the station.

== History ==
The original Cornwall Railway Act had provided for a terminus at Falmouth on the waterfront at Greenbank. By the time the line was built the packet ships, which had been the commercial justification for the line, no longer called there. Instead new docks had been constructed near Pendennis Castle to which the railway was diverted. The grand Falmouth Hotel was opened in 1865 just outside the station, with sea views across Gyllyngvase beach. The railway, Falmouth docks and hotel companies shared several directors, the hotel company even leased the refreshment rooms on the station.

The station was constructed out of granite was 200 feet (61 m) long and 90 feet (27 m) wide, the three tracks and two platforms being covered by a train shed. As no other stations were provided in the town at the time it was known just as 'Falmouth', and was opened on 24 August 1863. A large goods shed and a 100 feet (30 m) long engine shed were both provided just outside the station. A siding ran down to the docks from the end of the platform. A camping coach was positioned here by the Western Region from 1962 to 1964.

The need to provide accommodation for all the staff were met by building twenty dwellings, known as Railway Cottages, in four terraces of five dwellings. These are situated just below the station by the entrance to the docks.

The Cornwall Railway was amalgamated into the Great Western Railway on 1 July 1889. The Great Western Railway was nationalised into British Railways from 1 January 1948 which was in turn privatised in the 1990s.

The station was closed on 7 December 1970 when a new station, also named 'Falmouth', was opened 845 metres (924 yd) away and nearer to the town; on 5 May 1975 the latter was renamed 'The Dell' and the 1863 station was reopened under its original name. On 15 May 1989, both were renamed: 'Falmouth' (this station) became 'Falmouth Docks', and 'The Dell' became 'Falmouth Town'. Passengers now have a choice of three stations in the town: Falmouth Docks, Falmouth Town, and Penmere (opened in 1925).

== Location ==
The station is at the south end of the town on the hillside above the docks and near Pendennis Castle and Gyllyngvase Beach. The single platform is on the left hand side of trains arriving from Truro. It is covered by a canopy but features a mosaic panel on its wall which depicts the link between the railway and the area's maritime heritage. It has level access from the car park.

== Passengers ==
Passengers starting or finishing journeys at Falmouth Docks each year generally totalled about 25,000 until 2002 when they started to climb noticeably. By 2011 they were often exceeded 100,000 and in 2024–2025 were 145,458 although they dropped back slightly to 139,288 the following year.

Passengers by year
| Year (Note: The passenger volume data covers twelve month periods that start in April.) | Entries and exits |
|---|---|
| 1997–1998 | 25,055 |
| 1998–1999 | 41,465 (Note: Falmouth had more visitors than usual in 1998, 2014 and 2021 when it hosted Tall Ships Races) |
| 1999–2000 | 27,050 |
| 2000–2001 | 24,913 |
| 2001–2002 | 23,523 |
| 2002–2003 | 28,461 |
| 2003–2004 | No data |
| 2004–2005 | 38,434 |
| 2005–2006 | 47,316 |
| 2006–2007 | 59,542 |
| 2007–2008 | 67,164 |
| 2008–2009 | 85,540 |
| 2009–2010 | 91,890 |
| 2010–2011 | 92,946 |
| 2011–2012 | 104,408 |
| 2012–2013 | 103,542 |
| 2013–2014 | 109,134 |
| 2014–2015 | 137,296 |
| 2015–2016 | 116,478 |
| 2016–2017 | 99,610 |
| 2017–2018 | 97,532 |
| 2018–2019 | 96,726 |
| 2019–2020 | 114,088 |
| 2020–2021 | 38,320 (Note: Travel in 2020 was much reduced due to the COVID-19 pandemic in the United Kingdom) |
| 2021–2022 | 123,554 |
| 2022–2023 | 123,394 |
| 2023–2024 | 136,744 |
| 2024–2025 | 145,458 |
| 2025–2026 | 139,288 |

== Services ==
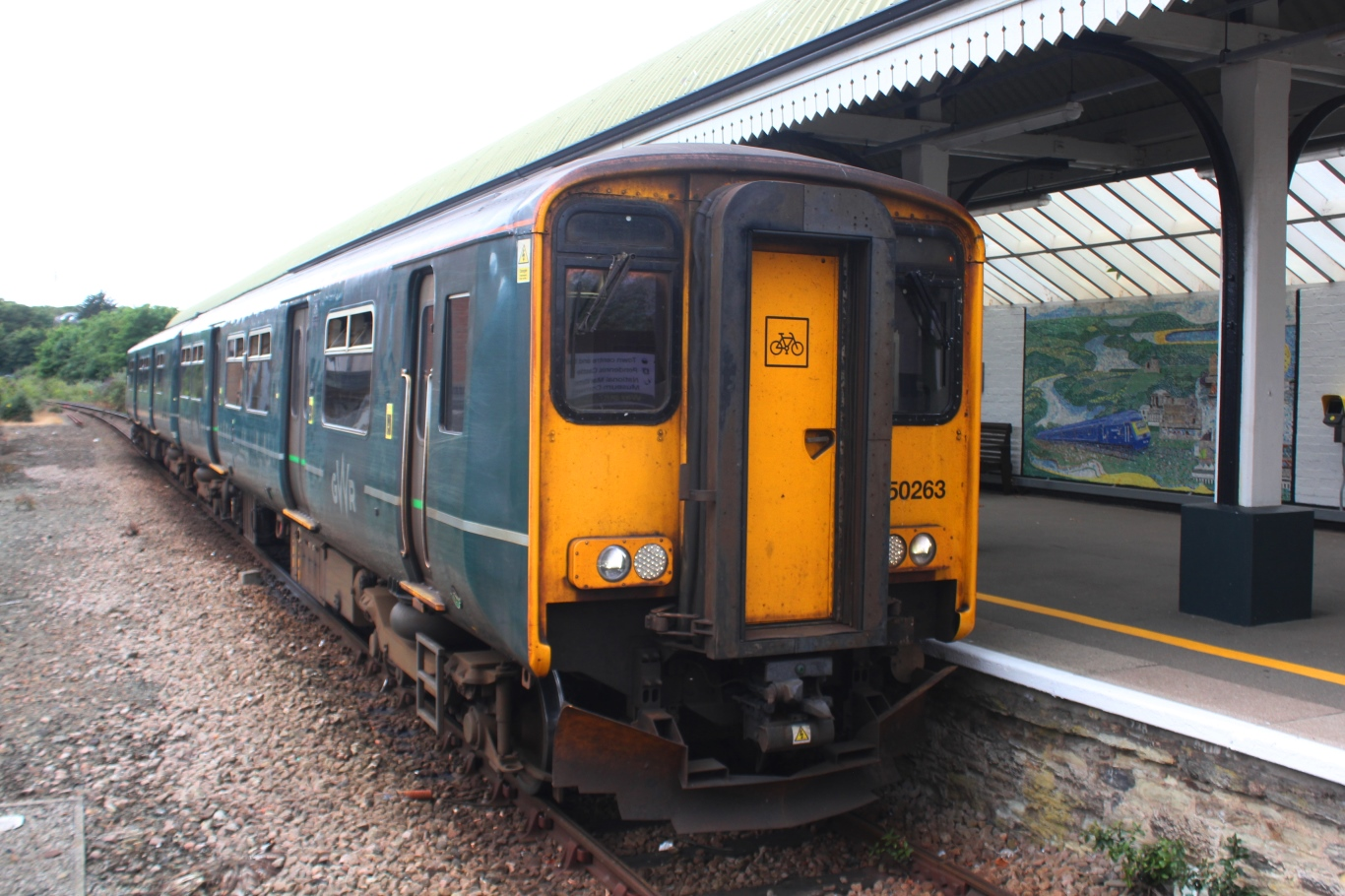
A Class 150 arriving at Falmouth Docks from Truro

All trains are operated by Great Western Railway to and from Truro. Until 2009 they ran approximately once each hour – often much less than this – but they were then increased in frequency. They are now every 30 minutes Monday - Saturday day time and hourly at evenings and on Sundays. This is possible because of the new passing loop at Penryn.

| Preceding station | National Rail | Following station |
|---|---|---|
| Falmouth Town towards Truro | Great Western Railway Maritime Line | Terminus |

== Community Rail ==
The railway from Truro to Falmouth is designated as a community rail line and is supported by marketing provided by the Devon and Cornwall Rail Partnership. The line is promoted under the "Maritime Line" name.

== Notes ==
This station offers access to the South West Coast Path
| Distance to path | 100 yards (91 m) |
| Next station anticlockwise | Falmouth Town; 0.5 miles (0.80 km) |
| Next station clockwise | Penzance 60 miles (97 km) |
