= Carnon viaduct =

Railway viaduct in Cornwall, England

Coordinates: 50.22343°N 5.10619°W

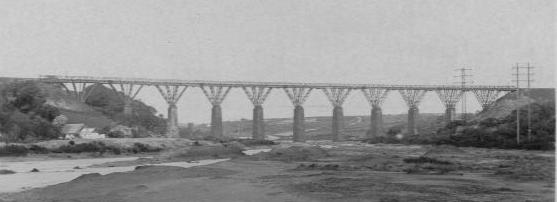
The original timber Carnon Viaduct

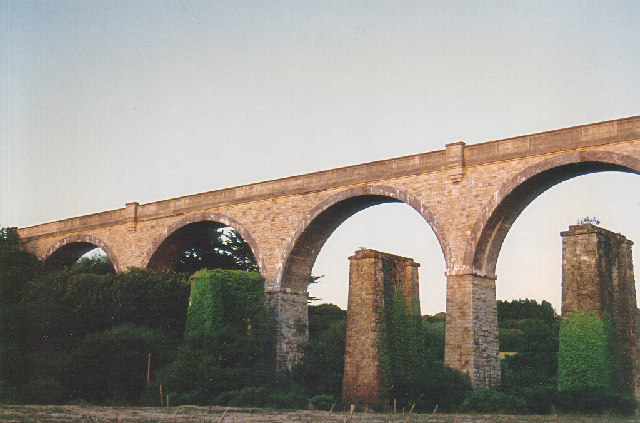
Carnon Viaduct in 1996 with the piers of the former timber viaduct in the foreground

The Carnon viaduct carries a railway line from Truro to Falmouth – now branded the Maritime Line – over the valley of the Carnon River in west Cornwall, United Kingdom. The viaduct is situated half-a-mile (800 metres) northeast of Perranwell station which is five miles (8 km) from the line's terminus at Falmouth and three miles (5 km) from its junction with the Cornish main line at Truro.

The present nine-arch masonry viaduct replaced an earlier 19th-century structure designed by Isambard Kingdom Brunel for the Cornwall Railway. The original viaduct was opened to traffic when the line was extended from Truro to Falmouth in 1863 and had a timber deck supported by timber trestles springing from eleven masonry piers. It was 756 feet (230 m) long and 96 feet (29 m) high.

The present viaduct is of roughly the same dimensions as the original. It was built by A E Farr CIvil Engineers of Westbury for the Great Western Railway as an entirely new structure immediately south of its predecessor and it cost £40,000. It has nine arches and opened to traffic in June 1933. The timberwork of the original structure was dismantled and removed but its masonry piers still stand beside the replacement viaduct.

Construction of the original structure posed specific problems not encountered at the sites of other viaducts in Cornwall. The tidal limit of Restronguet Creek extended further up the Carnon River valley than it does today and at the site of the viaduct the valley floor then consisted of intertidal mudflats and a great quantity of silt washed down from the numerous mines upstream. This soft layer was over 20 feet (6.1 m) thick and "...not an ideal foundation for a 96ft high viaduct."

After exploratory drillings, the engineering contractors sunk cast iron caissons through the silt to the bedrock at each pier location. The cylindrical caissons, 16 feet (4.9 m) in diameter, were then emptied of silt so that masonry footings could be built from the rock up to surface level, pumps being employed to keep the workings dry. This added to the cost of construction but proved entirely satisfactory as Carnon was among the last of the original Cornwall railway viaducts to be replaced.

== See also ==
- Cornwall Railway viaducts
