= Devon and Cornwall Rail Partnership =

Community Rail Partnership for rural passengers

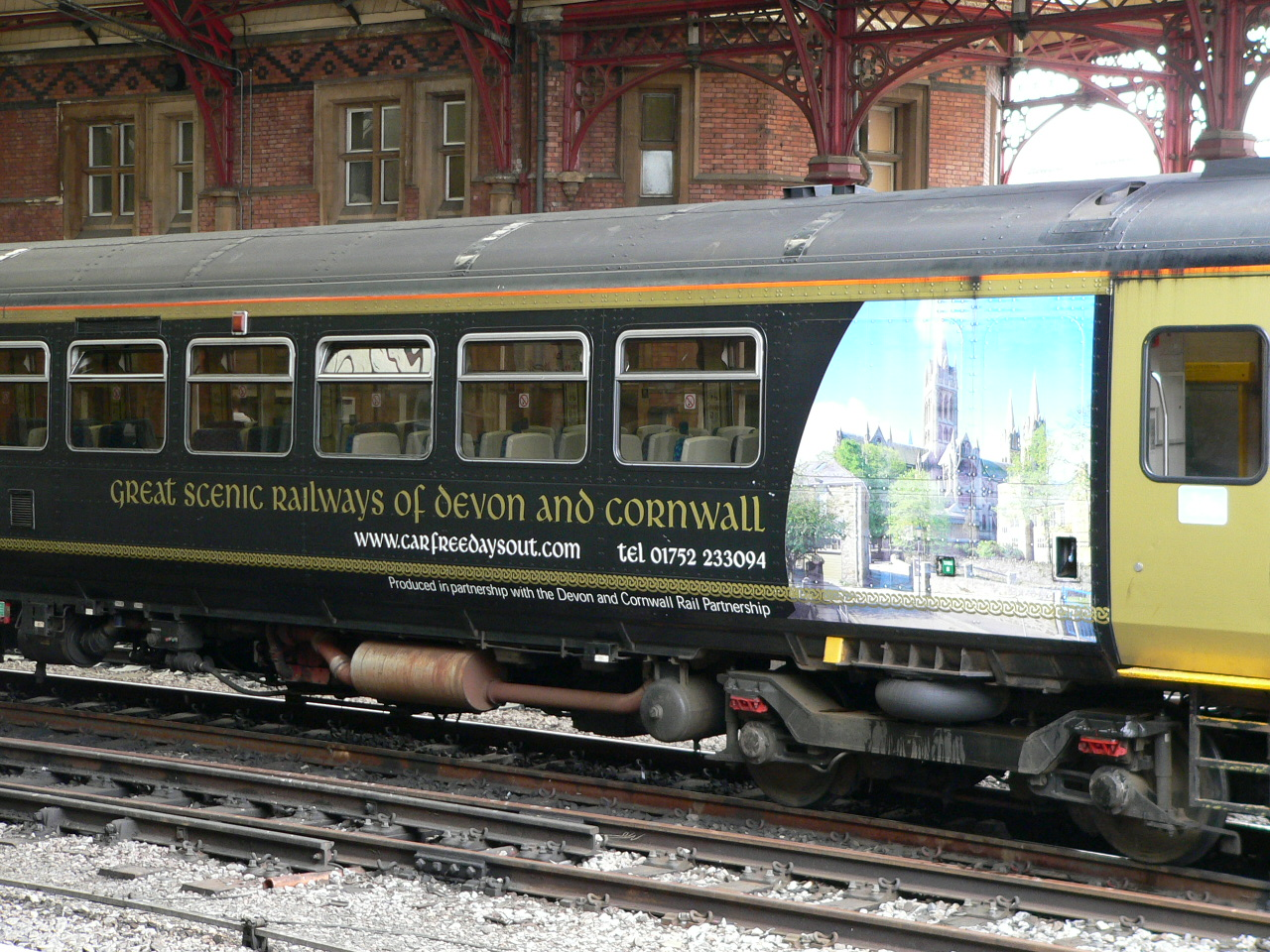
A Class 153 train in the livery of the Devon and Cornwall Rail Partnership

The Devon and Cornwall Rail Partnership (DCRP) is the Community Rail Partnership for rural passenger railways in the counties of Devon and Cornwall in the south west of England.

It was formed in 1991 and its role is to work with local councils and the railway industry to promote branch lines, help deliver improvements, work with communities and other local partners, and support economic growth.

== History ==
British Rail and local councils funded the promotion of the branch lines to Barnstaple and Gunnislake in 1990. This included introducing the names 'Tarka Line' and 'Tamar Valley Line' to create a local identity. The setting up of the DCRP was announced in August 1991 to continue this work and build on its success with other branch lines. The St Ives Bay Line, Looe Valley Line and Tamar Valley Line were included in the first community lines recognised by the Department for Transport in 2005 (there were three other lines considered outside Devon and Cornwall).

Its accreditation with the Department for Transport was renewed in May 2025.

== Organisation ==
The DCRP is based at the University of Plymouth and is backed by Devon County Council, Cornwall Council, and Plymouth City Council. Its railway partners are Great Western Railway, CrossCountry and South Western Railway. The original partner was Wessex Trains but that company lost its franchise to Great Western Railway in 2006.

Some funding comes from other sources such as the Designated Community Rail Development Fund and European Union.

== Promoting branch lines ==
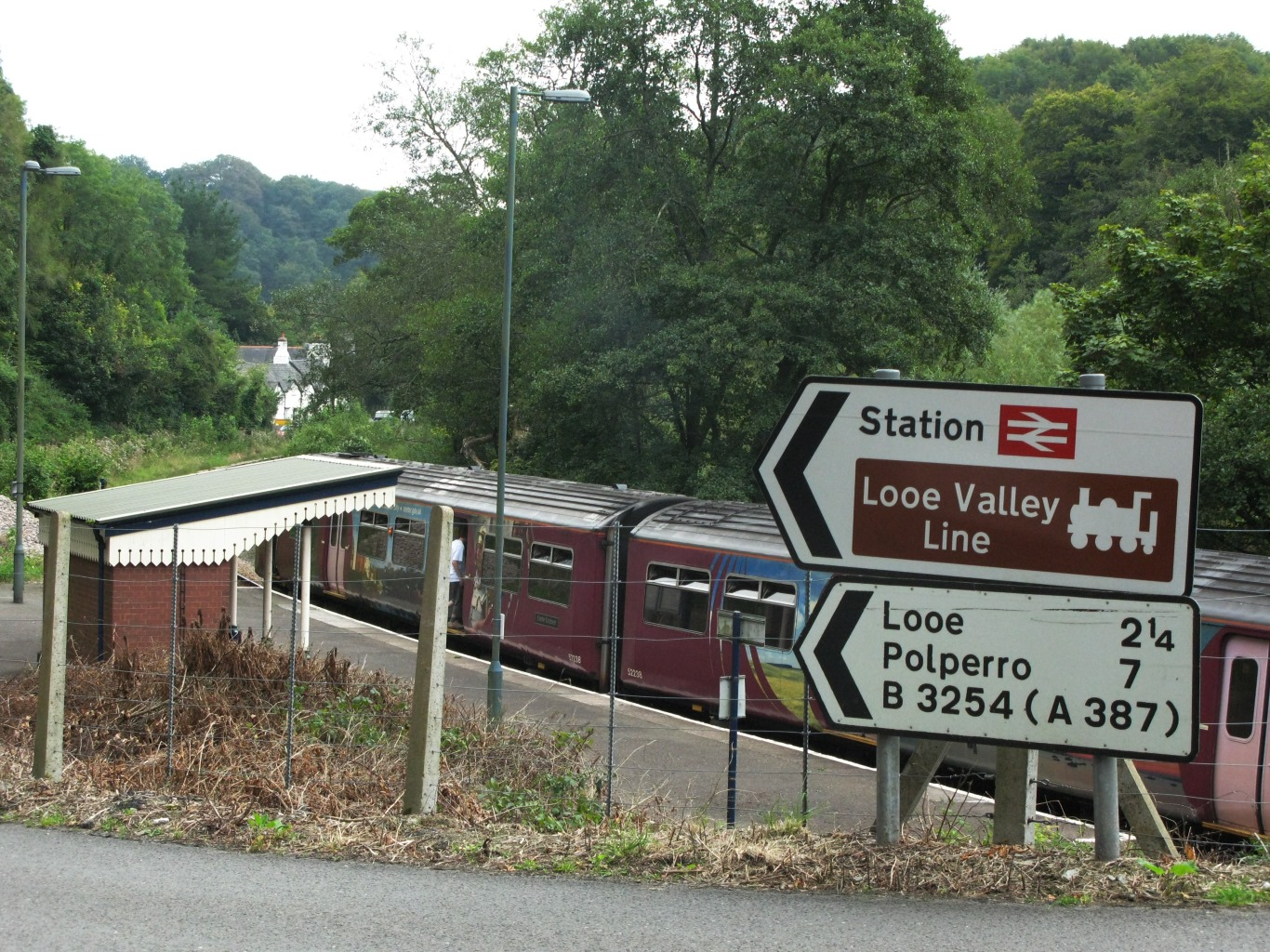
A Looe Valley Line train calls at Sandplace.

There are ten lines promoted by the DCRP:

- Atlantic Coast Line between Par and Newquay
- Dartmoor Line between Exeter Central and Okehampton
- East Devon Line between Exeter St Davids and Axminster (part of the line to London Waterloo)
- Looe Valley Line between Liskeard and Looe
- Maritime Line between Truro and Falmouth Docks
- Riviera Line between Exeter St Davids and Paignton
- St Ives Bay Line between St Erth and St Ives
- Tamar Valley Line between Plymouth and Gunnislake
- Tarka Line between Exeter Central and Barnstaple

In addition, several railway stations have 'friends' groups supported by the partnership and which undertake local promotion of services and take on work such as gardening and litter collection. Although it has supported the Avocet Line Rail Users Group, which is the community group that promotes the Avocet Line between Exeter St Davids and Exmouth, the line is not actively promoted by the DCRP.

The DCRP produced publicity for the branch lines such as 'Line Leisure Guides'.

The DCRP manages carnet schemes on some lines which allows books of train tickets to be sold in local shops. In 2011 one person in four was using these carnets on some routes.

The DCRP developed the concept of the rail ale trail which promote visits to pubs by train. The first trail was on the Tarka Line in 2002 which they developed with the Campaign for Real Ale (CAMRA). The concept spread to other lines in Devon and Cornwall, and to other parts of the country. By 2010 there were trails on the Atlantic Coast, Looe Valley, Maritime, St Ives Bay, Tamar, and Tarka lines Trails are publicised on a special website and by printed leaflets and participants could claim special souvenirs including T-shirts.

== Improvements ==
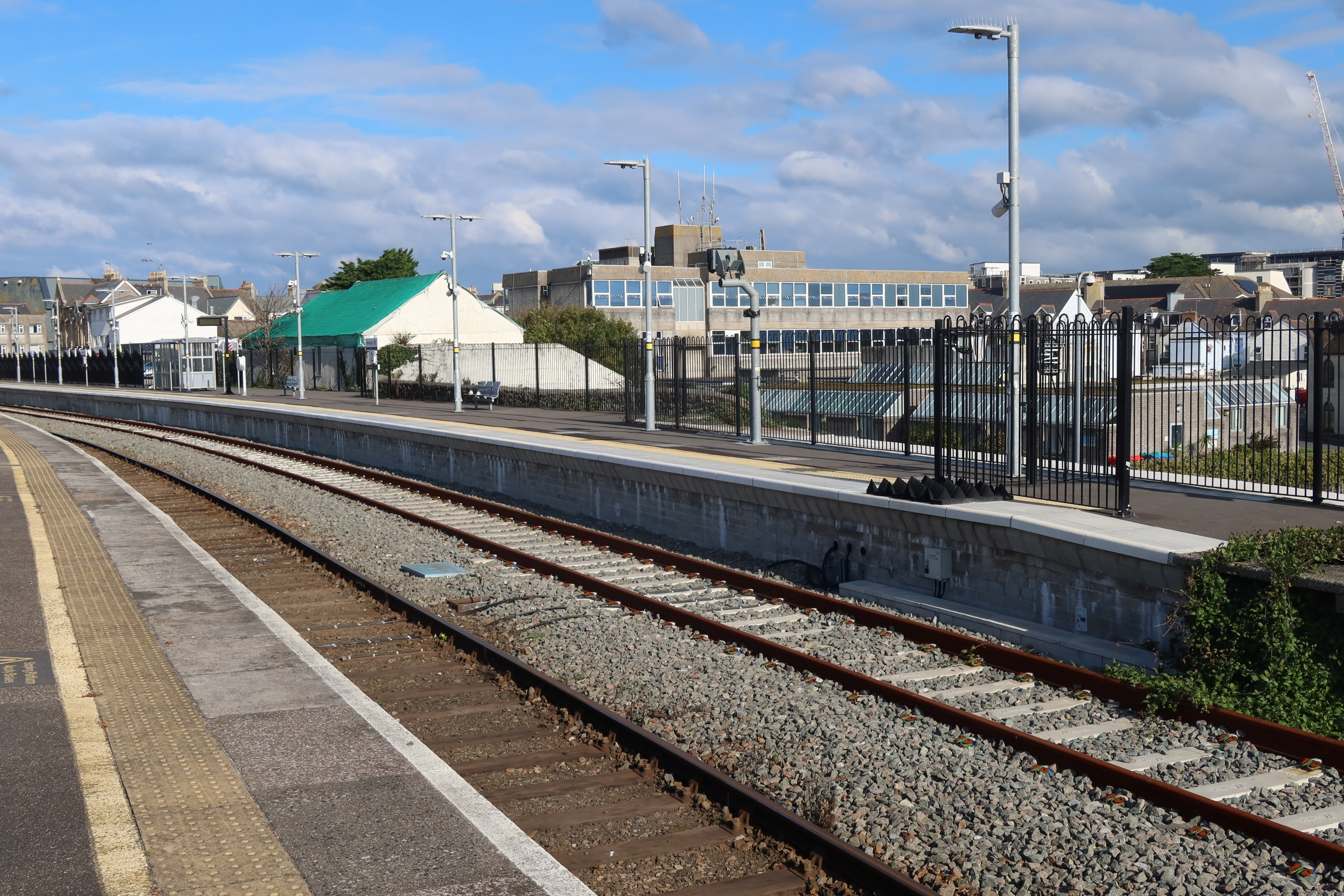
The second platform at Newquay was restored to allow extra trains to operate in 2026.

The Partnership has secured additional investment to improve services on the branch lines over the years.

The additional services funded have included:

- Sunday services on the Tamar Valley Line and the Maritime Line throughout the year, whereas previously they had run just in the peak summer
- Summer Sunday services on the Atlantic Coast and Looe Valley lines
- Extra trains on the Atlantic Coast and Tarka lines.
- Additional weekday trains on the Atlantic Coast Line in 2004 - the line's best train service for many years.
- Station improvements on the Atlantic Coast, Looe Valley, Tamar Valley, and Tarka lines, and also a summertime ticket office at Looe station.

All in all, the investment and promotion has seen passenger numbers on all of the branch lines (excluding the East Devon Line) double since 2001.

£392,000 of grants were secured by the local authority for improvements to stations on the St Ives Bay Line and at Penzance in 1998. Further work was done at St Ives in 2004, a year before the line was designated as a community railway. The number of passengers carried on the line doubled by 2009 compared to 2004.

The passing loop opened in 2009 at Penryn on the Maritime Line was the first loop to be installed on a community rail line. It allowed the service frequency to be doubled in an effort to bring economic improvements to the area. The DCRP investigated the travel patterns on the Tamar Valley Line at this time and discovered that a three-hour gap in services was preventing people from travelling so one extra service was added which GWR credited with giving 'quite a hefty chunk of (additional passenger) volume in the first year'. There was a 19% increase in passenger volume across GWR's community lines in 2009 and 6% in 2010 (this includes those outside Devon and Cornwall).

The Dartmoor Line was reopened on 20 November 2021 and the DCRP included it in the branch lines they promote, including as an access point to Dartmoor National Park. At Okehampton, the terminus, the DCRP work with the Dartmoor Railway Association to care for the building. The DCRP is keen to see a study into the reopening of the line from Bere Alston to Tavistock line which is another part of the same route as Okehampton that was closed in 1968.

Another passing loop was brought into use in 2026 on the Atlantic Coast Line to allow an hourly service to operate along with through trains from London, along with the restoration of a second platform at Newquay. 726 additional passengers were carried during the first week of the enhanced train service.

== Wessex Trains special liveries ==
Wessex Trains, the company that operated local services until 2006, gave special liveries to some of their Class 150 and Class 153 diesel multiple units to promote the lines in the Partnership. They worked not just in Devon and Cornwall but further afield too and so could be seen at places such as Southampton Central, Cardiff Central, and Bristol Temple Meads. Most continued to work for Great Western Railway but from 2007 they were all either repainted into that company's livery or taken off lease and transferred to other operators.

Number and name	Colour	Promoting	Image
150233 Lady Margaret of Looe Valley	Maroon	Looe Valley Line	
150240 The Tamar Kingfisher	Maroon	Tamar Valley Line	
150241 The Tarka Belle	Maroon	Tarka Line	
150253 The Exmouth Avocet	Maroon	Avocet Line	
150261 The Riviera Flyer	Maroon	Riviera Line	
150265 The Maritime Line	Maroon	Maritime Line	
153302	Black	Devon and Cornwall Rail Partnership	
153308	Black	Devon and Cornwall Rail Partnership	
153329 St Ives Bay Line	Blue	St Ives Bay Line	
153369 The Looe Valley Explorer	Blue	Looe Valley Line	
153374	Black	Devon and Cornwall Rail Partnership	
153377	Black	Devon and Cornwall Rail Partnership	
153380	Black	Devon and Cornwall Rail Partnership	
153382	Black	Devon and Cornwall Rail Partnership	

== See also ==
- List of ACoRP members
