= Truro railway station =

Railway station in Cornwall, England

Truro Truru
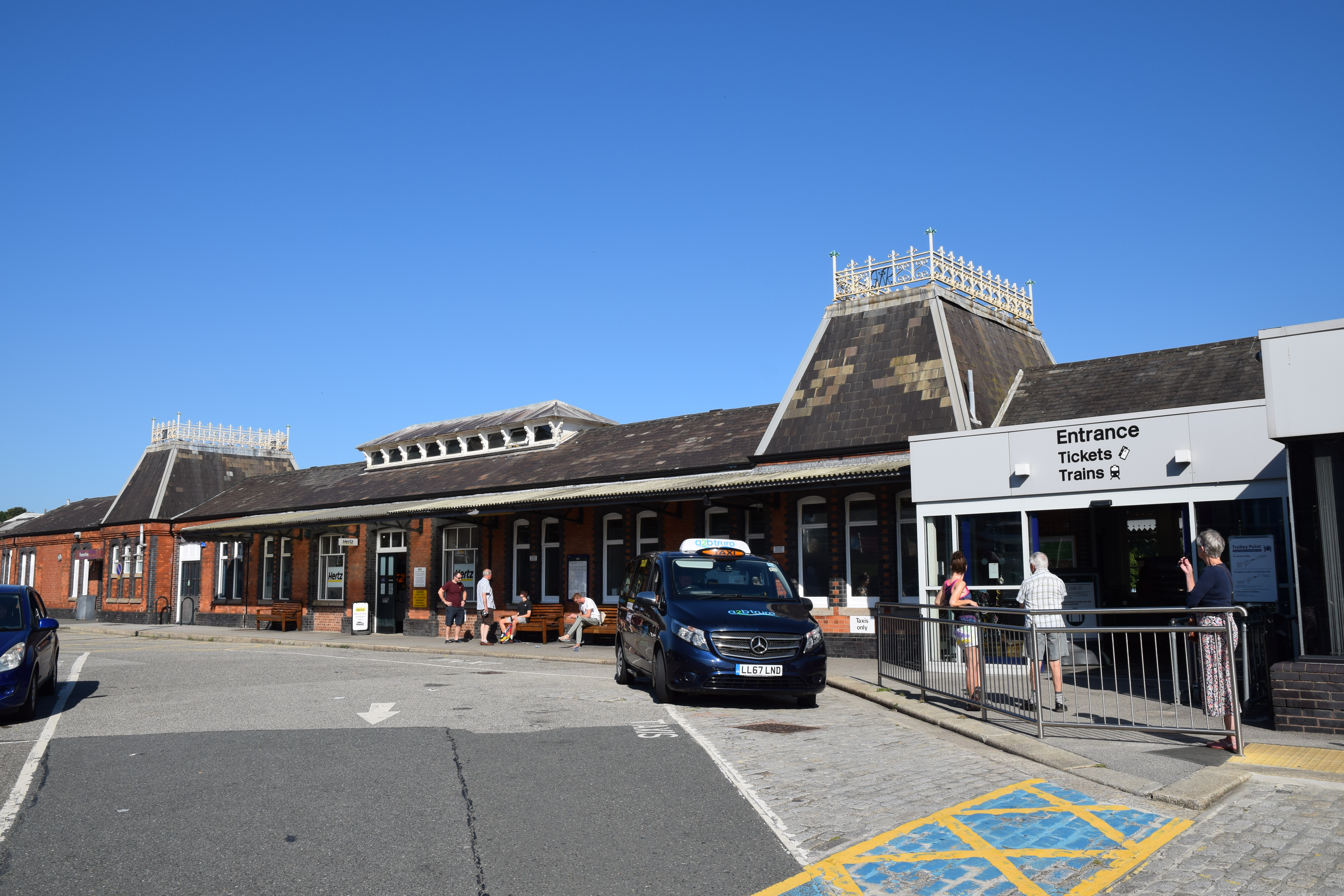

General information
- Location: Truro, Cornwall, England
- Coordinates: 50°15′50″N 5°03′52″W
- Grid reference: SW817449
- Manager: Great Western Railway
- Platforms: 3

Other information
- Station code: TRU
- Classification: DfT category C1

History
- Original company: Cornwall Railway, West Cornwall Railway
- Pre-grouping: Great Western Railway
- Post-grouping: Great Western Railway

Key dates
- Opened: 1859
- Line to Falmouth: 1863

Passengers
- 2021/22: ▲1.049 million
- Interchange: ▲0.215 million
- 2022/23: ▲1.101 million
- Interchange: ▲0.241 million
- 2023/24: ▲1.188 million
- Interchange: ▲0.255 million
- 2024/25: ▲1.335 million
- Interchange: ▲0.283 million
- 2025/26: ▲1.396 million
- Interchange: ▲0.294 million
Location
Notes
- Passenger statistics from the Office of Rail and Road

Truro railway station (Cornish: Truru) serves the city of Truro, in Cornwall, England. The station lies on the Cornish Main Line from Plymouth to Penzance; it is also the junction for the Maritime Line to Falmouth Docks and the busiest station in Cornwall. It is situated at milepost 300.75 miles (484.01 km) from London Paddington, measured via Bristol Temple Meads, although most trains use the shorter route via Newbury. The station is managed by Great Western Railway, which serves the station alongside CrossCountry.

== History ==
The station opened with the Cornwall Railway on 4 May 1859, when it was very different from today. A train shed roofed over the space between the two platforms and the level crossing was much busier and at the other end of the building, where the branch platform is today. A contemporary report tells us that:

the passenger station here is a handsome stone building, one hundred and thirty feet long, with large projecting roof; and containing in the centre of the building a spacious booking office, having separate entrances for first, second and third class passengers. On each side of this are comfortable first and second class waiting rooms, parcels' room, superintendent's office, and the other conveniences of a first class station. Inside the station is the passenger platform, one hundred and sixty-one feet long by fourteen feet wide, and beyond this three lines of broad gauge rails. Then the arrival platform, which is of the same length of that on the opposite side, and twenty feet wide. The whole of the space occupied by these rails and platforms are covered by a double roof, of the respective spans of fifty-seven and forty-one feet, with iron tie and suspension rods on a novel principle. The light, airy and forceful appearance of these roofs has excited the admiration of every person who has viewed them.

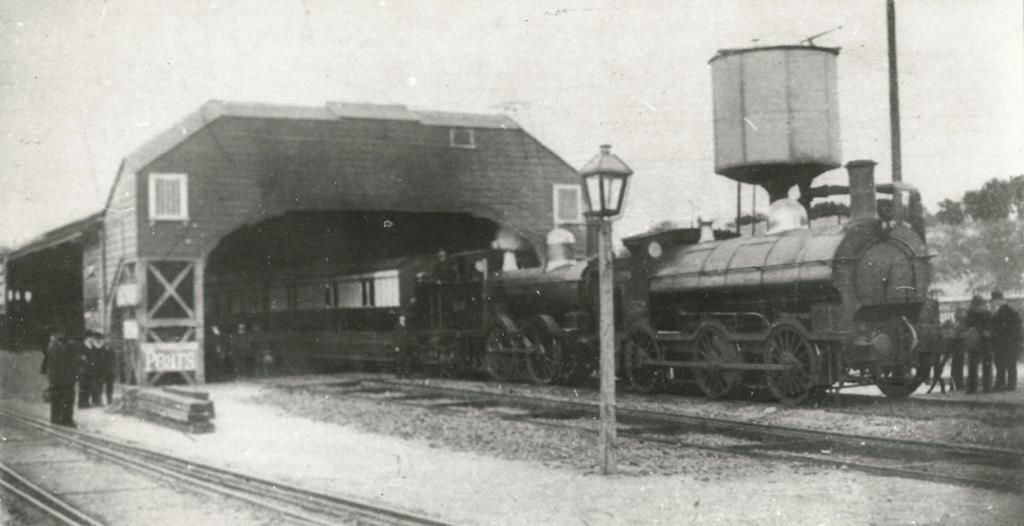
The last broad gauge train to Penzance calls at Truro in 1892

A stone goods shed was built in front of the station and an engine shed beyond the passenger platforms: "one hundred feet long, and forty-five feet wide, with double line of rails, and accommodation for six engines. Outside of the latter building are a smithery and workmen's shops, in which any casual repairs that may be required, can be executed. This building being erected on 'made ground' is constructed of timber, as being lighter than stone".

The West Cornwall Railway shared the station, which was managed by joint committee of the two railways. This line came from Penzance through the tunnel, but was only standard gauge until 1 March 1867, when it had a third rail laid to allow both broad gauge and standard gauge trains (the rail had actually been laid the previous year but was only used for goods trains for a while). In the meantime the Cornwall Railway had extended its rails to Falmouth. The West Cornwall Railway kept its station at Newham Quay to handle goods traffic to the town (Note: Truro did not become a city until 1877.) and waterfront; the branch crossed the Falmouth line on the level just beyond Highertown Tunnel at Penwithers Junction.

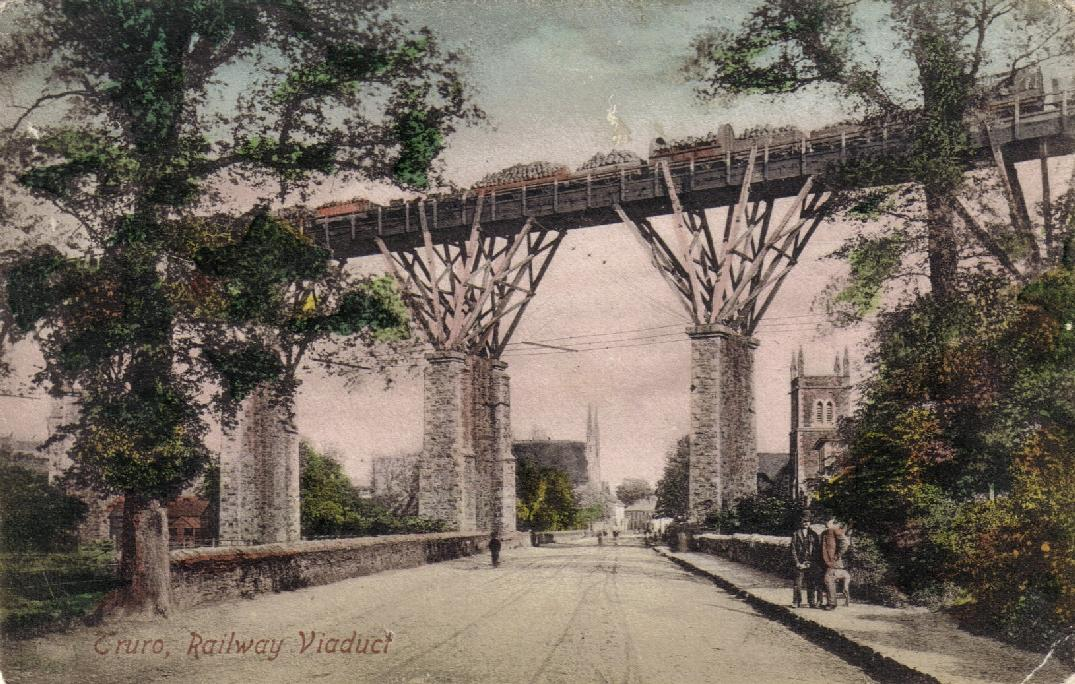
Carvedras Viaduct

Two of Brunel's timber viaducts carried the line high above the town. Immediately outside the station was Carvedras Viaduct, 86 feet (26 m) above St George's Road and 969 feet (295 m) long. After passing the site of the castle, the line then passed over Truro Viaduct which, with 20 stone piers, stretched to 1,329 feet (405 m) and was the longest viaduct in Cornwall, although it was only 92 feet (28 m) high. They were replaced with stone viaducts in 1902 and 1904 respectively, although the original piers still stand.

The Cornwall Railway was amalgamated into the Great Western Railway on 1 July 1889.

The goods shed was rebuilt quite early on, to accommodate the heavy traffic handled. The passenger station was rebuilt in 1897 when the roof was removed, new buildings were provided, a new engine shed was built nearer the tunnel and the level crossing was removed to the east end. It was at this time that a third footbridge was added across the station, in place of the level crossing; access to this was from the road rather than the platforms.

From 2 January 1905, the station was also used as the terminus of the branch to Perranporth and Newquay, although the actual junction was at Chacewater.

The Great Western Railway was nationalised into British Railways on 1 January 1948.

Preceding station	Historical railways	Following station
	Services in 1863	
Grampound Road	Cornwall Railway	Perranwell
Terminus	West Cornwall Railway	Chacewater
	Services in 1908	
Probus and Ladock Halt	GWR; Cornish Main Line	Chacewater
Terminus	GWR; Truro & Newquay line	Chacewater
Terminus	GWR; Falmouth branch	Perranwell

== Description ==
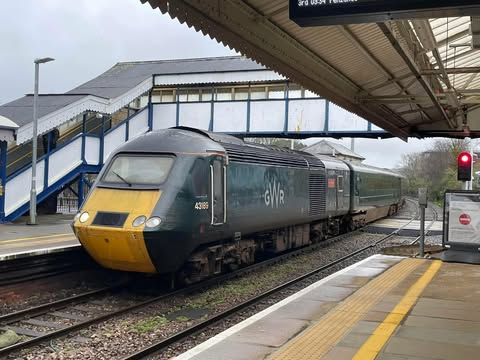
A GWR Castle set arrives on a service for Penzance, having used the new crossover at the east end of the station

Truro station is 300 miles 63 chains (300.79 mi; 484.1 km) from London Paddington, measured on the historical route via Box and Plymouth Millbay.

The station has three platforms:

- Platform 1 for trains to Falmouth Docks
- Platform 2 for down trains towards St Erth and Penzance
- Platform 3 for up trains towards Plymouth, Exeter St Davids and London Paddington.

The main entrance to the brick-built station is on the south side of the line, leading directly to platform 2. The station cafe is along this platform on the left and platform 1 (bay platform) used for trains to Falmouth is beyond this. Platform 3 has a passenger lounge with snack and drink facilities for use by customers holding a first-class ticket and there are also shower facilities in this lounge for customers holding a cabin ticket for the Night Riviera sleeper service. The long-stay car park is situated behind this platform, with access being over the level crossing at the east end of the station. There are ticket barriers in operation at the station.

Platform 3 can be reached by two footbridges, one at either end of the station; step-free access to this platform is from the level crossing. It is a bi-directional platform and any trains arriving from the east and heading west towards Penzance are able to use platform 3 if required operationally. This also means that any trains arriving in on platform 3 from the east can terminate to head back east again if they are needed to do so and this was all made possible by installation of a new crossover at the east end of the station, which was installed during the re-signalling works in 2024. This crossover was an addition to the already installed crossover at the west end of the station, allowing platform 3 to be fully bi-directional.

Trains to and from Falmouth Docks are also able to use platform 3 if required too, although the re-signalling work has also made it possible for them to arrive in and depart from platform 2. This is normal practice now if platform 1 is occupied and a cancellation occurs while the half-hourly service is still in place.

The sidings on the north side of the station remain available for goods trains when needed.

== Services ==
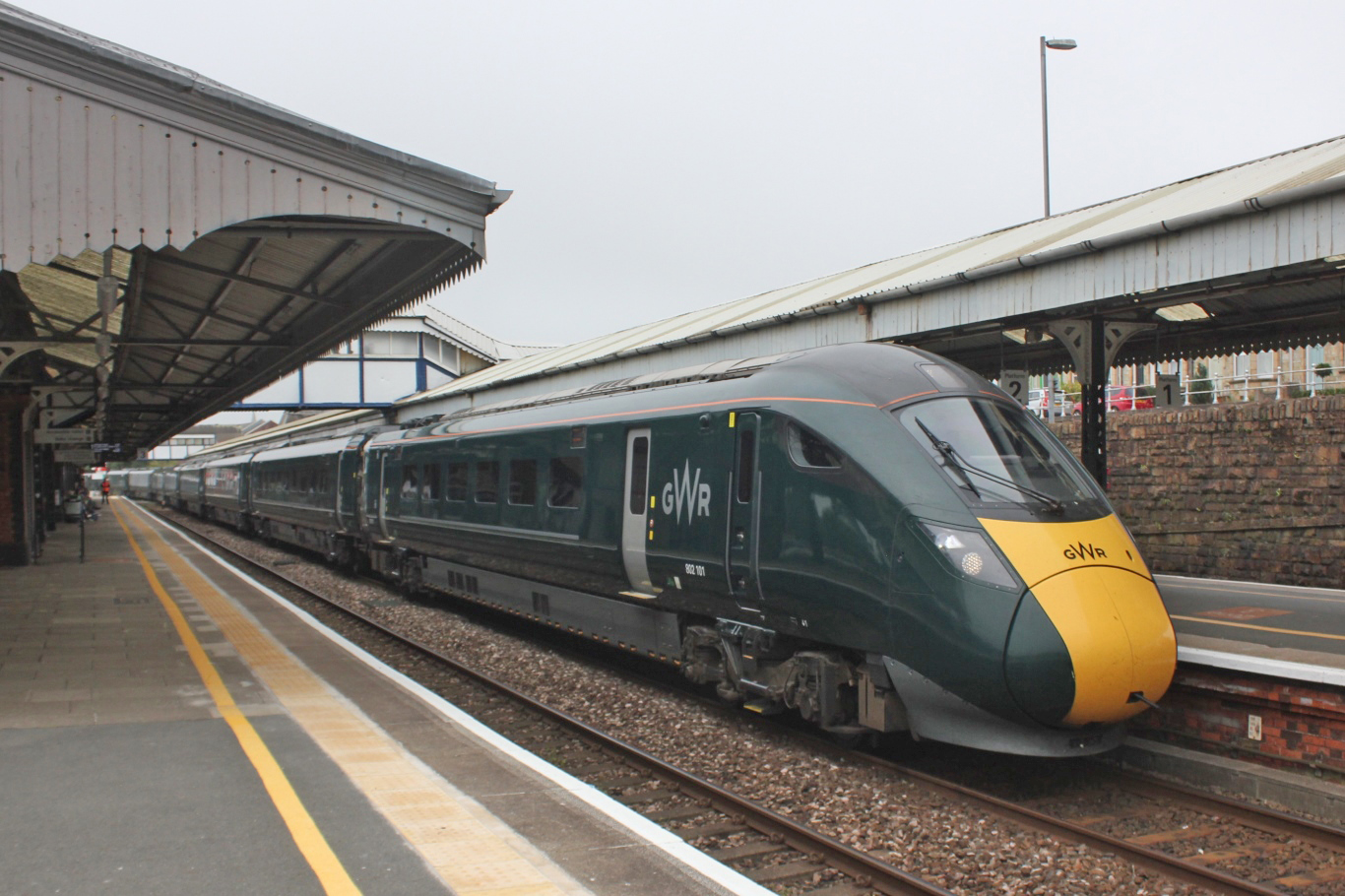
A Class 802 on a service to Penzance

Truro is served by two train operating companies, which provide the following general off-peak service pattern in trains per hour/day (tph/tpd):

Great Western Railway

- 2 tph to Penzance
- 2 tph to Plymouth; of which:
  - 1 tp2h continues to Exeter St Davids
  - 1 tp2h continues to London Paddington, via Exeter St Davids, Taunton and Reading
- 2 tph to Falmouth Docks, on the Maritime Line.

The Night Riviera sleeper:

- 1 tpd to Penzance
- 1 tpd to London Paddington.

CrossCountry:

- 2 tpd to Penzance (3 tpd on a Sunday)
- 1 tpd to Edinburgh Waverley, via Bristol Temple Meads, Birmingham New Street, Leeds and York
- 1 tpd to Birmingham New Street (to Bristol Temple Meads on a Saturday and Plymouth on a Sunday)

Preceding station	National Rail	Following station
Redruth	Great Western Railway; Cornish Main Line	St Austell
Redruth	CrossCountry; Cornish Main Line	St Austell
Perranwell towards	Great Western Railway Maritime Line	Terminus

== Signalling ==
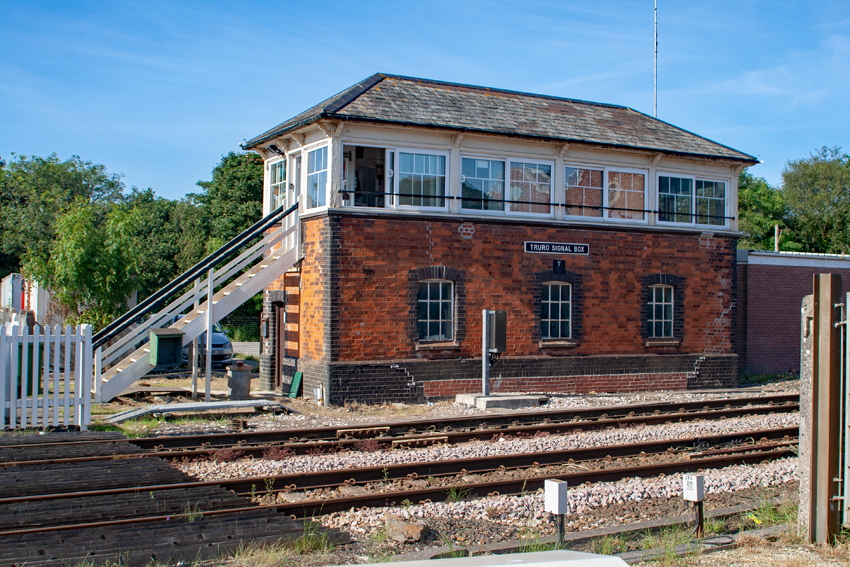
Truro signal box, formerly Truro East box

Signal boxes had been built to control the complex layout at Truro by 1880. These were replaced by new Type 7A signal boxes: West in 1897 and East in 1899. The West box, which was situated on the north side of the line near to the entrance to the engine shed, was closed on 7 November 1971 when the East box, situated on the same side of the line just east of the level crossing, was renamed to simply Truro.

In May 2009, the Falmouth branch was resignalled and a loop installed at Penryn, which was controlled from the signal box at Truro. During 2023-2024, resignalling works were done to replace the semaphore signals with color-light signals at the station. Following the commissioning of this, the station and branch signalling is now controlled from the new Mid-Cornwall Workstation at Exeter Panel Signal Box. Mid-Cornwall also now operates the signalling in areas formerly controlled by Par signal box and Lostwithiel signal box.

The adjacent operational signal boxes are now at Liskeard to the east and at Roskear Junction near Camborne to the west.

The final stages of the resignalling works meant that Truro signal box closed in the early hours of 27 February 2024, though the building remains today.
