= St Dennis Junction =

Railway junction in Cornwall, England

Coordinates: 50.38324°N 4.88887°W

St Dennis Junction was in St Dennis, Cornwall.

== 1849–1960 ==
The history of railway lines through the Cornish village of St. Dennis dates back as far as 1849. In that year, a tramway was opened linking the harbour in Newquay to areas where clay was – and still is – mined. This railway ran from Newquay, through the localities of Quintrell Downs, St Columb Road and St. Dennis.

On 14 July 1864 an act of parliament was obtained for the Newquay and Cornwall Junction Railway. Construction proved to be easier said than done and the 3.5 miles (5.6 km) of 7 ft (2,134 mm) broad gauge railway from the main line at Burngullow up to Nanpean finally opened on 1 July 1869.

Upon the opening of the Cornwall Minerals Railway line from Par to St Columb Road on 1 January 1879 it became possible for trains of china clay to travel to the harbours at Par Docks and Fowey for onward shipping. At the same time, the old tramway from Newquay was rebuilt and extended to meet up with the line already at Nanpean.

On 23 May 1892 the line south of Nanpean was converted to the 4 ft 8 1/2 in (1,435 mm) standard gauge used. Goods trains could now run through from St Dennis to Burngullow (although the line has never carried scheduled passenger trains).

The section of railway from Parkandillick (just south of St. Dennis) up to St. Dennis Junction closed in 1960. The track over this stretch (Parkandillick – St. Dennis Junction) was then lifted. All that remains at St. Dennis is an overgrown railway cutting plus a platform with fencing on it.

It is worth noting here that the name "St. Dennis Junction" describes the next destination from the junction as is customary on British railways. It is some way north of St. Dennis, nearer to the areas of St. Columb Road, Indian Queens and Toldish.

== 1960 – present ==
Since the link to the Par – Newquay railway was cut in 1960, the line from Burngullow up to Parkandillack (just south of St. Dennis) has remained open for freight.

In 1986 a proposal was put forward, the terms of which would have been, as far as the railways were concerned:

- to close the railway line between Par and St. Columb Road to passenger traffic;
- in relation to (a) the stations at Roche, Bugle and Luxulyan would also have closed;
- to reopen the link between St. Dennis Junction and St. Dennis in order to once again give a through route between St. Austell and St. Dennis;

This proposal did not progress. In their 2001-2006 Cornwall Local Transport Plan (CLTP hereafter) it was proposed to reignite this scheme with additions. The proposals of the 2001-06 CLTP scheme were:

- to close the railway line between Par and St. Columb Road to passenger traffic;
- as a consequence, the stations at Roche, Bugle and Luxulyan would also have closed;
- to reopen the link between St. Dennis Junction and St. Dennis in order to once again give a through route between St Austell and St. Dennis;
- potential release of the section of rail next to the A30 at Goss Moor for expansion of the road or development of a nature reserve;
- to provide direct links for students (of St Austell College) and commuters between St. Austell and Newquay;
- potential for extra rail stops between Burngullow and St. Dennis;
- possible improved tourism for the Eden Project, Cornish Riviera and, of course, Newquay.

What became of the 2001-06 CLTP scheme is currently not known. The main reason for closing the Par – St Dennis line was to remove the low road bridge on the A30 at Goss Moor, however alternative road improvements have since been completed. A new dual carriageway stretch of A30 has been built to the north of the old A30 and bridge. The old stretch of A30 under the low bridge is now a minor road and cycle path.
