= Mid Cornwall Metro =

Railway development project in Cornwall, UK

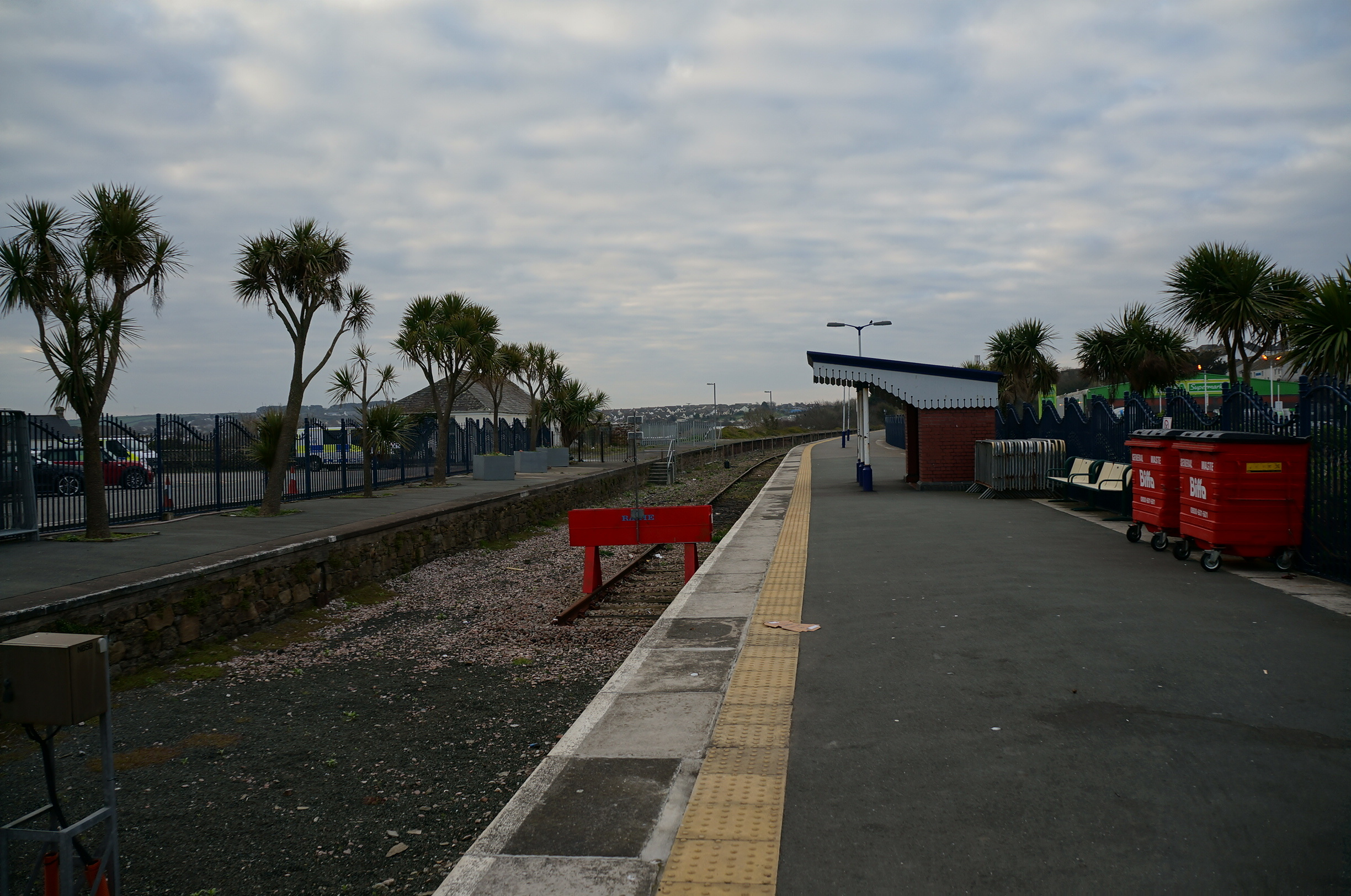
Newquay prior to the works, with a disused platform to the left

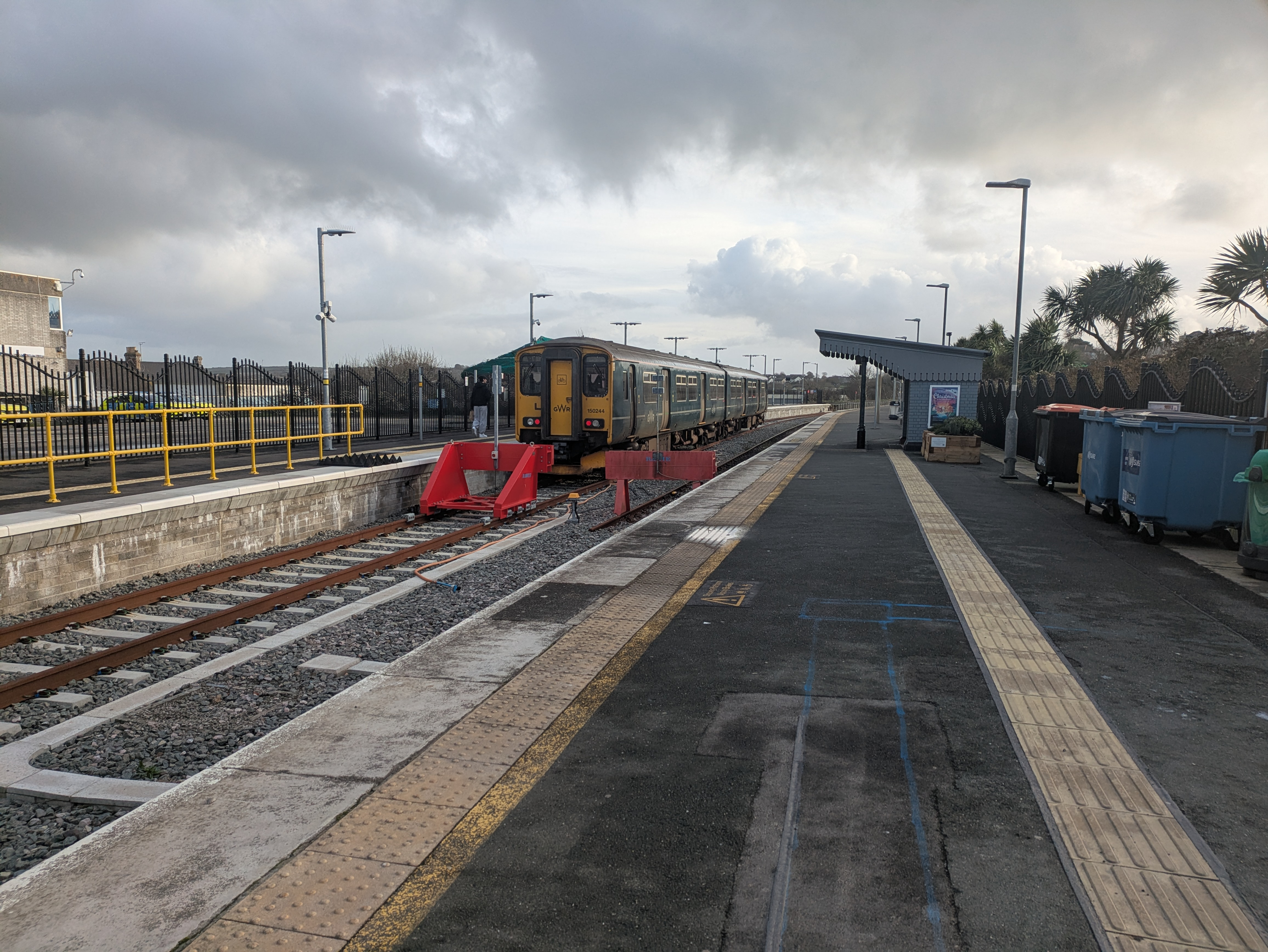
In 2025 following the restoration of the disused platform

The Mid Cornwall Metro (MCM) (Cornish: Metro Kernow Kres) is a £56.8 million rail redevelopment project in Cornwall, United Kingdom. The project is designed to enhance coast-to-coast connectivity between the stations of Falmouth Docks and Newquay. Of the £56.8M, £50M is from the UK's Levelling Up Fund. It is a joint venture between Network Rail, Cornwall Council and Great Western Railway.

Many of the improvements are on the Atlantic Coast Line, such as restoring Newquay station's second platform, adding a passing loop at Tregoss Moor, and updating signalling. More than ten new digital signals have been installed, mostly at the Newquay end of the line or at Tregoss Moor. Other improvements also involve the Maritime Line, including extending one train per hour to terminate in to Par railway station. These changes allow for the Atlantic Coast Line to be doubled to an hourly service, as well as allowing for journeys between Falmouth and Newquay without a transfer at Truro railway station.

Chancellor Rachel Reeves' scrapping of the Restoring Your Railways fund led to fears that some or all of the MCM would be cancelled, but as the project is funded from elsewhere it was not affected. St Austell & Newquay MP Noah Law confirmed that there would be no impact on the development.

The scheme is planned to take two years, between 2024 and 2026. The 400 m (440 yards) passing loop at Tregoss Moor was completed in March 2025. The second platform at Newquay had also been completed, and was in use as of November 2025.

In May 2026 the first phase was launched, between Newquay and Par. Great Western Railway cited an increase of almost 25% in journeys between 17 and 23 May as compared to the same period in 2025.

== Route ==
When the route is complete, trains will depart hourly from Newquay and pass through Par, St Austell station and Truro before arriving at Falmouth Docks, the terminus of the Maritime line. The full route to be opened in 2026 is:

- Newquay
- Quintrell Downs
- St Columb Road
- Roche
- Bugle
- Luxulyan
- Par
- St Austell
- Truro
- Perranwell
- Penryn
- Penmere
- Falmouth Town
- Falmouth Docks

== See also ==
- Disused railway stations on the Cornish Main Line
- Truro and Newquay Railway
- Devon Metro
