= Roche railway station =

Railway station in Cornwall, England

Roche Tregarrek
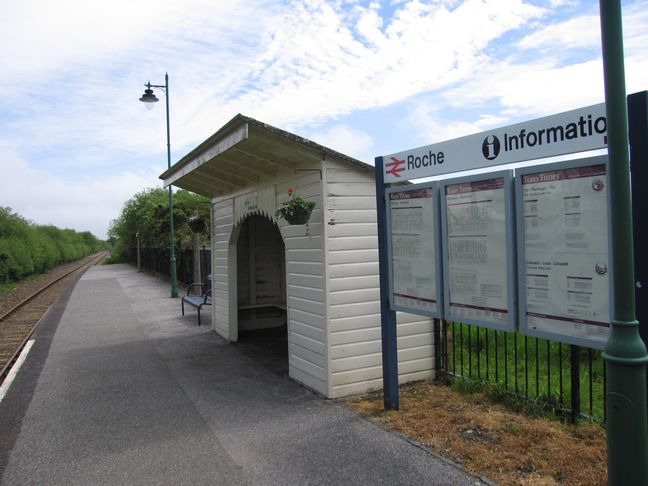

General information
- Location: Roche, Cornwall; England
- Coordinates: 50.419°N 4.831°W
- Grid reference: SW989614
- Manager: Great Western Railway
- Platforms: 1

Other information
- Station code: ROC
- Classification: DfT category F2

History
- Original company: Cornwall Minerals Ry
- Pre-grouping: Great Western Railway
- Post-grouping: Great Western Railway

Key dates
- 1876: 'Victoria' opened
- 1904: Renamed 'Roche'

Passengers
- 2021/22: ▲5,012
- 2022/23: ▼4,908
- 2023/24: ▲5,418
- 2024/25: ▼5,230
- 2025/26: ▲6,366
Location
Notes
- Passenger statistics from the Office of Rail and Road

Roche railway station (Cornish: Tregarrek) serves the village of Roche in Cornwall, England. The station is situated on the Atlantic Coast Line, 290 miles 40 chains (290.50 miles, 467.51 km) measured from the zero point at London Paddington (via Box and Plymouth Millbay). The station is managed and served by Great Western Railway local trains.

== History ==
The Cornwall Minerals Railway opened its line from Fowey to Newquay on 1 June 1874. The trains at first carried only goods traffic and a depot was provided at Holywell. A passenger service was introduced on 20 June 1876 when the depot was renamed "Victoria", which gave its name to the modern hamlet on the site, and then changed to "Roche" on 1 May 1904.

The passing loop was extended on 3 July 1936 to accommodate the longer holiday trains then using the line. It was closed on 3 January 1965 when the goods yard was closed. For a while trains used the old westbound platform but on 12 July 1965 this was changed to the eastbound platform and the westbound track was then removed.

== Services ==
Roche is a request stop on the line, so passengers wishing to alight must inform the conductor and passengers wishing to join the train must signal to the driver. The typical service is one train every two hours in each direction between Par and Newquay. Local trains are usually operated by Class 150 Sprinters.

Preceding station	National Rail	Following station
St Columb Road towards Newquay	Great Western Railway Atlantic Coast Line	Bugle towards Par

== Community rail ==
The trains between Par and Newquay are designated as a community rail service and is supported by marketing provided by the Devon and Cornwall Rail Partnership. The line is promoted under the "Atlantic Coast Line" name.

The Victoria Inn at Roche is part of the Atlantic Coast Line rail ale trail.
