= Quintrell Downs railway station =

Railway station in Cornwall, England

Quintrell Downs Goonkoyntrel
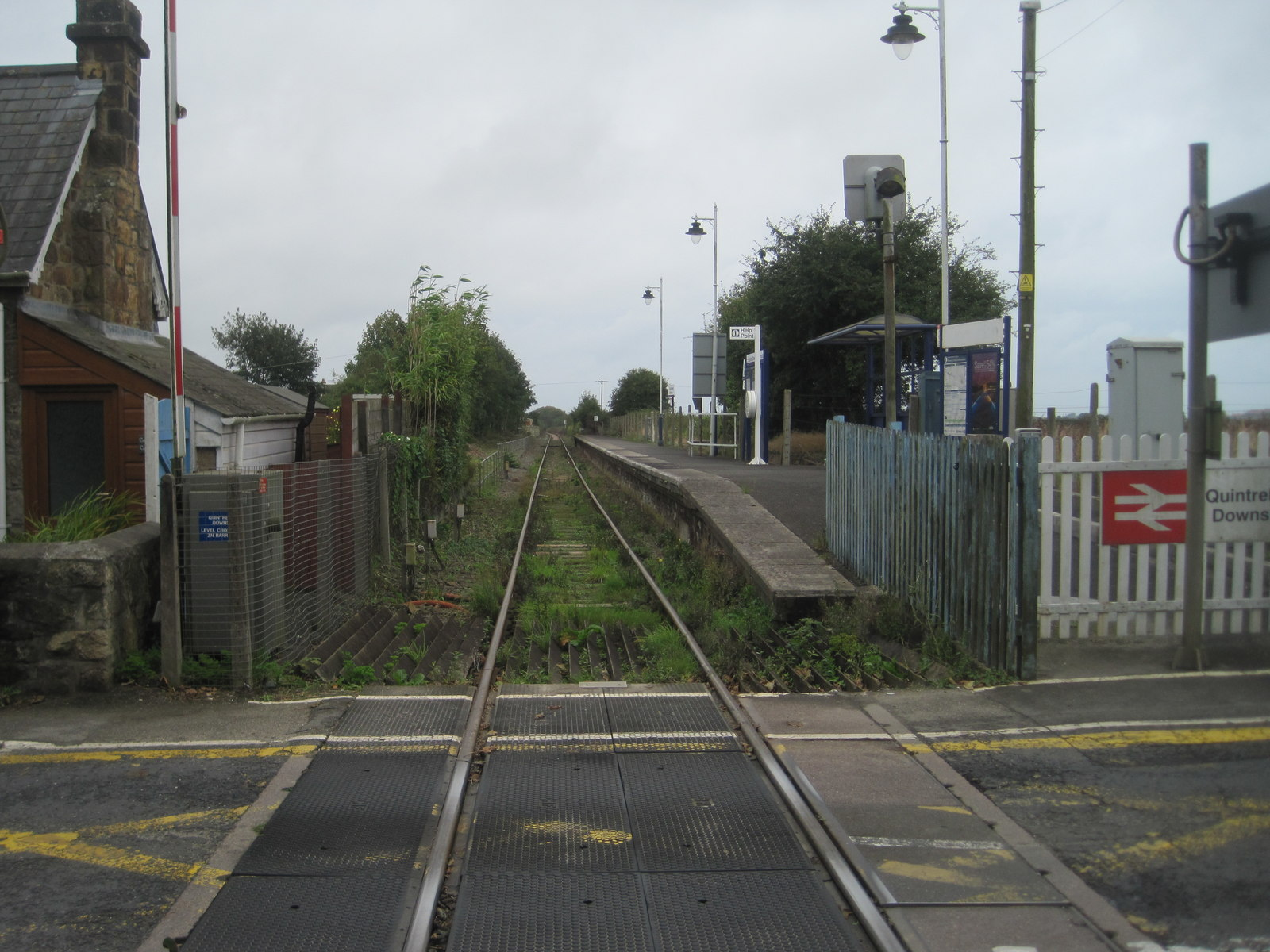
- Station seen from the level crossing

General information
- Location: Quintrell Downs, Cornwall; England
- Coordinates: 50.404°N 5.029°W
- Grid reference: SW848604
- Manager: Great Western Railway
- Platforms: 1

Other information
- Station code: QUI
- Classification: DfT category F2

History
- Original company: Great Western Railway

Key dates
- 1911: Opened

Passengers
- 2021/22: ▲2,804
- 2022/23: ▲3,038
- 2023/24: ▲3,374
- 2024/25: ▲3,514
- 2025/26: ▲5,124
Location
Notes
- Passenger statistics from the Office of Rail and Road

Quintrell Downs railway station (Cornish: Goonkoyntrel) serves the village of Quintrell Downs in Cornwall, England. It is 300 miles 16 chains (300.20 miles, 483.13 km) measured from the zero point at London Paddington (via Box and Plymouth Millbay), on the Atlantic Coast Line. The station is managed by Great Western Railway with local services in each direction all calling here.

== History ==
The first railway here was a horse-worked line from Newquay Harbour to Hendra Crazey. It was built by Joseph Treffry and completed in 1849. The Cornwall Minerals Railway opened its line from Fowey to St Dennis Junction on 1 June 1874, where it connected with Treffry's Newquay Railway. Although a siding was provided at an early date and passenger trains began passing through from 20 June 1876, the station at Quintrell Downs was not opened until 2 October 1911 (as Quintrell Downs Platform), by which time the line was part of the Great Western Railway. The suffix 'platform' in a GWR station name meant a staffed halt, and a member of staff remained until the gated level crossing was replaced by an open crossing in the 1990s. This crossing was upgraded to automatic half barriers in 2003-04.

== Services ==
Class 150 with a service to Par

Quintrell Downs is the only intermediate station on the line to not be a request stop. The typical service is one train every hour in each direction between Par and Newquay. Local trains are usually operated by Class 150 Sprinters and Class 175 Coradias.

Preceding station	National Rail	Following station
Newquay Terminus	Great Western Railway Atlantic Coast Line	St Columb Road towards Par

== Community rail ==
Local trains on the Newquay branch are designated as community rail services and are supported with marketing jointly provided by the Devon and Cornwall Rail Partnership and the franchised operator. The route is promoted as the "Atlantic Coast Line".
