= St Columb Road railway station =

Railway station in Cornwall, England

St Columb Road Fordh Sen Kolom
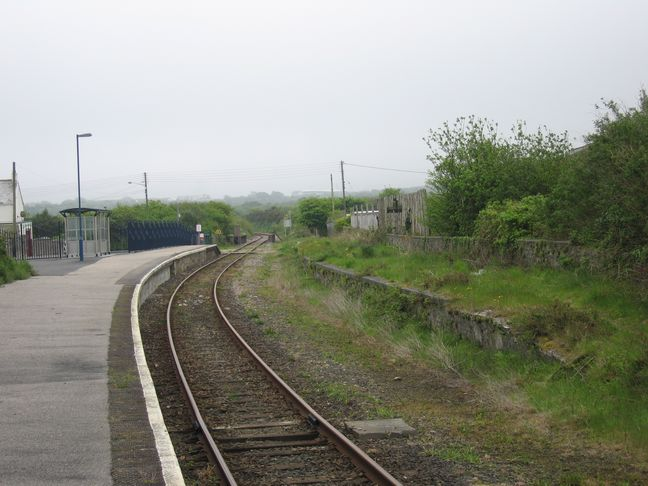

General information
- Location: St Columb Road, Cornwall; England
- Coordinates: 50.3982°N 4.9407°W
- Grid reference: SW910595
- Manager: Great Western Railway
- Platforms: 1

Other information
- Station code: SCR
- Classification: DfT category F2

History
- Original company: Cornwall Minerals Ry
- Pre-grouping: Great Western Railway
- Post-grouping: Great Western Railway

Key dates
- 20 June 1876: 'Halloon' opened
- 1 November 1878: Renamed 'St Columb Road'

Passengers
- 2021/22: ▲2,662
- 2022/23: ▲2,794
- 2023/24: ▲3,396
- 2024/25: ▲3,542
- 2025/26: ▲4,834
Location
Notes
- Passenger statistics from the Office of Rail and Road

St Columb Road railway station (Cornish: Fordh Sen Kolom) serves the village of St Columb Road in Cornwall, England. The station is situated on the Atlantic Coast Line, 296 miles 11 chains (296.14 miles, 476.59 km) measured from the zero point at London Paddington (via Box and Plymouth Millbay). All services are operated by Great Western Railway, which also manages the station.

== History ==
The first railway here was a horse-worked line from Newquay Harbour to Hendra Crazey. It was built by Joseph Treffry and completed in 1849.

The Cornwall Minerals Railway opened its line from Fowey to St Dennis Junction on 1 June 1874, where it connected with Treffry's Newquay Railway. The trains continued to carry only goods traffic but a passenger service was introduced on 20 June 1876. The station was originally known as Halloon but was renamed "St Columb Road" on 1 November 1878.

The passing loop was extended in 1933 to accommodate the long holiday trains that were then handled on the branch, but it was taken out of use on 3 January 1965 when the goods yard was closed.

== Services ==
St Columb Road is a request stop on the line, so passengers wishing to alight must inform the conductor and passengers wishing to join the train must signal to the driver. The typical service is one train every two hours in each direction between Par and Newquay. Trains are usually operated by Class 150 Sprinters.

Preceding station	National Rail	Following station
Quintrell Downs towards Newquay	Great Western Railway Atlantic Coast Line	Roche towards Par

== Community rail ==
The trains between Par and Newquay are designated as a community rail service and is supported by marketing provided by the Devon and Cornwall Rail Partnership. The line is promoted under the "Atlantic Coast Line" name.

== Bibliography ==
- Bennett, Alan (1988). The Great Western Railway in Mid Cornwall. Southampton: Kingfisher Railway Publications. ISBN 0-946184-53-4.
- Cooke, RA (1977). Track Layout Diagrams of the GWR and BR WR, Section 11: East Cornwall. Harwell: RA Cooke.
- Vaughan, John (1991). The Newquay Branch and its Branches. Sparkford: Haynes/Oxford Publishing Company. ISBN 0-86093-470-5.
