= Bugle railway station =

Railway station in Cornwall, England

Bugle Karnrosveur
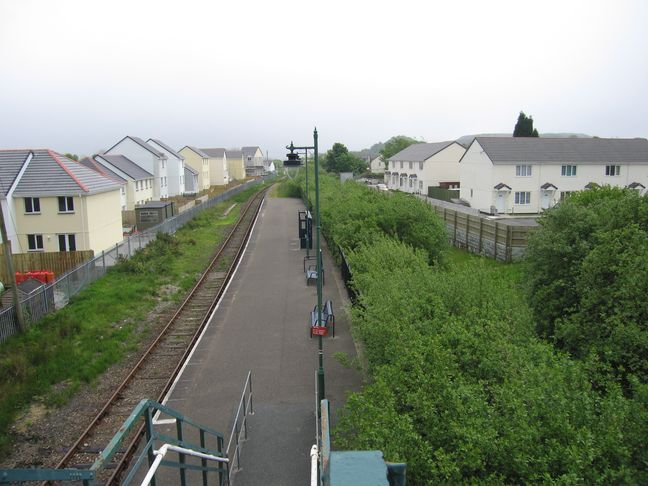

General information
- Location: Bugle, Cornwall; England
- Coordinates: 50.400°N 4.792°W
- Grid reference: SX017592
- Manager: Great Western Railway
- Platforms: 1

Other information
- Station code: BGL
- Classification: DfT category F1

History
- Original company: Cornwall Minerals Ry
- Pre-grouping: Great Western Railway
- Post-grouping: Great Western Railway

Key dates
- 1876: Opened

Passengers
- 2021–2022: ▲6,390
- 2022–2023: ▲6,620
- 2023–2024: ▼6,342
- 2024–2025: ▲6,528
- 2025–2026: ▲7,880
Location

Bugle railway station (Cornish: Karnrosveur) serves the village of Bugle in Cornwall, England. The station is situated at milepost 288 on the Atlantic Coast Line. All trains are operated by and the station is managed by Great Western Railway.

== History ==
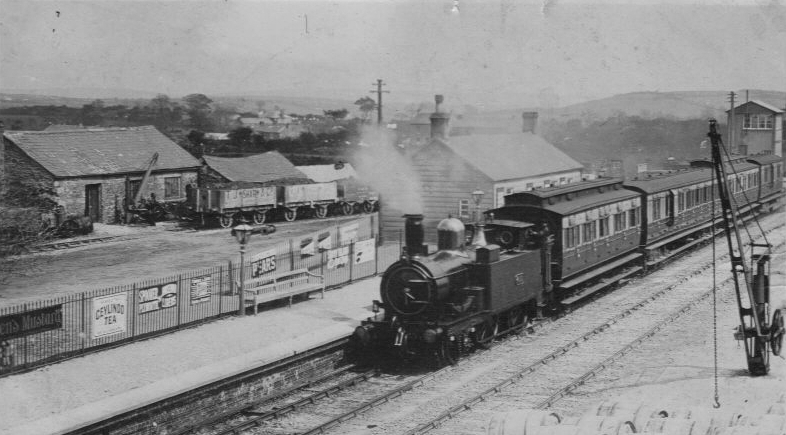
Bugle station circa 1910.

The first railway here was a horse-worked line from Par Harbour to "near the Bugle Inn" at Molinnis. On 1 June 1874 a new line was opened by the Cornwall Minerals Railway. A passenger service was introduced on 20 June 1876 when a station with a single platform on the north side of the line was provided at Bugle. The station was named after the local Bugle Inn, which opened in 1840.

The line from Bugle eastwards to Goonbarrow Junction was doubled on 20 July 1930, with the new line passing behind the platform to create an island platform. From 29 November 1964 the original line was only used only for freight trains to reach the Carbis branch. This meant that all passenger trains now use the 1930 platform face. The Carbis branch closed on 25 August 1989 leaving just a single track through the station and all the way to Newquay, which sets the low frequency of train service which is possible on the branch.

== Description ==
Bugle is 288 miles 3 chains (463.6 km) from London Paddington station (this is measured via Box and Plymouth Millbay). It has a single platform.

The station has a waiting shelter, benches and cycle spaces. there are no facilities to purchase tickets.

== Passengers ==
Historic data from the first half of the twentieth century shows that more than 11,000 tickets could be sold each year.

Tickets sold
Year	Tickets
1903	6,293
1913	8,679
1923	11,725
1933	11,273

Modern data counts both passengers starting or finishing journeys at Bugle. These often used to total fewer than 1,000 each year but were more than 2,500 by 2008 and peaked at 6,810 in 2013–2014 before settling at between 4,300 and 5,600. During the COVID-19 pandemic in the United Kingdom they dropped to just 2,412, which was more than 'normal' years before 2008, but have exceeded 6,000 every year since and reach 7,880 in 2025–2026.

Passengers by year
Year (Note: The passenger data covers twelve month periods that start in April.)	Entries and exits
1997–1998	983
1998–1999	1,385
1999–2000	1,262
2000–2001	1,042
2001–2002	943
2002–2003	836
2003–2004	No data
2004–2005	1,362
2005–2006	1,661
2006–2007	1,691
2007–2008	1,557
2008–2009	2,508
2009–2010	3,694
2010–2011	3,650
2011–2012	5,902
2012–2013	6,762
2013–2014	6,810
2014–2015	5,554
2015–2016	4,342
2016–2017	4,462
2017–2018	4,766
2018–2019	5,616
2019–2020	4,794
2020–2021	2,412 (Note: Travel in 2020 was much reduced due to the COVID-19 pandemic in the United Kingdom)
2021–2022	6,390
2022–2023	6,620
2023–2024	6,342
2024–2025	6,528
2025–2026	7,880

== Services ==
Bugle is a request stop on the line, so passengers wishing to alight must inform the conductor and passengers wishing to join the train must signal to the driver. The typical service is one train every two hours in each direction between Par and Newquay.

Preceding station	National Rail	Following station
Roche towards Newquay	Great Western Railway Atlantic Coast Line	Luxulyan towards Par

== Community rail ==
The trains between Par and Newquay are designated as a community rail service and is supported by marketing provided by the Devon and Cornwall Rail Partnership. The line is promoted as the 'Atlantic Coast Line'.

== Bibliography ==
- Bennett, Alan (1988). The Great Western Railway in Mid Cornwall. Southampton: Kingfisher Railway Publications. ISBN 0-946184-53-4.
- Cooke, RA (1977). Track Layout Diagrams of the GWR and BR WR, Section 11: East Cornwall. Harwell: RA Cooke.
- Quick, Michael (2023). Railway Passenger Stations in Great Britain: A Chronology (PDF) (5th ed.). London: Railway and Canal Historical Society.
- Vaughan, John (1991). The Newquay Branch and its Branches. Sparkford: Haynes/Oxford Publishing Company. ISBN 0-86093-470-5.
- Wills, Dixe (2014). Tiny Stations (Paperback, 1st reprint ed.). Basingstoke: AA Publishing. ISBN 978-0-7495-7732-2.
