= Box (Mill Lane) Halt railway station =

Disused railway station in England

Box (Mill Lane) Halt Railway Station
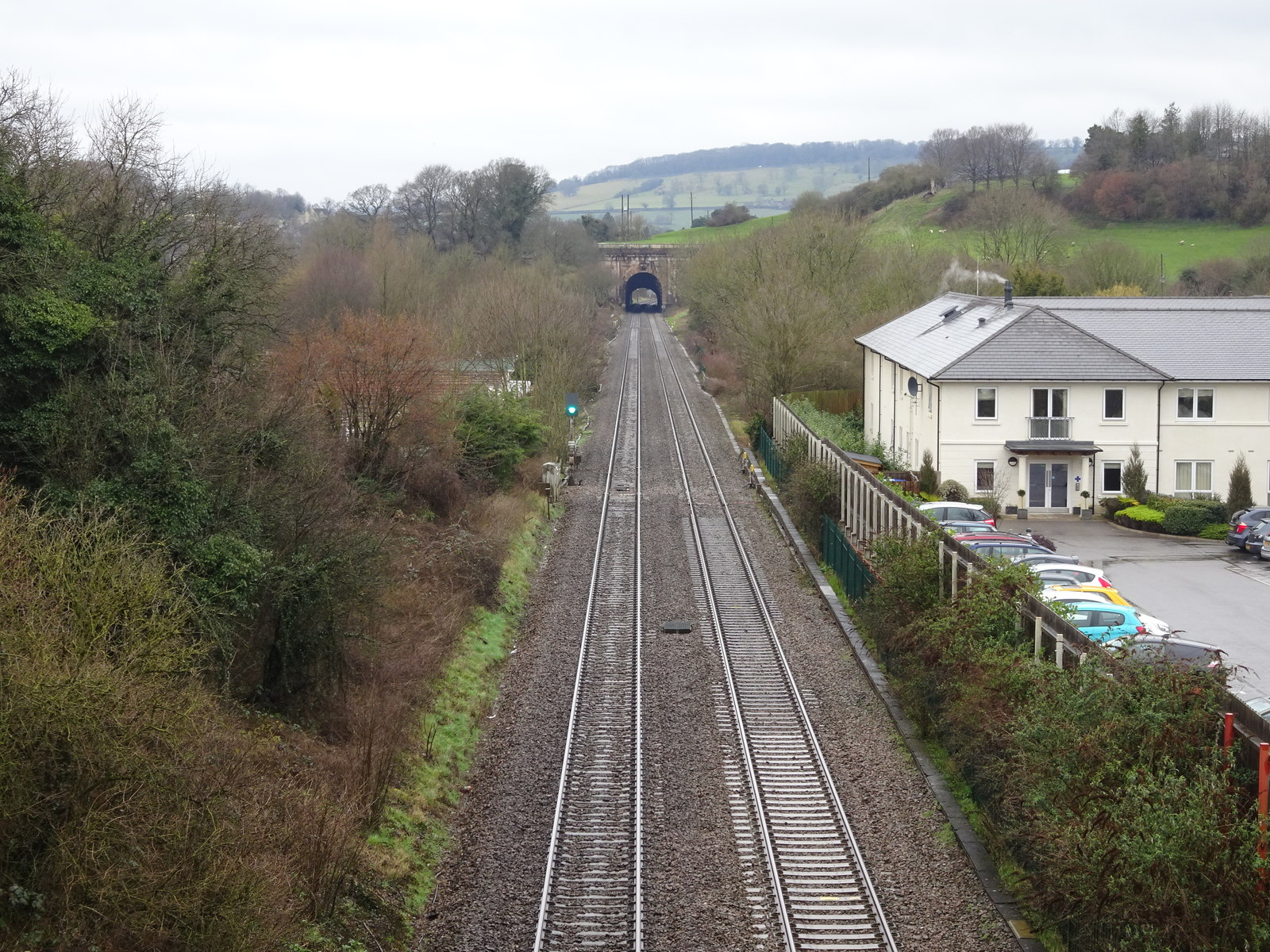
- The site in 2018

General information
- Location: Box, County of Wiltshire; England
- Coordinates: 51.4182°N 2.253809°W
- Platforms: 2

Other information
- Status: Disused

History
- Original company: Great Western Railway

Key dates
- 31 March 1930: Opened
- 4 January 1965: Closed
Location

Box (Mill Lane) Halt railway station served the village of Box in Wiltshire, England. The station was on the main Great Western Railway line from London to Bristol and opened in 1930. and closed in 1965.

Preceding station	Historical railways	Following station
Box; Line open, station closed	Great Western Railway; Great Western Main Line	Corsham; Line open, station closed
