= Luxulyan railway station =

Railway station in Cornwall, England

Luxulyan Logsulyan
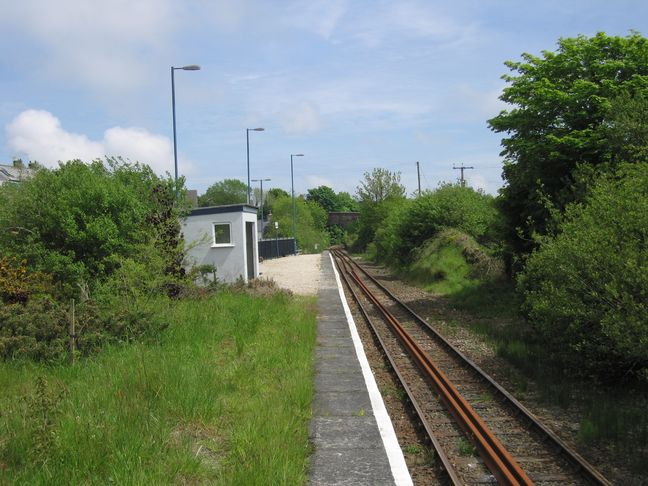

General information
- Location: Luxulyan, Cornwall; England
- Coordinates: 50.390°N 4.748°W
- Grid reference: SX047581
- Manager: Great Western Railway
- Platforms: 1

Other information
- Station code: LUX
- Classification: DfT category F2

History
- Original company: Cornwall Minerals Ry
- Pre-grouping: Great Western Railway
- Post-grouping: Great Western Railway

Key dates
- 1876: Opened

Passengers
- 2021–2022: ▲1,696
- 2022–2023: ▲2,522
- 2023–2024: ▲2,660
- 2024–2025: ▲3,196
- 2025–2026: ▲3,898
Location

Luxulyan railway station (Cornish: Logsulyan) serves the civil parish and village of Luxulyan in mid-Cornwall, England. The station is situated on the Atlantic Coast Line at milepost 286 from London Paddington. Trains are operated by Great Western Railway.

== History ==
The first railway at Luxulyan was a horse-worked tramway from Par Harbour to Molinnis which was built by Joseph Treffry, opening between 1844 and 1847. It climbed up the side of the Luxulyan Valley on a cable-worked incline and then crossed it on the Treffry Viaduct.

The tramways was rebuilt as a conventional steam-powered railway by the Cornwall Minerals Railway, reopening on 1 June 1874. The new railway linked Fowey and Newquay but bypassed the incline with a more gentle ascent from Par, passing beneath the Treffry Viaduct and entering Luxulyan through the 50 yards (46 m) Luxulyan Tunnel. A passenger service was introduced on 20 June 1876. The station at Luxulyan was originally known as 'Bridges' but sometimes appeared in timetables as 'Bridges for Luxulyan'. It was renamed 'Luxulyan' on 1 May 1905.

The station, as built, had two platforms, one either side of a passing loop. There were goods sidings and a signal box. It was rebuilt in 1910, a single island platform now had a track on either side, and a new signal box was opened on 30 March 1911. The goods yard was on the east side and, from 1916, there was an extra siding at the north end for china clay traffic from Treskilling china clay works.

The staff were withdrawn from the station 12 July 1964, the goods yard and signal box closed on 27 September 1964. This left just a single track along the west side of the platform.

== Description ==
The station is 285 miles 78 chains (285.98 miles, 460.23 km) from London Paddington (measured via via Box Tunnel and Plymouth Millbay).

There is a single platform on the east side of the track which has a shelter and seats. At the southern end of this is the car park which connects to a small lane that leads to the village's main road. The station has a solar powered help point which allows waiting people to find out when the next trains will arrive.

== Passengers ==
Historic data from the first half of the twentieth century shows that more than 4,000 tickets were being sold each year, reaching a peak of more than 7,000 in the 1920s.

Tickets sold
| Year | Tickets |
|---|---|
| 1903 | 4,845 |
| 1913 | 5,772 |
| 1923 | 7,465 |
| 1933 | 4,187 |

Modern data counts both passengers starting or finishing journeys at Luxulyan. These used to total less than 1,000 each year but have been increasing. There have generally been more than 1,000 since 2002 and exceed 2,000 in some years. During the COVID-19 pandemic in the United Kingdom they dropped to just 744 but had returned to pre-COVID levels by 2022. In 2024–2025 they exceeded 3,000 for the first time.

Passengers by year
| Year (Note: The passenger data covers twelve month periods that start in April.) | Entries and exits |
|---|---|
| 1997–1998 | 338 |
| 1998–1999 | 439 |
| 1999–2000 | 837 |
| 2000–2001 | 682 |
| 2001–2002 | 745 |
| 2002–2003 | 1,005 |
| 2003–2004 | No data |
| 2004–2005 | 791 |
| 2005–2006 | 1,160 |
| 2006–2007 | 1,252 |
| 2007–2008 | 922 |
| 2008–2009 | 1,210 |
| 2009–2010 | 1,372 |
| 2010–2011 | 1,420 |
| 2011–2012 | 1,836 |
| 2012–2013 | 1,428 |
| 2013–2014 | 1,654 |
| 2014–2015 | 2,170 |
| 2015–2016 | 1,874 |
| 2016–2017 | 2,404 |
| 2017–2018 | 2,394 |
| 2018–2019 | 1,770 |
| 2019–2020 | 1,470 |
| 2020–2021 | 744 (Note: Travel in 2020 was much reduced due to the COVID-19 pandemic in the United Kingdom) |
| 2021–2022 | 1,696 |
| 2022–2023 | 2,522 |
| 2023–2024 | 2,660 |
| 2024–2025 | 3,196 |
| 2025–2026 | 3,898 |

== Services ==
Luxulyan is a request stop on the line, so passengers wishing to alight must inform the conductor and passengers wishing to join the train must signal to the driver. The typical service is one train every two hours in each direction between Par and Newquay.

| Preceding station | National Rail | Following station |
|---|---|---|
| Bugle towards Newquay | Great Western Railway Atlantic Coast Line | Par Terminus |

== Community rail ==
The trains between Par and Newquay are designated as a community rail service and is supported by marketing provided by the Devon and Cornwall Rail Partnership. The line is promoted as the 'Atlantic Coast Line'.

== Further reeading ==
- Wills, Dixe (2014). Tiny Stations. AA Publishing. p. 43. ISBN 978-0-7495-7732-2.
