= Rail ale trail =

A rail ale trail is a marketing exercise in the United Kingdom that is designed to promote tourism to a rural area, by encouraging people to visit a series of pubs that are close to stations along a railway line. Participants are rewarded for visiting the pubs by train. In doing this they increase the number of passengers on the railway and bring money into the local economy. The scheme is often supported by the Campaign for Real Ale. The beer is usually brewed locally and many of the pubs offer food as well.

Each trail is publicised by a free booklet that is distributed through stations and local outlets, and which is also available for downloading from the internet. Each time a pub is visited the booklet is stamped, provided a valid rail ticket is shown when a purchase is made. Once sufficient stamps have been collected, the booklet can be exchanged for merchandise specific to each trail, such as a T-shirt, cap or badge.

== History ==
On 1 October 1977 the first rail ale trail was run by Gerald Daniels, of Crookham Travel under the name "Rail Ale Ramble". A chartered train with 598 passengers ran from London to Bath, Somerset and Oxford. More than thirty years later Crookham Travel still run Rail Ale Rambles. Meanwhile, the term "rail ale" has been adopted by organisations such as the Devon and Cornwall Rail Partnership, who promote rural train routes in the English West Country. In the 1980s the local railway management had promoted travel to pubs close to stations using the tag line "Let us drive you to the pub". Some incentives were offered to railway passengers to use certain pubs.

== In Devon and Cornwall ==
=== Tarka Line ===
The Tarka Line Rail Ale Trail was the first to be launched in Devon and Cornwall and started in 2002. The "Beer Engine" at Newton St Cyres railway station had pioneered the use of rail travel to bring drinkers to its bar. It opened in 1985 in the old railway hotel opposite the station and was soon offering a discount on production of a rail ticket. However, since 2018 The Beer Engine is sadly no longer on the trail.

The trail originally covered 16 pubs, and increased to a peak of 19, but one has since closed. There are five pubs in Exeter and four in Barnstaple, with one each at Newton St Cyres railway station, Crediton railway station, Yeoford railway station, Copplestone, Morchard Road railway station, Lapford, Eggesford railway station, Portsmouth Arms railway station, and Umberleigh. The collecting of 5, 10 or 18 stamps entitles the participant to claim Tarka Line Rail Trail merchandise.

=== Maritime Line ===
The Maritime Line Rail Ale Trail was the second to be launched, in 2003, covering 14 pubs. There are four pubs in Truro, one in Perranwell, three in Penryn, and six in Falmouth – two of which are close to Penmere railway station, and four in the town centre.

=== Looe Valley Line ===
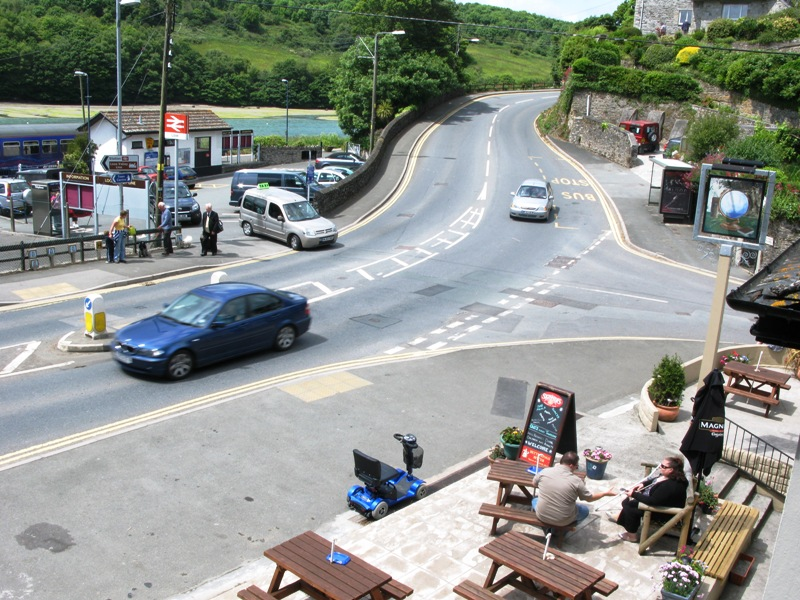
The Globe Inn near Looe railway station on the Looe Valley Line ale trail

The Looe Valley Line Rail Ale Trail was the third pilot scheme, launched early in 2004, and covering 11 pubs between Liskeard and Looe. Seven of the pubs are in Looe and two in Liskeard. The remaining pubs are "Ye Old Plough House Inn" at Duloe, a 30-minute walk from Causeland railway station, and the "Polruan Country House Hotel" near Sandplace railway station.

=== Tamar Valley Line ===
The Tamar Valley Line Rail Ale Trail launched late in 2004 and contains 17 pubs. Six are in Plymouth city centre and a further three in the suburbs near Devonport and St Budeaux Victoria Road railway stations. There are single pubs to visit at Bere Ferrers and Bere Alston, one in Calstock and five in Gunnislake.

=== St Ives Bay Line ===
The St Ives Bay Line Rail Ale Trail was launched on 3 June 2005 with 14 pubs. Five are in St Ives, one in Lelant, two close to Lelant Saltings railway station and one near St Erth railway station. The five remaining pubs are in Penzance which is usually reached by changing trains at St Erth onto the Cornish Main Line, although there are also a very few through trains from St Ives railway station.

=== Atlantic Coast Line ===
The Atlantic Coast Line runs from Par to Newquay. It was launched in 2005 with 16 pubs but one has since closed. There are three in Newquay, two near St Columb Road railway station, six in and around Par, and one each at Quintrell Downs, Roche, Bugle and Luxulyan.

=== Salisbury - Exeter ===
In May 2024, a new trail along the western section of the West of England line was added to the current six. Branded as Salisbury - Exeter, the line features nineteen pubs and stretches across four counties.

== Elsewhere ==
=== Abbey Line ===
A collection of 16 pubs in St Albans, Bricket Wood, Park Street and Watford, Hertfordshire. Participants are encouraged to collect a stamp from each of the pubs, with the reward for doing so a specially designed Rail Ale T-shirt showing the Abbey Line Rail Ale Trail logo.

=== North TransPennine ===
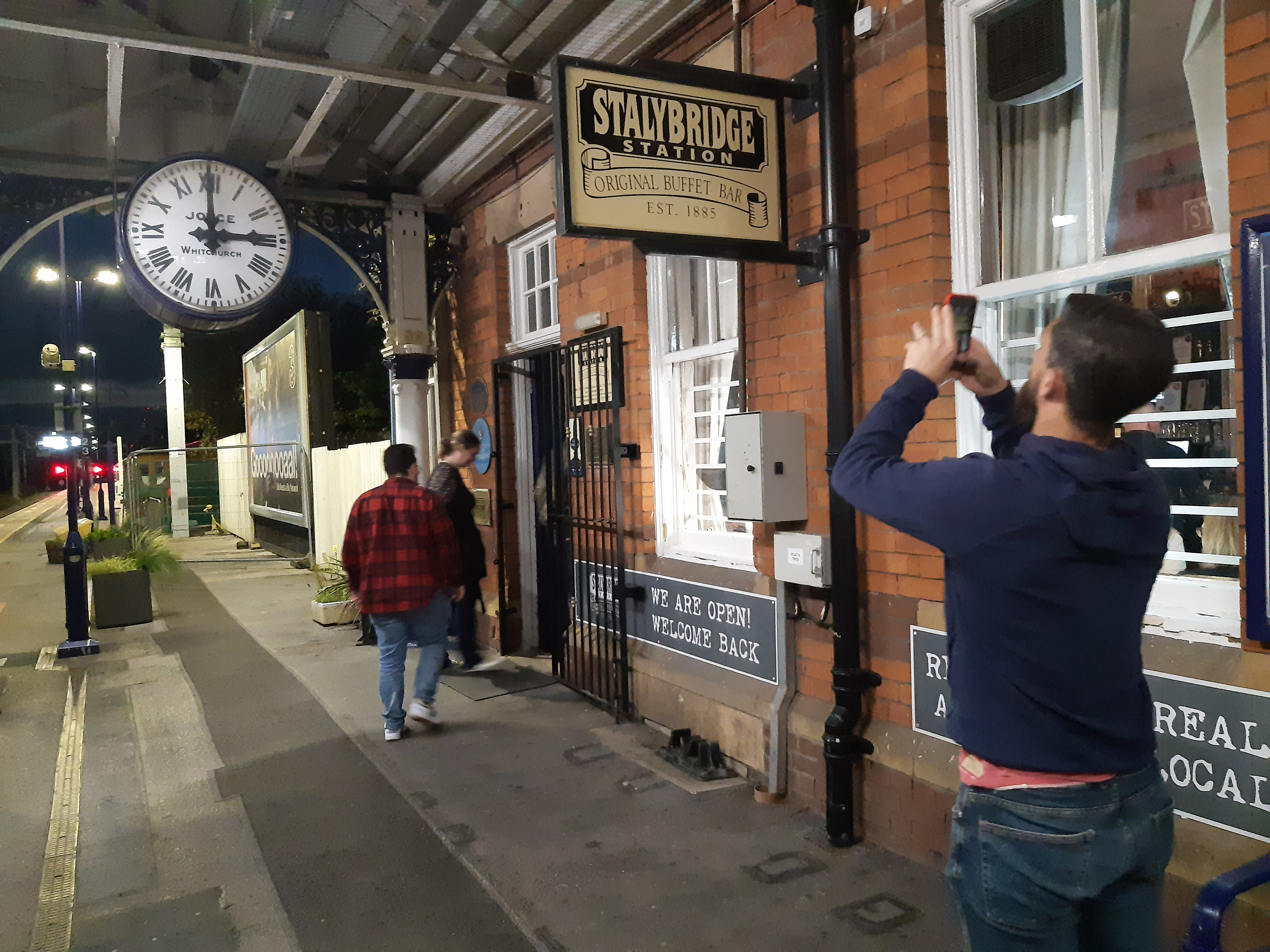
Participants on the North TransPennine Ale Trail arriving into Stalybridge Buffet Bar (located in Stalybridge railway station) on their return journey to Manchester Picadilly

The North TransPennine Ale Trail from Stalybridge to Batley features 9 Real Ale pubs, all of which located within short walking distance from the stations. This trail was featured on the BBC2 programme, Oz and James Drink to Britain. In 2013 the trail hit the national headlines after the trail was hijacked by stag/hen dos and people in fancy dress, with a warning that the trail would be scrapped (which it later was in 2019) if the anti-social behaviour continued.

=== Regatta Line ===
Wokingham Council provide a "Real Ale by Rail in Henley" guide to several pubs along the Henley Branch Line (the "Regatta Line") from Twyford, Berkshire, to Henley-on-Thames, Oxfordshire.

=== Derwent Valley ===
A trail has been created for the Derwent Valley line between Derby and Matlock.

=== Wherry Lines ===
A scheme called "Ale Track" operates on the Wherry Lines from Norwich to Great Yarmouth and Lowestoft. Ten pubs are involved, which are accessible from the stations on the line. Participating pubs also offer a discount for train ticket holders.

=== East Lancashire Railway ===
The East Lancashire Railway promotes a rail ale trail of 19 pubs near its line.

== Former trails ==
Wessex Trains ran a Bristol to Weymouth Rail Ale Trail from 2005 but closed at the end of its rail franchise in 2006. Merchandise was offered for 10, 15 or 20 stamps of the 28 featured pubs which made this trail unusual in not expecting participants to visit every single pub; the award for 20 stamps included complimentary tickets for a return journey anywhere on Wessex Trains services but these were only valid until the end of that franchise on 31 March 2006 – First Great Western have not repeated the offer. Four of the pubs were in Bristol, three in Bath, Somerset, two in Frome, two in Dorchester, and four in Weymouth. The remaining 13 were situated one each in Keynsham, Freshford, at Avoncliff railway station, in Bradford-on-Avon, Trowbridge, Westbury, Bruton, Castle Cary, Yeovil, Thornford, Yetminster, Chetnole, Maiden Newton. These towns are mainly in Wiltshire and Dorset.
