= Corsham railway station =

Former railway station in England

Corsham
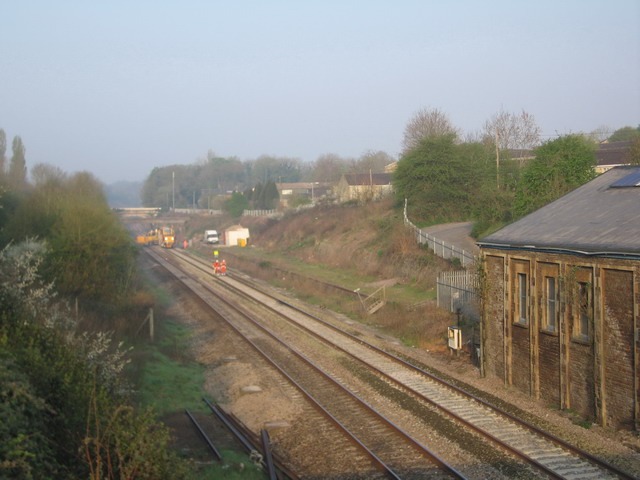
- Site of former station in 2007

General information
- Location: Corsham, County of Wiltshire; England
- Coordinates: 51.42535°N 2.18924°W
- Platforms: 2

Other information
- Status: Disused (reopening under study)

History
- Original company: Great Western Railway

Key dates
- June 1841: Opened
- 4 January 1965: Closed
Location

Corsham railway station served the town of Corsham in Wiltshire, England, between 1841 and 1965. Feasibility studies for the reopening of the station have been under way since 2021.

== History ==
The station was on the Great Western Railway main line from London to Bristol and was opened when the Chippenham to Bath section opened in June 1841.

The station was situated in a cutting to the south of the town, with the main station building at the top of the cutting on the town side. There were small shelters with canopies on each of the two platforms. Passengers accessed the up platform using a path, and the down platform from the footbridge. The Station Hotel was situated alongside the main station building.

Corsham had extensive and much-used sidings on both sides of the track to the west of the station, with a goods shed and a loading dock. The main goods traffic was stone from the quarries under Box Hill, which was brought to the lineside by a tramway system of 2 ft 5 1/2 in (750 mm) gauge. The sidings led right up to the mouth of Box Tunnel, whose eastern portal is less than 1 mile (1.6 km) from the station. A main line siding also extended to an underground wharf in Corsham Down Quarry near the tunnel.

Passenger services were withdrawn from Corsham with the end of stopping services between Swindon and Bath in January 1965. Goods traffic had ended in June 1963, though the siding with the loading dock remained in place until 1978. Of the station structures, only the goods shed remains; the footbridge is still in place as part of a footpath across the main line.

== Reopening ==
As the town has grown, reinstating the station has been suggested since at least 2009. In March 2021, a bid was made to the Department for Transport's "Restoring Your Railway" fund for a feasibility study into re-opening the station. In October 2021 it was announced that £50,000 would be provided for further studies. Local MP Michelle Donelan, who had been involved in the bid, said she hoped the new station could be built within five years. The study funded a business case which was submitted in November 2022. If successful, it is estimated that work could start in 2026 and the station would open in 2028.

| Preceding station | Historical railways | Following station |
|---|---|---|
| Chippenham; Line open, station open | Great Western Railway; Great Western Main Line | Box (Mill Lane) Halt; Line open, station closed |
