= Atlantic Coast Line (Cornwall) =

Railway line in Cornwall, UK

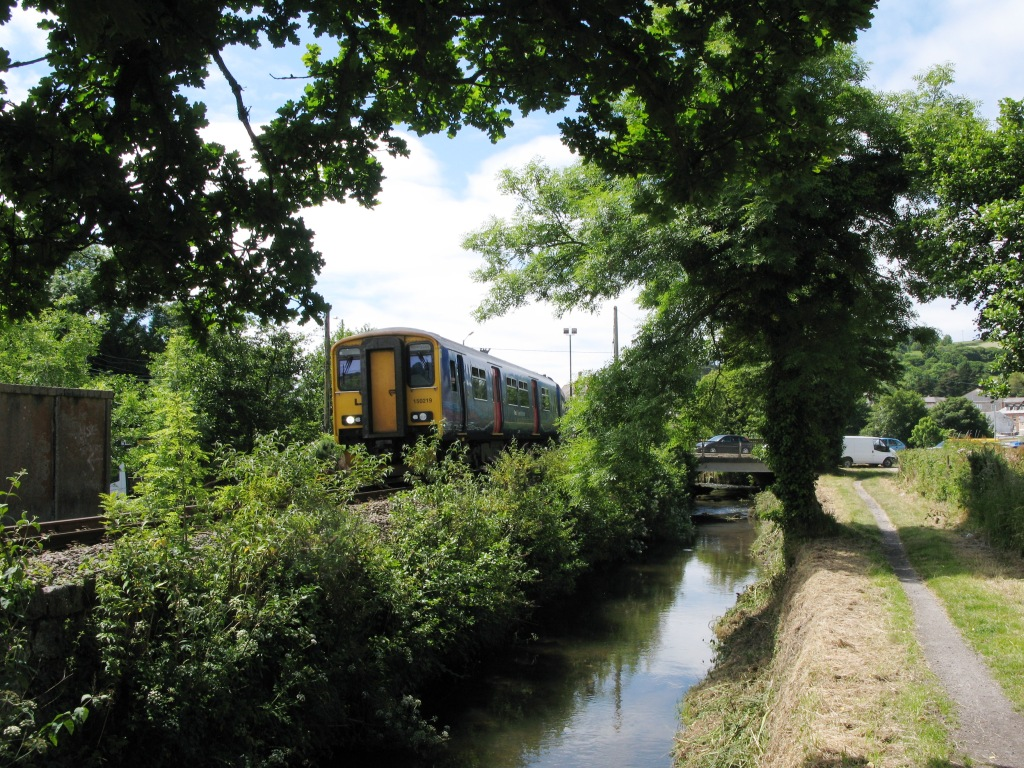
- Sprinter train on the branch line beside the Par Canal, having just passed St Blazey Bridge level crossing

Overview
- Native name: Linen Arvordiryow Atlantek
- Status: Open
- Owner: Network Rail
- Locale: Cornwall
- Coordinates: 50.355°N 4.705°W; 50.415°N 5.075°W
- Termini: Par; Newquay
- Stations: 7

Service
- Type: Branch line
- System: National Rail
- Operators: Great Western Railway; GB Railfreight
- Depot: Goonbarrow Junction (freight)
- Rolling stock: Class 66 (freight); Class 150; Class 175; Class 800; Class 802

History
- Opened: 1874

Technical
- Line length: 20 3/4 miles (33 km)
- Num of tracks: 1
- Track gauge: 4 ft 8 1/2 in (1,435 mm) standard gauge
- Loading gauge: RA6 / W6A
- Operating speed: 50 mph (80 km/h)
Route map
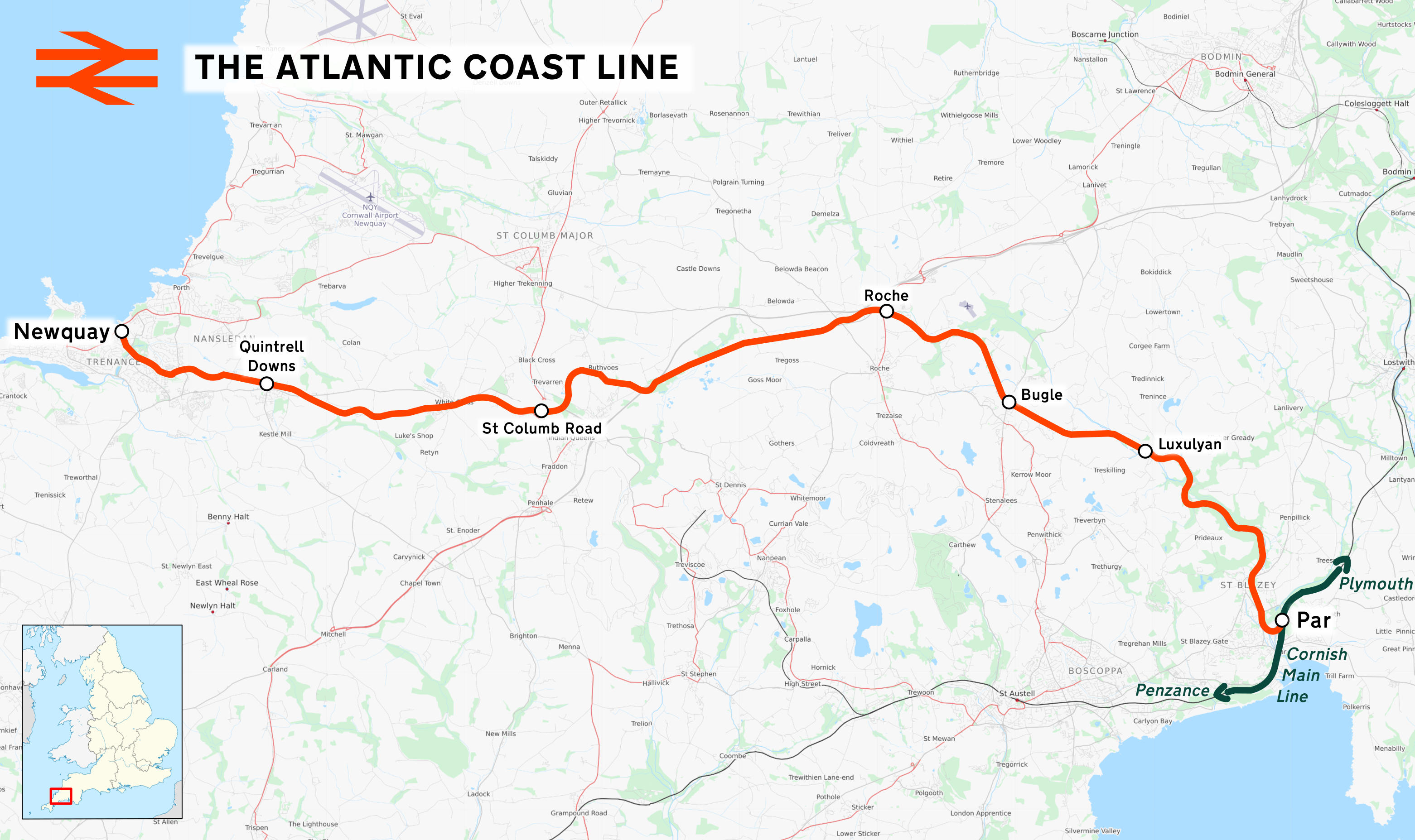

The Atlantic Coast Line (Cornish: Linen Arvordiryow Atlantek) is a 20 3/4-mile (33 km) railway branch line in Cornwall which runs from the coastal town of Par to the Atlantic Ocean at Newquay.

The line sees use for freight and passenger traffic, with both local passenger services, as well as seasonal long distance services from Newquay to London via Par.

As part of the Mid Cornwall Metro project, the line and many of its stations are currently undergoing works to improve service frequency. Another aim of the project is to provide a continuous service that runs from Newquay to Par along the line, then on to the Cornish Main Line on to Falmouth on the Maritime Line.

The line operates a community railway passenger service but the line is not itself a community railway due to its freight traffic.

== History ==
The Atlantic Coast line has its roots in the Treffry Tramways, a network of standard gauge horse-drawn tramways built by Joseph Treffry to move products of inland mines and quarries to his harbours at Par and Newquay. The first tramway, connecting a quarry and a canal to Par, opened in 1841 and reached Mollinis (today's Bugle railway station in 1843. It was extended to Par harbour in 1855, replacing the canal transfer at Ponts Mill. In 1844 work started on tramways feeding Newquay, including on from Hendra and St Dennis.

The tramways were rebuilt as the steam-powered Cornwall Minerals Railway (CMR) which opened on 1 June 1874. The new railway connected the two tramways and extended them to a third port, at Fowey. The railway's headquarters were established at St Blazey. Passenger services began between Newquay and Fowey on 20 June 1876. The Great Western Railway (GWR) took over the operation of the CMR's trains from 1 October 1877. (Note: Although the Great Western Railway operated the trains from 1877, the railway remained the property of the Cornwall Minerals Railway until 1896) There was no rail connection with the main line at Par station until January 1879 when a connecting line was laid from St Blazey railway station. Trains could not run through from the CMR line onto the mainline at Par as it was broad gauge line until May 1892.

=== Expansion under the GWR ===
The CMR was amalgamated into the Great Western Railway by the Cornwall Minerals Railway Act 1896. An old CMR branch line at Newquay became part of a new through route to Truro in July 1903. While the line through Par remained the best route for passengers travelling from London Paddington or Plymouth Millbay railway station, the new line was both quicker and cheaper for people travelling from Truro or west Cornwall. Newquay station was rebuilt to accommodate the extra trains, the old single track being increased to two platforms serving three tracks. Extra tracks were laid at Tolcarne Junction where the two routes joined just outside Newquay; these allowed trains to pass each other on either the Par or Truro routes.

Increasing traffic was accommodated by laying a second track on other sections of the line. This was done for 3 miles 62 chains (6.1 km; 3.78 mi) between St Dennis Junction and Tregoss in 1921, 63 chains (1.3 km; 0.79 mi) between Goonbarrow Junction and Bugle in 1930, and at St Columb Road station in 1931. The single-track viaduct Trenance at Newquay was rebuilt for two tracks in 1938 although it was 1946 before two tracks were laid throughout the short section between Tolcarne Junction and Newquay. On the other hand, St Blazey station closed in July 1925 and advertised passenger services withdrawn between there and Fowey.

=== Retraction under BR ===
The Great Western Railway was nationalised into British Railways on 1 January 1948. Things continued much as before until the early 1960s but then, over the space of about 25 years, the facilities were reduced to leave just a basic railway.

The alternative route between Newquay and Truro had already closed in February 1963. Public goods facilities were withdrawn at most stations during 1964, Newquay's being lost on 7 September. There were still goods trains that conveyed china clay from private sidings along the line and on connecting branches, but these too were slowly withdrawn until the only remaining sidings were those serving English China Clays works at Rocks, which is at Goonbarrow Junction.

Luxulyan and Bugle were reduced to just single platforms in 1964; The same happened at Roche and St Columb Road in 1965. Newquay retained its three platforms for the time being but some of the carriage sidings were removed. From 11 October 1987 there was just one platform in use and no run round loop so trains were limited to just diesel multiple units. All the double track sections and passing loops north of Goonbarrow had been removed by then, the loop at St Dennis Junction being the last to go in December 1986.

There was even a suggestion in 1987 that the line would be closed between Goonbarrow Junction and St Dennis Junction with passenger trains rerouted over a relaid line from Burngullow. This would have allowed the demolition of a restrictive bridge over the A30 road on Goss Moor. This failed to materialise and the road was moved instead; a new section which opened in 2007 diverted road traffic around the bridge.

=== 21st century resurgence ===
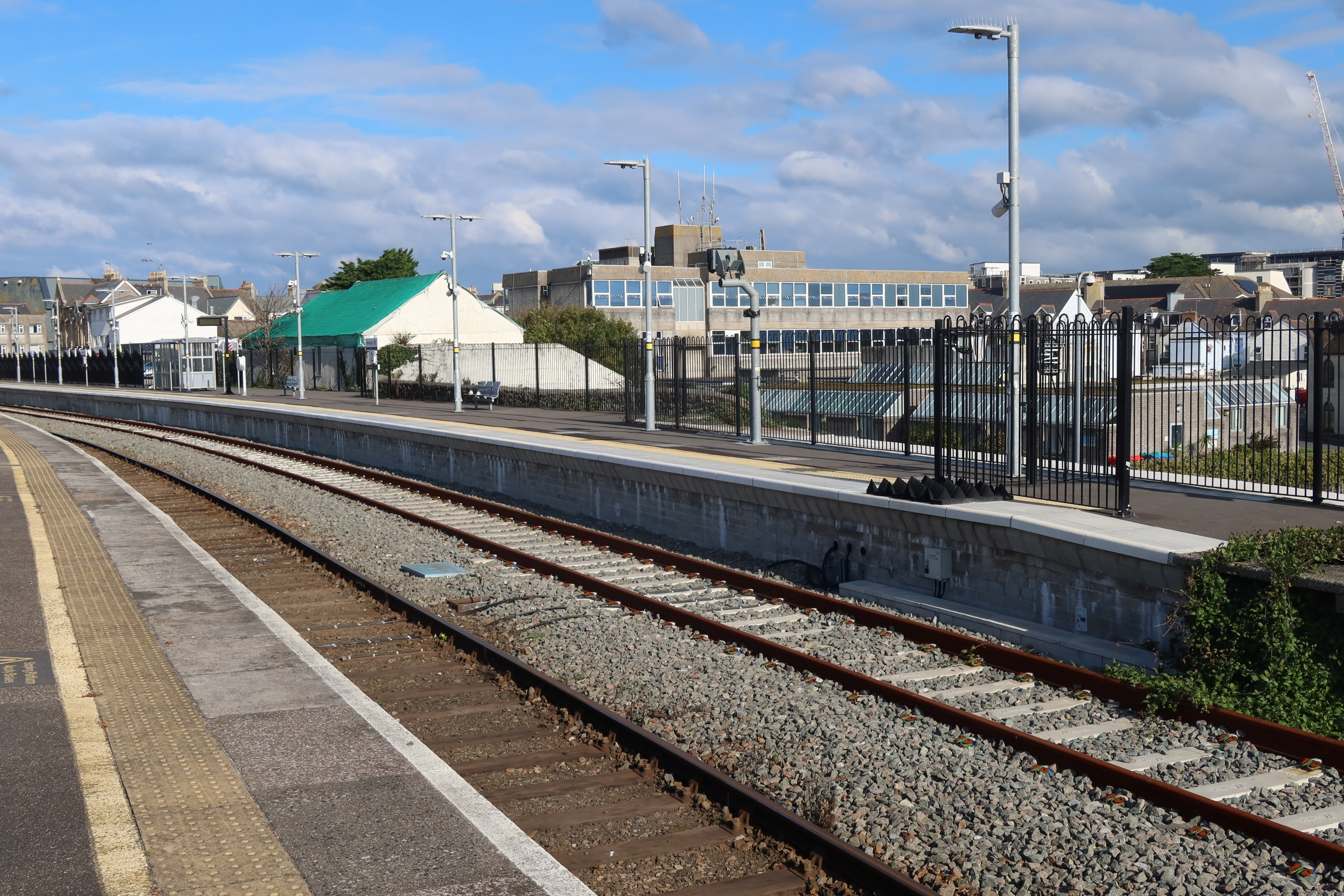
The second platform at Newquay was restored in 2025

A £56,800,000 scheme (Note: The Mid Cornwall Metro scheme funding included almost £50 million from the Government and £2.71 million from Cornwall Council) was announced in January 2023, branded as the Mid Cornwall Metro. The aim being to increase service frequency on the Atlantic Coast Line and provide through trains to St Austell, Truro and the Maritime Line to Falmouth Docks.

Engineering work at Newquay and Tregoss was completed in November 2025. This included the restoration of a second platform at Newquay, the installation of a 440 yd (400 m) passing loop at Tregoss, and new signalling equipment. On days when the line was closed for this work, viaducts between Goonbarrow Junction and St Blazey were refurbished. Additional services between Par and Newquay started operation on 17 May 2026 (Note: Although additional services between par and Newquay started running in May 2026, they do not yet run through to Truro and Falmouth) and 726 additional passengers were carried during the first week.

== Route ==
The Atlantic Coast Line starts from Par railway station on the Cornish Main Line. A curve of almost 180 degrees takes it to the former St Blazey railway station. It then climbs the Luxulyan Valley, passing underneath the Treffry Viaduct which had carried the Treffry Tramways and a water supply for Trefrry's Fowey Consols mine.

After Luxulyan, the line passes close to several former and current china clay works, before passing through Bugle and Roche stations.

Between Roche and St Columb Road stations, the line passes through Goss Moor nature reserve, where a low bridge carrying the railway over the A30 road had been the site of accidents when vehicles collided with it. There was a 1986 proposal to abolish the bridge by diverting the line so that trains would have started from St Austell railway station and continued via Burngullow and the old Newquay and Cornwall Junction Railway freight-only line, joining the current route between Roche and St Columb Road at St Dennis Junction. This proposal was later abandoned after a new route for the road was found that avoids the bridge.

After St Columb Road, the line passes through the last intermediate station at Quintrell Downs before reaching the terminus at Newquay.

== Operation ==
The line is single from St Blazey to Newquay, apart from two passing loops, at Goonbarrow Junction, just south of Bugle, and Goss Moor, between Roche and St Columb Road. The Goonbarrow Junction loop is used by china clay traffic and passenger trains when need to pass during summer timetable. It uses semaphore signals. The Goss Moor passing loop was opened in 2025 to allow long-distance and local passenger trains to run on the line concurrently during the summer timetable, and enable an hourly frequency to Newquay through the year.

=== Passenger services ===
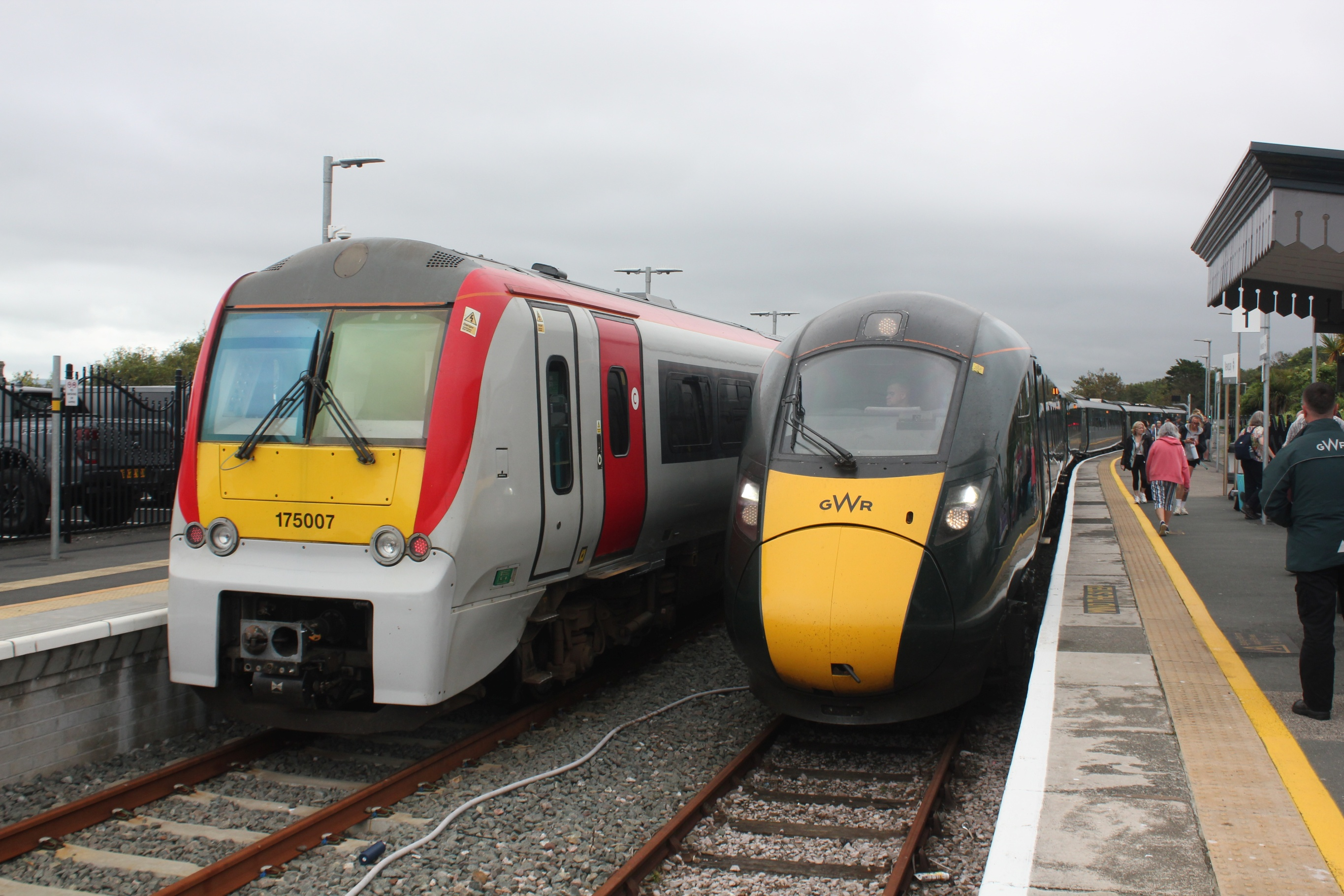
Class 175 and Class 802 units at Newquay during the summer timetable in 2026

All passenger services are operated by Great Western Railway. All local stopping services are operated by Class 150 and Class 175 units. The new infrastructure as part of the Mid Cornwall Metro means that an hourly service between Par and Newquay now operates, calling alternately at St Columb Road station and Roche,Bugle,and Luxulyan stations during most of the day . During the summer timetable there are some through services from to and from London Paddington operated by Class 800 and Class 802 units alongside the local services.

Through trains to and from London Paddington during the summer timetable have always been part of the service on the line, having originated as far as back as 1906. These operated typically during summer Saturdays, but more recent years have seen additions to this; with a through service between London and Newquay on weekdays during July and August first being added in 2007, alongside the summer Saturday summer Sundays services. Select services of these were named the Atlantic Coast Express, a name which had been introduced in 1987 when InterCity 125 High Speed Trains started serving Newquay.

CrossCountry also operated on the line on summer weekends until 2020, with trains to and from Northern England. All express services do not call at intermediate stations on the branch line, instead running non-stop between Par and Newquay.

=== Freight services ===
The eastern section of the line - as far as Goonbarrow Junction - sees some china clay traffic. This is worked by GB Railfreight who took over the contract from DB Cargo on 1 April 2026. A freight spur connects the line at St Blazey with Par Harbour, passing under the main line from Par to St Austell to reach the harbour.

== Passenger volume ==
The busiest station on the line is Newquay, where about seven times more passengers arrive and depart than the other stations added together.

Station usage
Station name	2002–03	2004–05	2005–06	2006–07	2007–08	2008–09	2009–10	2010–11	2011–12	2012–13	2013–14	2014–15	2015–16	2016–17	2017–18	2018–19	2019–20	2020–21	2021–22	2022–23	2023–24	2024–25
Luxulyan	1,005	791	1,160	1,252	922	1,214	1,372	1,420	1,836	1,428	1,654	2,170	1,904	2,404	2,394	1,770	1,470	744	1,696	2,522	2,660	3,196
Bugle	836	1,362	1,661	1,691	1,557	2,606	3,694	3,650	5,902	6,762	6,810	5,554	4,342	4,462	4,766	5,616	4,794	2,412	6,390	6,620	6,342	6,528
Roche	574	1,137	1,222	1,041	1,123	1,242	1,570	2,144	2,720	1,700	1,950	2,310	2,556	4,176	4,674	5,090	3,612	1,564	5,012	4,908	5,418	5,230
St Columb Road	813	733	1,031	1,390	783	1,222	1,590	1,966	1,792	1,548	2,188	1,904	1,684	1,878	1,858	1,936	1,840	1,200	2,662	2,794	3,396	3,542
Quintrell Downs	879	918	928	794	334	578	974	1,270	1,304	814	1,286	1,394	1,582	2,342	2,460	2,684	2,412	1,088	2,804	3,038	3,374	3,514
Newquay	76,103	83,712	71,301	77,188	87,550	126,244	102,232	100,252	115,354	104,504	97,278	100,208	95,478	102,990	108,308	103,172	97,136	34,158	108,954	129,848	125,402	125,534
The annual passenger usage is based on sales of tickets in stated financial years from Office of Rail and Road estimates of station usage. The statistics are for passengers arriving and departing from each station and cover twelve-month periods that start in April. Methodology may vary year on year. Usage since the period 2019–20 have been affected by the COVID-19 pandemic, especially the period 2020–23.

The statistics cover twelve month periods that start in April.

== Accidents and incidents ==
19 April 1984: a train derailed between St Blazey and Par. St Blazey, which had closed some 50 years earlier, was used as a temporary terminus for Newquay trains.

25 May 1991: the first train of the day from Newquay to London Paddington derailed in the Luxulyan Valley. The train was formed of a High Speed Train. The passengers were transferred to the rear power car which was then uncoupled and run slowly back to Luxulyan railway station where the passengers were transferred to road vehicles to continue their journey.

9 March 2005: the 18th wagon of a Goonbarrow to Fowey Docks china clay freight train derailed at the lower end of the valley on Prideaux Viaduct, with the next 14 wagons also derailing. The driver had felt the judder and applied the brakes but the train continued on for a further 115 metres (377 ft) before stopping causing extensive track damage beyond the viaduct, leaving some of the wagons hanging precariously over the edge of the embankment and in danger of sliding into the river. All the wagons stayed coupled together.

30 December 2006: heavy rainfall caused a landslide on an embankment near St Blazey, blocking the line. A replacement bus service was run to cover for the passenger service, until the line reopened on 8 January 2007.

On 12 June 2007 a train collided with a car at Chapel level crossing, on the outskirts of Newquay. The crossing is an Automatic Open Level Crossing, where warning lights and a siren give warning of the approach of trains but no barrier is provided. The siren and lights were found to be working. The car driver was injured, but no-one on the train was hurt.

== Community rail ==
The Atlantic Coast Line is one of the routes covered by the Devon and Cornwall Rail Partnership, an organisation formed in 1991 to promote railway services in the area. The line is publicised in several ways, including regular timetable and scenic line guides as well as leaflets highlighting attractions on the route. The Atlantic Coast Line rail ale trail was launched in 2005 to encourage rail travellers to visit pubs near the line. There are three in Newquay, one at St Columb Road, five in and around Par, and two at Quintrell Downs, one each at Roche, Bugle and Luxulyan. With 10 stamps, people can claim a free tour shirt.

The local passenger service on the line was designated by the Department for Transport as a community rail service in September 2006. This aims to increase the number of passengers and reduce costs and includes the investigation of how to get a better spread of train times during the day, and how to increase train services in the peak summer season. The line itself is not a community railway (unlike the other Cornish branches) because it also carries intercity trains during the summer and freight trains throughout the year.

Focal, a local "friends of the line" group helped to achieve a 75% increase in Par to Newquay passenger services through negotiation and cooperation with the Devon & Cornwall Rail Partnership and Great Western Railway.
