= Newquay railway station =

Railway station in Cornwall, England

Newquay Tewynblustri
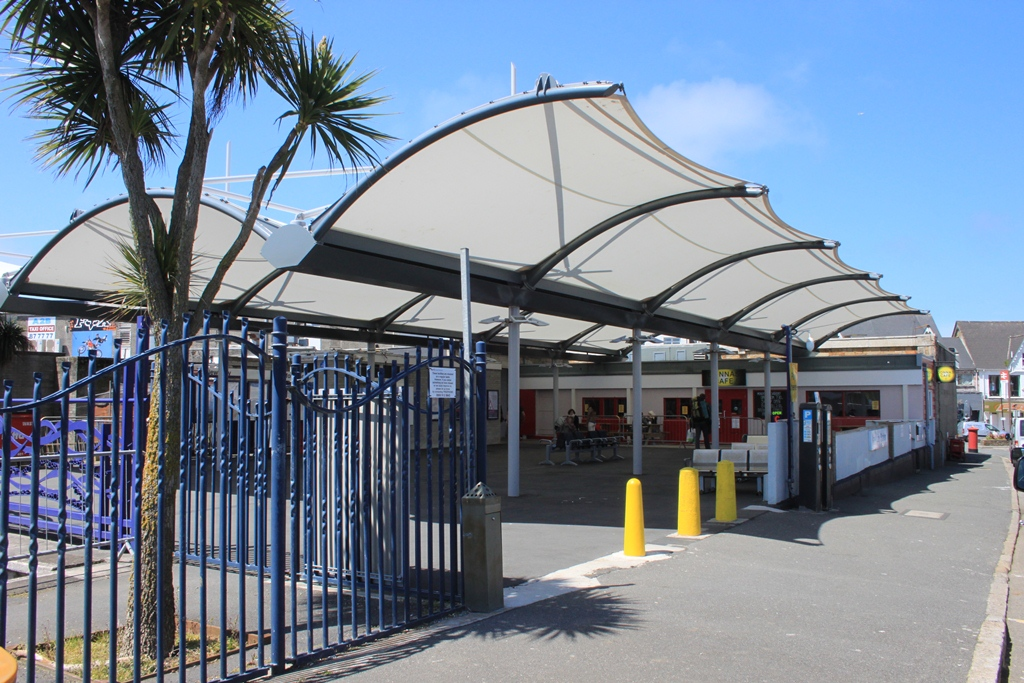

General information
- Location: Newquay, Cornwall; England
- Coordinates: 50.415°N 5.075°W
- Grid reference: SW815617
- Managed by: Great Western Railway
- Platforms: 2

Other information
- Station code: NQY
- Classification: DfT category F1

History
- Rebuilt: 1987
- Original company: Cornwall Minerals Ry
- Pre-grouping: Great Western Railway
- Post-grouping: Great Western Railway

Key dates
- 1876: Opened
- 1905: Station rebuilt Truro line opened
- 1963: Truro line closed
- 1987: Reduced to one platform
- 2025: Increased to two platforms

Passengers
- 2020/21: ▼34,158
- 2021/22: ▲108,954
- 2022/23: ▲129,848
- 2023/24: ▼125,402
- 2024/25: ▲125,534
Location
Notes
- Passenger statistics from the Office of Rail and Road

Newquay railway station (Cornish: Tewynblustri) serves the town and seaside resort of Newquay in Cornwall, England. It is the terminus of the Atlantic Coast Line from Par, 302 miles 49 chains (302.61 miles, 487.01 km) from the zero point at London Paddington measured via Box and Plymouth Millbay. The station is situated in the heart of Newquay, close to the town centre itself and the beaches. The station is managed by Great Western Railway which operates local branch line services to and from Par. In the summer, there are also services to and from London.

== History ==
The first railway at Newquay was a horse-worked line from the harbour to Hendra Crazey. It was built by Joseph Treffry in stages between 1846 and 1849. The line was extended on 1 June 1874 by the Cornwall Minerals Railway, with goods trains now reaching Fowey. A branch line from Tolcarn Junction, just outside Newquay, ran to Gravel Hill Mine near Treamble where there was an iron mine.

Passenger trains were introduced on 20 June 1876. The Great Western Railway (GWR) operated all the trains from 1 October 1877 and bought out the Cornwall Minerals Railway on 1 July 1896.

The London & South Western Railway Company (LSWR) hoped to extend the North Cornwall Railway from Padstow station to Newquay and on to Truro station, with running powers over the GWR lines from Truro to Penzance. While these efforts came to nothing, the prospect of LSWR expansion along the north coast to Newqauy and on to Penzance prompted the Great Western Railway to expand provisions in the area.

On 2 January 1905, the GWR opened the Truro and Newquay line, which allowed a new service to run from Newquay to Truro via Shepherds and Perranporth. The following year through carriages started to be run from London using the Newquay Branchline from Par. The original station had just a single platform and a turntable at the end of the platform was used to release locomotives from incoming trains. The station was rebuilt in 1905 with two platforms serving three tracks.

The main departure platform was lengthened in 1928 and again in 1935; the second platform was lengthened in 1938. These enlargements were to accommodate the longer trains that were now bringing holidaymakers from London and elsewhere. Extensive carriage sidings were laid on the south side of the station to store these trains between services.

The station began to decline following the closure of the Truro–Newquay line on 4 February 1963. The goods yard was closed in 1965; the roof on platforms 2 and 3 was removed in 1964. Platform 3 was shortened in 1966 and its locomotive release line taken out of use on 4 October 1972, by which time four of the carriage sidings had been removed.

On 5 October 1987 the signal box was closed, all the remaining signals were dismantled and the rails serving platform 1 were lifted. At the same time the last of the carriage sidings were closed and lifted. The track beside the former platform 3 was kept as a siding until the mid-1990s.

The sole remaining platform was resurfaced across its entire length in early 2012, and the former station canopies have been replaced by a new 25 metres (27 yd) by 17 metres (19 yd) wave-shaped canopy above the concourse.

Until 2020, Newquay was served by CrossCountry services from the North of England on summer weekends.

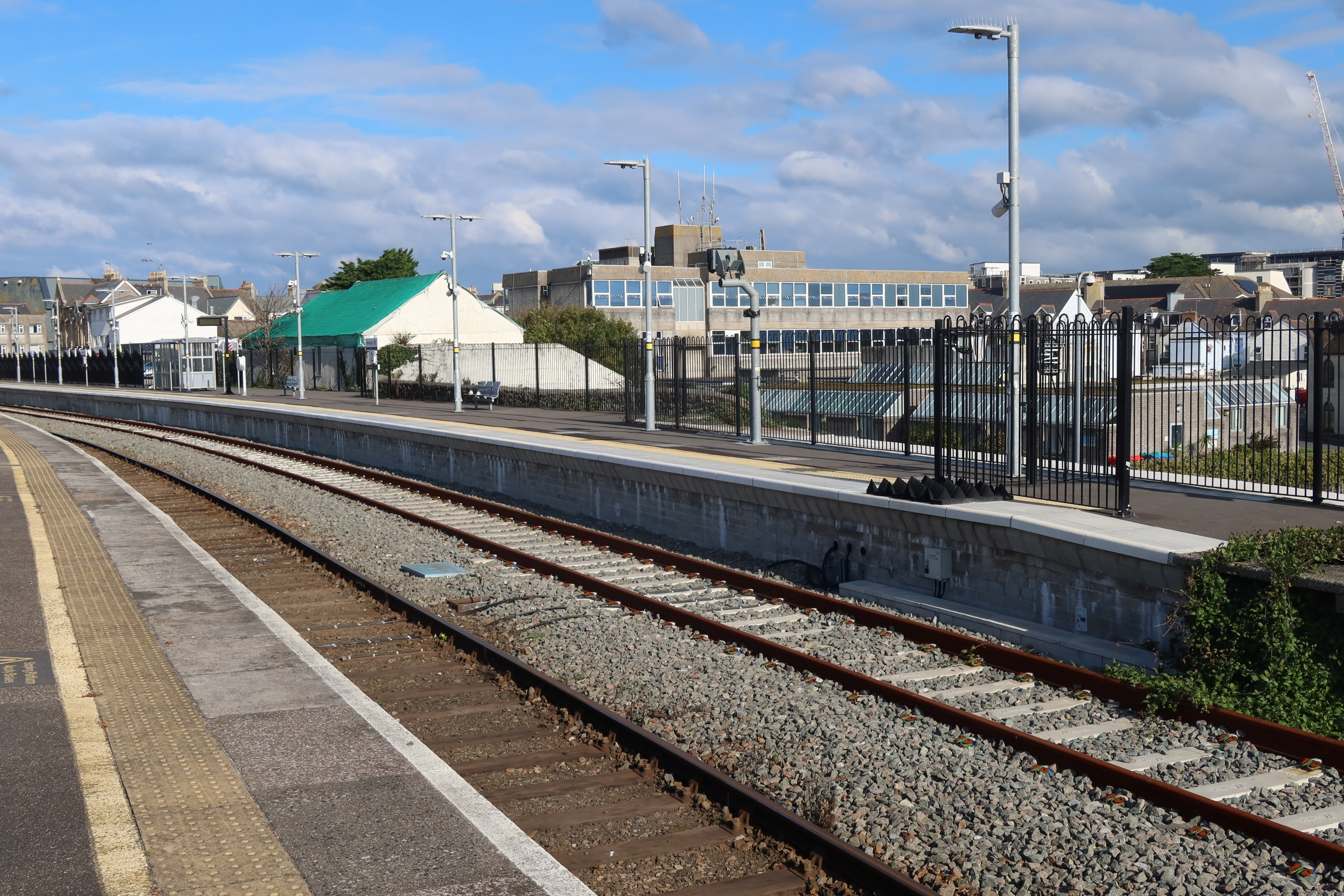
The restored second platform in 2025

As a part of the Mid Cornwall Metro project, Government funding was announced in January 2023 to reinstate the second platform at Newquay station and make other improvements to the station, such as a larger concourse, ticket machines, platform canopies and a bus interchange. The restored platform, in addition to other rail improvements of the Mid Cornwall Metro would allow hourly services to continue beyond Par to Truro and Falmouth Docks. Part of the closed platform was rebuilt in the autumn of 2024 and reopened in November 2025 in preparation for increasing the service frequency in the future.

=== Newquay Harbour ===
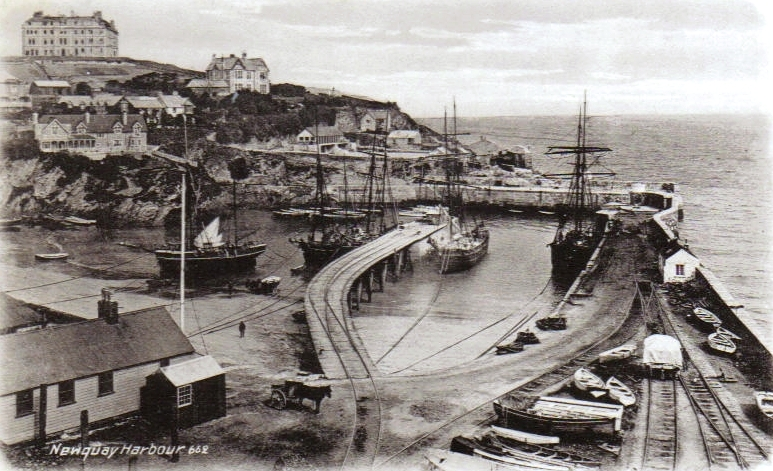
The rail network at the harbour

The original terminus of the Newquay Railway was at Newquay Harbour. Horses hauled wagons along a line that wound between houses to reach the top of a 1 in 4½ incline that carried the line down to the harbour. Wagons were lowered on a cable down the incline, which was in a tunnel dug out of the cliff. At the foot the track ran onto the eastern breakwater but a shunt-back and wooden trestle bridge gave access to the stone jetty in the middle of the harbour.

After steam locomotives were introduced by the Cornwall Minerals Railway in 1874, wagons continued to be moved between Newquay railway station and the harbour incline by horses. Traffic handled at the harbour gradually declined and the line was closed in 1925 and lifted in 1926. Part of the route is now a footpath from opposite the station to the cliff tops above the beach.

=== Trenance Viaduct ===
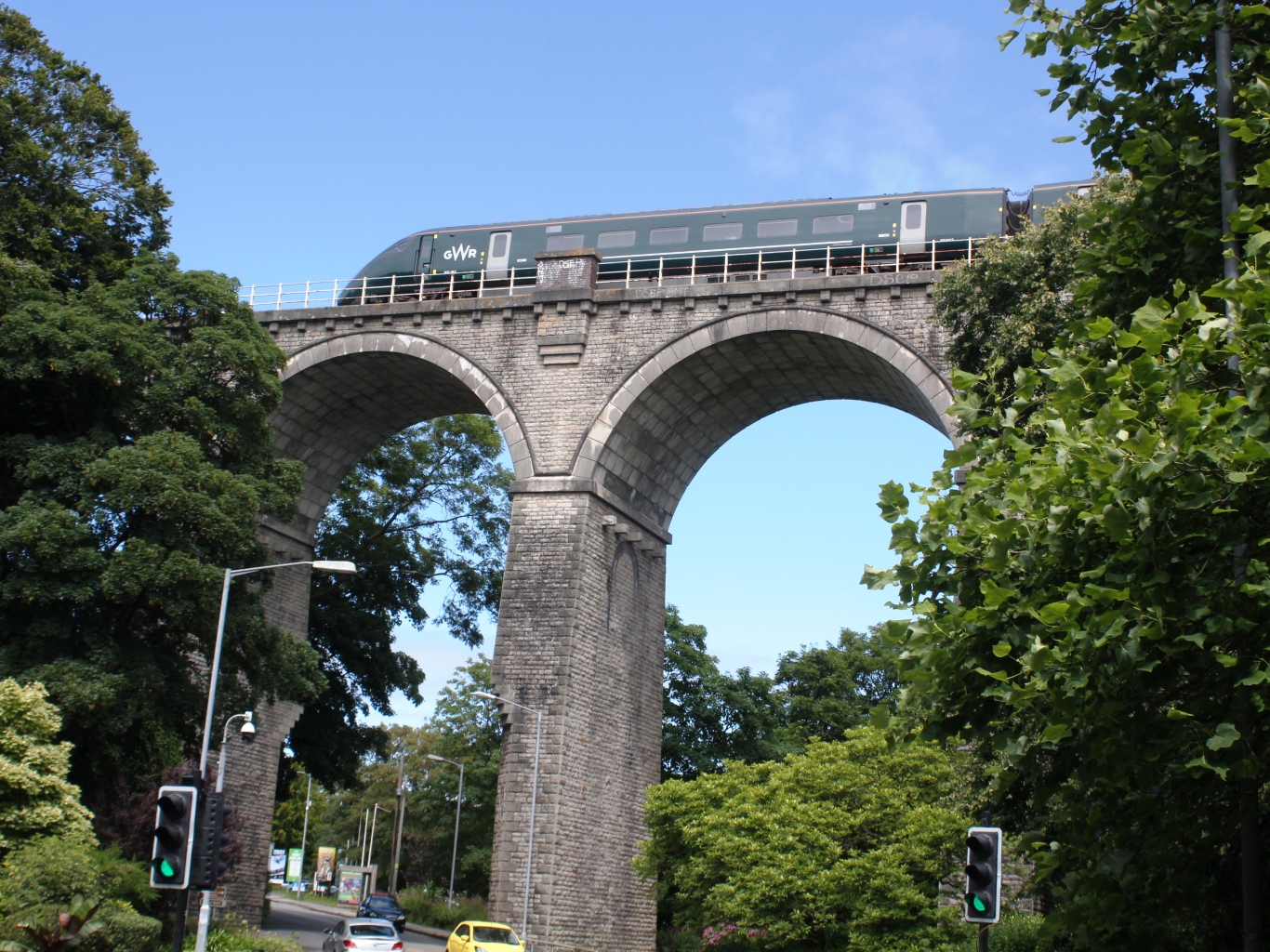
Trenance Viaduct

Between Newquay station and Tolcarn Junction the line crosses the Trenance valley on a 154-yard (141m) viaduct. The first structure, opened on 29 January 1849, was a timber structure on stone piers. It was much lighter than the similarly constructed Cornwall Railway viaducts that were built a few years later, and very different from the imposing granite Treffry Viaduct built by Treffry for his Par tramway.

The piers were raised and new wrought iron girders installed ready for the opening of the line for locomotives in 1874. This was replaced by the present masonry structure on 27 March 1939. It carried two tracks from 20 March 1946; the line to Tolcarn Junction was singled on 23 November 1964 but the second line was retained for shunting purposes until the rationalisation in the 1980s.

== Facilities ==
The station is unstaffed but has ticket machines. There is car and bicycle parking.

== Services ==
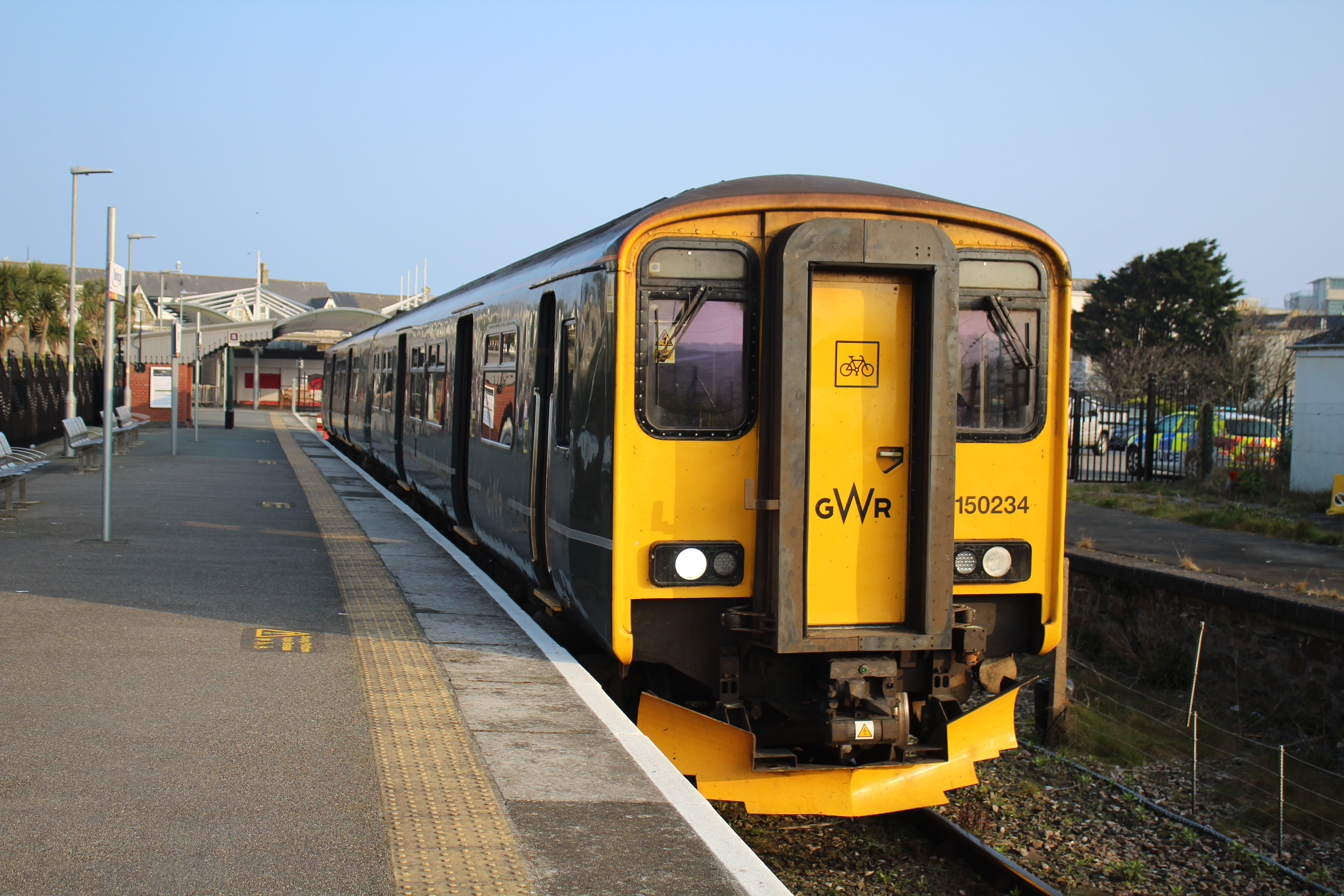
A Class 150 with a morning service to Par

From May 2026 the Great Western Railway local service runs hourly and there are some summer through services rom London Paddington.

Preceding station	National Rail	Following station
Terminus	Great Western Railway Atlantic Coast Line	Quintrell Downs towards Par
Disused railways
Terminus	Great Western Railway; Truro and Newquay Railway	Trewerry and Trerice Halt

== Community rail ==
The local trains between Par and Newquay are designated as a community rail service, supported by marketing from the Devon and Cornwall Rail Partnership. The route is promoted as the "Atlantic Coast Line". Three pubs in Newquay take part in the Atlantic Coast Line rail ale trail.

This station offers access to the South West Coast Path
Distance to path	50 yards (46 m)
Next station anticlockwise	Hayle 35 miles (56 km)
Next station clockwise	Barnstaple 123 miles (198 km)
