= Par railway station =

Railway station in Cornwall, England

Par Porth
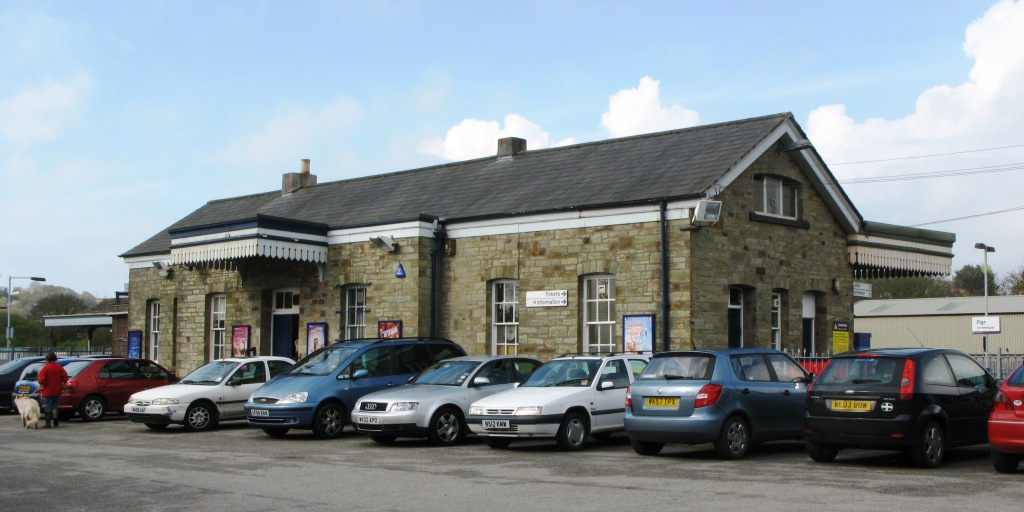

General information
- Location: Par, Cornwall; England
- Coordinates: 50.355°N 4.705°W
- Grid reference: SX077541
- Manager: Great Western Railway
- Platforms: 3

Other information
- Station code: PAR
- Classification: DfT category E

History
- Original company: Cornwall Railway
- Pre-grouping: Great Western Railway
- Post-grouping: Great Western Railway

Key dates
- 1859: Opened
- 1879: Line to Newquay opened

Passengers
- 2021/22: ▲0.183 million
- Interchange: ▲85,334
- 2022/23: ▲0.195 million
- Interchange: ▲106,235
- 2023/24: ▲0.205 million
- Interchange: ▼101,937
- 2024/25: ▲0.223 million
- Interchange: ▼101,405
- 2025/26: ▲0.235 million
- Interchange: ▲108,479
Location
Notes
- Passenger statistics from the Office of Rail and Road

Par railway station (Cornish: Porth) serves the villages of Par, Tywardreath and St Blazey, Cornwall, England. The station is 281 miles 66 chains (281.82 mi; 453.6 km) down the line from London Paddington, measured via Box and Plymouth Millbay. It is the junction for the Atlantic Coast Line to Newquay. The station is managed by Great Western Railway, which serves the station alongside CrossCountry.

== History ==
The station opened with the Cornwall Railway on 4 May 1859. The West Briton and Cornwall Advertiser reported at the time that it

is situated on the western side of Par bay, about a mile from the pier head, close to the road to Fowey and Tywardreath, the traffic of which places as well as St Blazey and the neighbourhoods intended to receive here. The departure and arrival stations are spacious edifices, both having verandahs projecting over the platforms, with convenient waiting rooms, ticket office, porter and lamp rooms, and other necessary conveniences. A goods station has not yet been erected, but considering the amount of business likely to be transacted here it is more than probable that a goods shed will be required before long.

The goods shed was approved by the directors on 10 February 1860 and was built of stone.

The station was too small to warrant a station master, but the "booking constable" was paid an additional 22 pounds each year by the Post Office to also act as a post master. Two cottages were built just outside the station to house railway staff.

In October 1877 during a storm, the roofs of the passenger buildings and goods sheds were torn off.

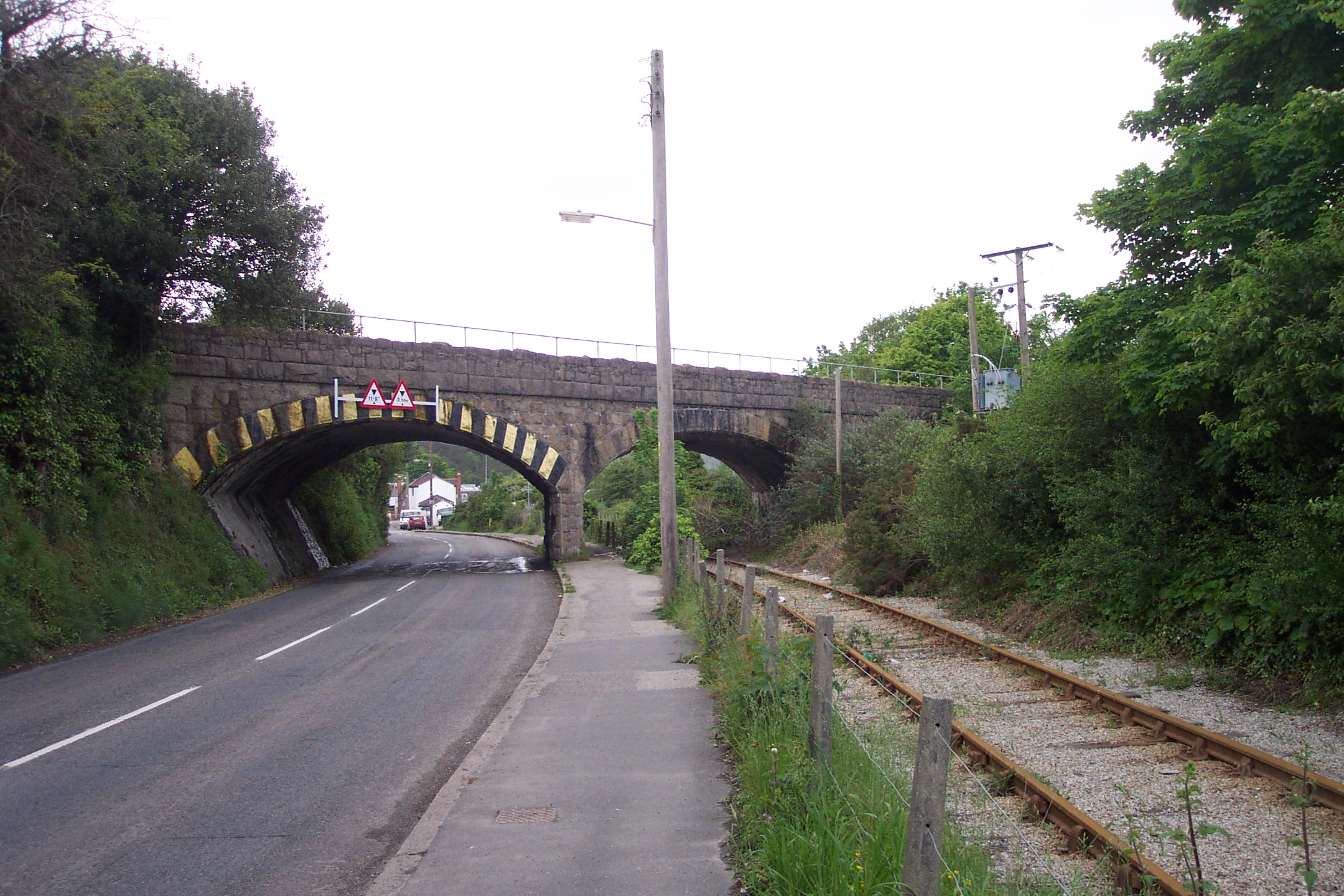
Par Viaduct was built to carry the Cornwall Railway over the Cornwall Minerals Railway route to Par harbour, a short distance south of Par station

A connection from Par to the Cornwall Minerals Railway line to Newquay was opened on 1 January 1879. This was standard gauge and so traffic between this and the broad gauge Cornwall Railway had to be transferred between trains at Par until the broad gauge was converted over the weekend of 21 May 1892. New station buildings were erected in 1884.

The Cornwall Railway was amalgamated into the Great Western Railway on 1 July 1889. The Great Western Railway was nationalised into British Railways from 1 January 1948. This in turn was privatised in the 1990s.

On 19 May 1968 an experimental Freightliner terminal was opened on the site of the now demolished goods shed. Containers were switched between rail and road vehicles; mainly china clay traffic was handled but this did not preclude other goods. It only lasted for a couple of years.

== Location ==
The line approaching Par from London and Plymouth descends an incline from Treverrin Tunnel, before passing under a road overbridge adjacent to the Royal Inn, which at one time was the Station Hotel. Between the bridge and the station approach are two cottages that were originally built as accommodation for railway workers.

The main line climbs up as it leaves the station towards St Austell, passing over Par Viaduct and Par Harbour. Trains on the Newquay branch traverse a sharp curve of almost 180 degrees where the line then passes St Blazey Freight Yard and the old platforms of St Blazey railway station, which also has a signal box which is still open. The line then joins the route of the former Cornwall Minerals Railway north to their destination. A freight spur follows the line of the old minerals railway south into Par Harbour, passing under Par Viaduct and the main line as it does so.

== Description ==
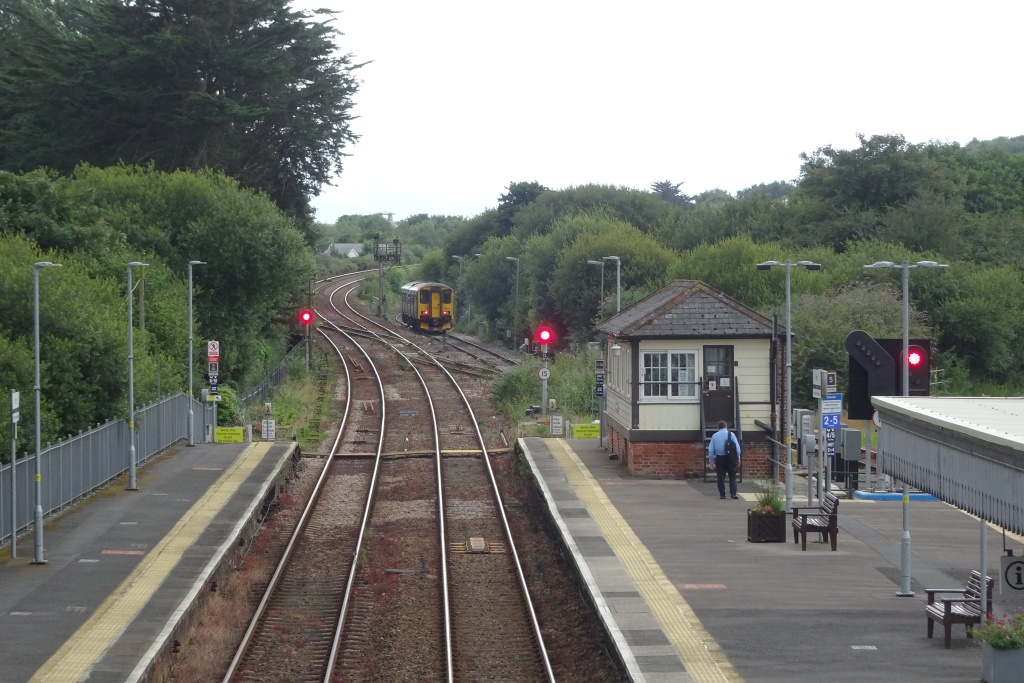
View from the footbridge looking west

The station has three platforms:

- Platform 1 for down trains to St Austell, Truro and Penzance.
- Platform 2 for up trains to Plymouth, Exeter and London Paddington.
- Platform 3 for trains to and from Newquay and other destinations particularly during the summer months

Platform 1 is directly accessed from the station entrance and car park, and the main station buildings (including staff accommodation and a part-day-staffed ticket office) dating from 1879 are on this platform, as is a passenger-operated self-service ticket machine. Access to platforms 2 and 3 is via a footbridge, with platforms 2 and 3 being an island platform. Currently, there is no step-free access from platform 1 to platforms 2 and 3, however, there are plans and funding in place to build a new accessible footbridge with lifts at the station as part of the Mid Cornwall Metro project.

Platforms 2 and 3 are also fully bi-directional platforms and any trains heading to and from Penzance are able to use both platforms if required operationally. This also means that any trains arriving in on either platform can terminate to head back in that direction again if they are needed to do so. The re-signalling work completed in 2024 meant a new signal was installed at the west end of platform 2 allowing this platform to be used for any trains heading west.

== Services ==
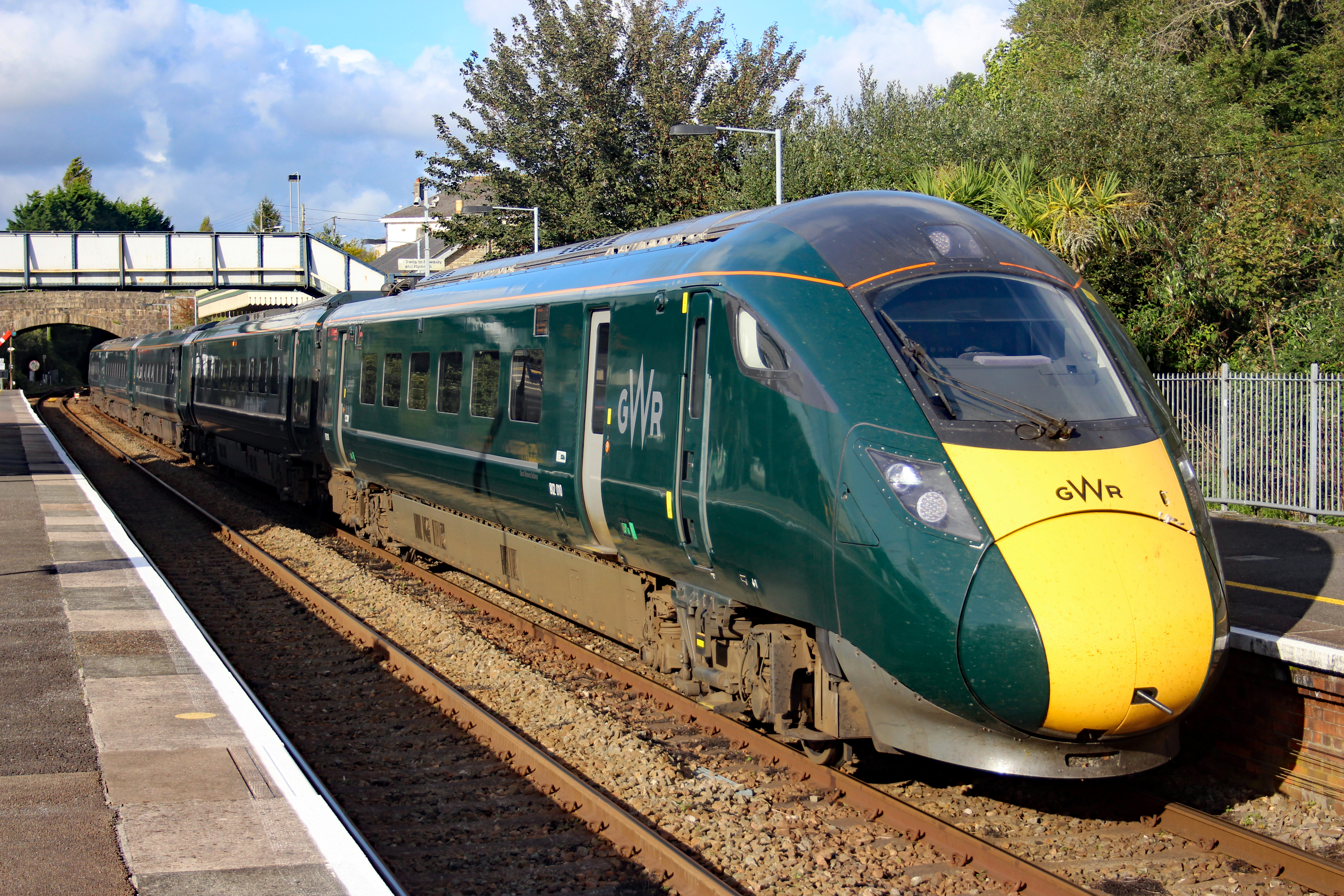
A Class 802 with a service to Penzance

Par is served by two train operating companies, which provide the following general off-peak service pattern in trains per hour/day (tph/tpd):

Great Western Railway

- 2 tph to Penzance
- 2 tph to Plymouth; of which:
  - 1 tp2h continues to Exeter St Davids
  - 1 tp2h continues to London Paddington, via Exeter St Davids, Taunton and Reading
- 1 tph to Newquay, on the Atlantic Coast Line

During the summer timetable, some branch line trains to and from Newquay are through services to and from Bristol Temple Meads and London Paddington.

The Night Riviera sleeper:

- 1 tpd to Penzance
- 1 tpd to London Paddington (does not call on Sunday nights)

CrossCountry:

- 2 tpd to Penzance
- 1 tpd to Edinburgh Waverley, via Bristol Temple Meads, Birmingham New Street, Leeds and York
- 1 tpd to Birmingham New Street (to Bristol Temple Meads on a Saturday and Plymouth on a Sunday)

Preceding station	National Rail	Following station
St Austell	Great Western Railway; Cornish Main Line	Lostwithiel
St Austell	CrossCountry; Cornish Main Line	Lostwithiel
Luxulyan towards Newquay	Great Western Railway Atlantic Coast Line	Terminus

== Signalling ==
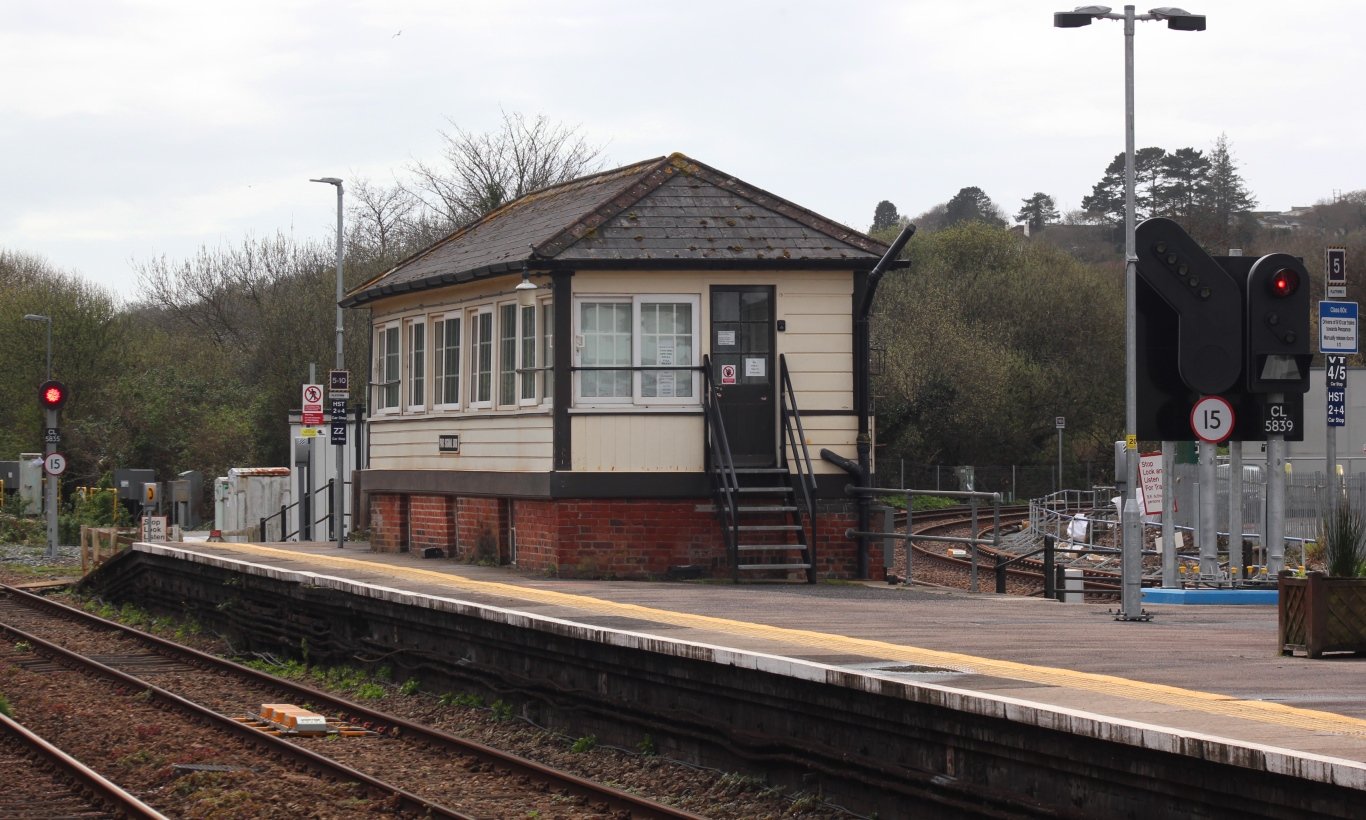
Par signal box among the new signalling at the station

The signal box is located at the southern end of Platform 2 and opened in 1879. When it was first built it was less than half its current length. The original box only contained 26 levers, but the frame was replaced in 1913 when 57 more levers were added. A panel was then added to control the section through to St Austell and Burngullow as far west as the now closed Probus and Ladock railway station. Signals controlled from Par carried the identification code 'PR'.

During 2023–24, re-signalling works were done to replace the semaphore signals with colour-light signals at the station. Following the commissioning of this, the station signalling is now controlled by the new Mid-Cornwall Workstation at Exeter Panel Signal Box. Mid-Cornwall also now operates the signalling in areas formerly controlled by Truro signal box and Lostwithiel signal box. The branch line to Newquay is continued to be operated by St Blazey and Goonbarrow signal boxes respectively, still with semaphore signalling in places.

The final stages of the re-signalling work meant that Par signal box closed on 4 March 2024. Network Rail have since began to use the old signal box as a training facility.

== Community rail ==
The trains between Par and Newquay are designated as a community rail service and is supported by marketing provided by the Devon and Cornwall Rail Partnership. The line is promoted under the Atlantic Coast Line name.

Six pubs near Par station take part in the Atlantic Coast Line rail ale trail, including some in neighbouring Tywardreath and St Blazey.

This station offers access to the South West Coast Path
Distance to path	½ mile
Next station anticlockwise	Looe 18 miles (29 km)
Next station clockwise	Falmouth Town 38 miles (61 km)
