= Community Rail Network =

Community rail organisation in the United Kingdom

Community rail in Britain is the support of railway lines and stations by local organisations, usually through community rail partnerships (CRPs) comprising railway operators, local councils, and other community organisations, and rail user groups (RUGs). Community railways are managed to fit local circumstances recognising the need to increase revenue, reduce costs, increase community involvement and support social and economic development. The Community Rail Network (CRN), formerly known as the Association of Community Rail Partnerships (ACoRP) until April 2020, supports its fifty or so member CRPs and also offers assistance to voluntary station friends groups that support their local stations through the station adoption scheme. Since 2005 the Department for Transport has formally designated a number of railway lines as community rail schemes in order to recognise the need for different, more appropriate standards than are applied to main line railway routes, and therefore make them more cost effective.

== Community Rail Partnerships and Rail User Groups ==
- All Points West: All lines west of Swansea
- Abbey Line Community Rail Partnership: Watford Junction – St Albans Abbey
- Beds & Herts Community Rail Partnership: Bedford - St Albans City
- Bishop Line Community Rail Partnership: Darlington - Bishop Auckland
- Borderlands Line Rail Partnership: Wrexham – Bidston
- Cambrian Rail Partnership: Shrewsbury – Aberystwyth and Dovey Junction – Pwllheli
- Campaign for Borders Rail: Edinburgh – Galashiels – Carlisle
- Chase Line: Walsall - Rugeley
- Chester to Shrewsbury Rail Partnership, see Shrewsbury – Chester Rail Partnership
- Conwy Valley Rail Initiative: Llandudno – Blaenau Ffestiniog
- Community Rail Humber: Hull – Bridlington – Scarborough and Cleethorpes - Barton on Humber
- Community Rail Norfolk:
  - Norwich – Sheringham (Bittern Line)
  - Norwich – Lowestoft (Wherry Lines)
  - Norwich – Great Yarmouth (Wherry Lines)
- Cotswold Line Promotion Group: Oxford – Worcester – Hereford
- Clitheroe Line CRP: Clitheroe - Manchester Victoria
- Crewe Manchester CRP
- Derwent Valley Line Community Rail Partnership: Derby – Matlock
- Devon and Cornwall Rail Partnership:
  - Exeter - Axminster
  - Exeter – Barnstaple/Exmouth,
  - Par – Newquay,
  - Truro – Falmouth,
  - Plymouth – Gunnislake,
  - St Erth – St Ives
  - Liskeard – Looe
- East Suffolk Lines Community Rail Partnership: Ipswich - Lowestoft and Ipswich - Felixstowe
- East Lancashire Community Rail Partnership,: Colne - Preston
- Esk Valley Railway Development Co: Middlesbrough – Whitby
- Essex & South Suffolk Rail Partnership:
  - Manningtree – Harwich,
  - Marks Tey – Sudbury,
  - Thorpe-le-Soken – Walton/Clacton,
  - Southminster – Wickford
  - Witham - Braintree
- Ffestiniog Railway/Welsh Highland Railway
- Gloucestershire Community Rail Partnership
- Grantham – Skegness Community Rail Partnership (The Poacher Line) also covers Nottingham - Grantham
- Heart of Wales Line Forum: Swansea – Shrewsbury
- Heart of Wessex Rail Partnership: Bristol - Weymouth
- Hope Valley & High Peak Transport Partnership: Manchester – Sheffield, Buxton and Glossop routes
- Isle of Wight Community Rail Partnership
- Kent Community Rail Partnership
- Lakes Line Community Rail Partnership
- Leeds – Morecambe Community Rail Partnership
- Llangollen Railway
- Lymington-Brockenhurst Community Rail Partnership
- Mid Cheshire Rail Partnership: Manchester – Northwich – Chester
- Marston Vale Community Rail Partnership: Bedford - Bletchley
- Moorthorpe Station Community Development Trust
- North Cheshire Rail Users’ Group: Chester – Warrington
- North Staffordshire CRP: Derby – Stoke – Crewe
- North Yorkshire Moors Railway
- Penistone Line Partnership: Huddersfield – Sheffield
- Oxfordshire Community Rail Partnership
- Purbeck Heritage Committee: Wareham – Swanage
- Settle-Carlisle Railway Development Co: Leeds – Settle – Carlisle
- Severnside CRP: Lines around Bristol
- Shrewsbury – Chester Rail Partnership
- South Fylde Community Rail Partnership: Preston - Blackpool South
- Sussex Community Rail Partnership:
  - Ashford – Hastings
  - Oxted – Uckfield
  - Oxted – East Grinstead
  - Chichester - Gatwick
- Stranraer- Ayr Line Support Association: Ayr - Stranraer
- SwaleRail Community Partnership: Sittingbourne – Sheerness
- Three Rivers Community Rail Partnership: Lines around Southampton
- TransWilts Community Rail Partnership: Swindon - Westbury / Salisbury
- Tyne Valley Community Rail Partnership: Newcastle – Carlisle
- West of Lancashire Rail Partnership: Wigan – Southport, and Preston – Ormskirk
- Weardale Railway: Bishop Auckland - Stanhope
- Worcester Community Rail Partnership
- Yorkshire Coast Community Rail Partnership

== Station Friends ==
- Friends of Altrincham Interchange
- Friends of Altnabreac Station
- Friends of Alnmouth Station
- Ashchurch, Tewkesbury & District Rail Promotion Group
- Friends of the Barton Line
- Friends of Barnstaple Station
- Friends of Bentham Station
- Friends of Bescot Stadium station
- Friends of Blackrod Station
- Friends of Broadbottom Station
- Friends of Brandon Station
- Friends of Brading Station
- Friends of Buxton Station
- Friends of Bugle Station
- Friends of Chapel-en-le-Frith Station
- Friends of Chinley Station
- Friends of Davenport Station
- Friends of Denton Station
- Friends of Dronfield Station
- Friends of Eccles Station[5]
- Friends of Furness Vale
- Friends of Glossop Station
- Friends of Goostrey Station
- Friends of Gordon Hill Station
- Friends of Handforth Station
- Friends of Heaton Chapel Station
- Friends of Heyford Station
- Friends of Hebden Bridge Station
- Friends of Hindley Station
- Friends of Homerton Station
- Friends of Hattersley Station
- Friends of Irlam Station
- Landywood Station (Great Wyrley & Cheslyn Hay Community Group)
- Friends of Levenshulme Station
- Friends of Leamington Spa Station
- Friends of Lidlington Station
- Friends of Littleborough Station
- Friends of Market Rasen Station
- Friends of Millbrook Station
- Friends of Mytholmroyd Station
- Friends of Mossley Station
- Maghull Station Volunteers
- Friends of Patricroft Station
- Friends of Poulton Railway Station
- Friends of Penmere Station
- Plumpton Station Partnership
- Friends of Reddish North Station
- Friends of Reddish South Station
- Friends of Rose Hill Station
- Friends of Romiley Station
- Rishton Prospects Panel (Rishton Station):
- Friends of Styal Station
- Friends of Saunderton Station
- Friends of Slaithwaite Station
- Friends of Sowerby Bridge Station
- Friends of Walkden Station
- Winchelsea Station Adoption Group
- Friends of Whaley Bridge Station
- Friends of Wemyss Bay Station
- Wymondham Station Adopters

== International members ==
- DHR India Support Group
- Nenagh Rail Partnership
- Washington Area Rail Passengers Association

== Reciprocal membership ==
The Association of Community Rail Partnerships has reciprocal membership with:

- Campaign for Better Transport
- Community Transport Association
- Development Trusts Association
- Heritage Railway Association
- Sustrans
- Transform Scotland

== Designated Lines ==
The Department for Transport announced a pilot project in 2005 under their Community Rail Development Strategy, with the intention of having seven differing lines (Abbey Line, Esk Valley Line, Looe Valley Line, Penistone Line, Poacher Line, St Ives Bay Line, and Tamar Valley Line) test out different types of community rail schemes. The aims of these schemes are to:

- establish the contribution of Community Rail Development in achieving locally set objectives such as reducing road congestion and increasing accessibility
- establish the costs for the line and services
- establish the effectiveness of different methods for reducing the net financial loss of Community Rail lines by increasing revenue and reducing costs where practicable

Designation does not physically separate a line from the rest of the network or remove it from either Network Rail or franchise operation. It is not generally intended to be used as a mechanism to reopen lines or create "microfranchises", although these options may be investigated on some routes.

In addition each line has a remit agreed in a route prospectus which gives more detailed aims and objectives for each scheme, such as infrastructure improvements, new ticketing arrangements, or cooperation with other local transport operators.

The DfT has identified about fifty routes in England and Wales that would benefit from designation, covering 10% of Network Rail and some 390 stations. Some routes will only be designated as community rail services (rather than community rail lines) as the infrastructure may be used by other operators in a way that precludes designation. Not all of the CRPs mentioned above have been designated. Those that have so far are:

| Date of designation | Line | Between | Partnership | Line or service |
|---|---|---|---|---|
| July 2005 | Abbey Line | St Albans Abbey to Watford Junction | Abbey Line Community Rail Partnership | Community line |
| July 2005 | Esk Valley Line | Whitby to Middlesbrough | Esk Valley Railway Development Co | Community line |
| July 2005 | St Ives Bay Line | St Ives to St Erth | Devon and Cornwall Rail Partnership | Community line |
| September 2005 | Looe Valley Line | Looe to Liskeard | Devon and Cornwall Rail Partnership | Community line |
| September 2005 | Penistone Line | Huddersfield to Barnsley | Penistone Line Partnership | Community line |
| September 2005 | Tamar Valley Line | Gunnislake to Plymouth | Devon and Cornwall Rail Partnership | Community line |
| March 2006 | Island Line | Shanklin to Ryde Pier Head | | Community line |
| July 2006 | Derwent Valley Line | Matlock to Derby | Derwent Valley Line Community Rail Partnership | Community line |
| July 2006 | Poacher Line | Skegness to Grantham | Grantham – Skegness Community Rail Partnership | Community service |
| September 2006 | Atlantic Coast Line | Newquay to Par | Devon and Cornwall Rail Partnership | Community service |
| September 2006 | Maritime Line | Falmouth Docks to Truro | Devon and Cornwall Rail Partnership | Community line |
| September 2006 | Tarka Line | Barnstaple to Exeter Central | Devon and Cornwall Rail Partnership | Community line |
| November 2006 | East Lancashire Line | Colne to Preston | East Lancashire Community Rail Partnership | Community line |
| November 2006 | Gainsborough Line | Marks Tey to Sudbury | Essex & South Suffolk Rail Partnership | Community line |
| November 2006 | Marston Vale Line | Bedford to Bletchley | Marston Vale Community Rail Partnership | Community service |
| February 2007 | Barton Line | Barton-on-Humber to Cleethorpes | Community Rail Humber | Community line |
| February 2007 | Wherry Line | Great Yarmouth to Norwich | Community Rail Norfolk | Community service |
| February 2007 | Wherry Line | Lowestoft to Norwich | Community Rail Norfolk | Community service |
| March 2007 | Clitheroe Line | Clitheroe to Manchester Victoria | Clitheroe Line CRP | Community service |
| September 2007 | Bittern Line | Sheringham to Norwich | Community Rail Norfolk | Community line |
| September 2007 | Medway Valley Line | Strood to Paddock Wood | Kent Community Rail Partnership | Community service |
| April 2008 | Lakes Line | Windermere to Oxenholme | Lakes Line Community Rail Partnership | Community line |
| April 2008 | Severn Beach Line | Severn Beach to Bristol Temple Meads | Severnside CRP | Community service |
| April 2008 | South Fylde Line | Blackpool South to Preston | South Fylde Community Rail Partnership | Community line |
| July 2008 | Lymington Branch Line | Lymington Pier to Brockenhurst | Lymington-Brockenhurst Community Rail Partnership | Community line |
| November 2008 | North Staffordshire Line | Crewe to Derby | North Staffordshire CRP | Community service |
| September 2009 | Cumbrian Coast Line | Barrow-in-Furness to Carlisle | | Community service |
| January 2011 | Bishop Line | Bishop Auckland to Darlington | Bishop Line Community Rail Partnership | Community service |
| September 2011 | Preston to Ormskirk Line | Ormskirk to Preston | West of Lancashire Rail Partnership | Community line |
| October 2011 | Heart of Wessex Line | Weymouth to Bristol Temple Meads | Heart of Wessex Rail Partnership | Community service |
| January 2012 | Mid-Cheshire Line | Chester to Manchester Piccadilly via Northwich | Mid Cheshire Rail Partnership | Community service |
| June 2012 | Furness Line | Barrow-in-Furness to Carnforth | | Community service |
| September 2012 | Avocet Line | Exmouth to Exeter St Davids | Devon and Cornwall Rail Partnership | Community line |
| October 2012 | Bentham Line | Heysham Port/Morecambe to Leeds | Leeds – Morecambe Community Rail Partnership | Community service |
| October 2012 | Hereward Line | Ely to Peterborough | Hereward CRP | Community line |
| September 2016 | TransWilts Line | Swindon to Westbury via Melksham | TransWilts Community Rail Partnership | Community service |

== See also ==
- Third-sector railway – a type of railway company or line in Japan that operates in a somewhat similar fashion to UK-style community rail especially in rural areas, typically involving prefectural and/or municipal governments as well as private companies forming small operating companies to take over and operate otherwise low-patronage and unprofitable rail lines spun off from larger rail companies. See also: List of third-sector railway lines in Japan
