= Box railway station =

Disused railway station in England

Box
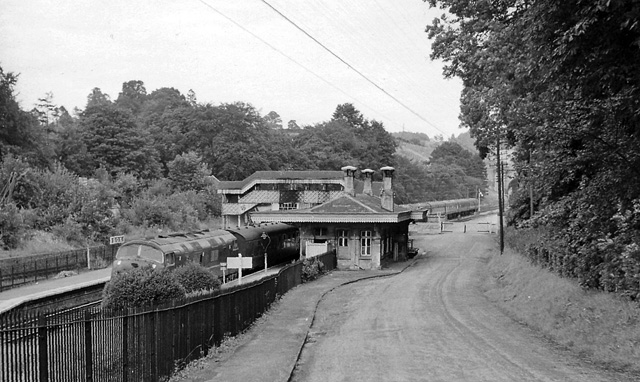
- Box railway station in 1963

General information
- Location: Box, Wiltshire; England
- Coordinates: 51.416559°N 2.268137°W
- Platforms: 2

Other information
- Status: Disused

History
- Original company: Great Western Railway

Key dates
- 30 June 1841: Opened
- 4 January 1965: Closed
Location

Box railway station served the village of Box in Wiltshire, England. The station was on the main Great Western Railway line from London to Bristol and was opened when the Chippenham to Bath section opened in June 1841.

The station was close to the village of Ashley as a location nearer to Box would have been on a steeper gradient and too close to the tunnels. The station hotel survives as the Northey Arms.

The Rev. W. Awdry, author of The Railway Series books, lived next to the railway station and spent many hours with his father watching the passing steam locomotives.

The name board of the former signal box, inscribed "Box Signal Box", is preserved in the National Railway Museum at York.

Preceding station	Historical railways	Following station
Bathford Halt; Line open, station closed	Great Western Railway; Great Western Main Line	Box (Mill Lane) Halt; Line open, station closed
