= Golant railway station =

Former railway station in England

Coordinates: 50.3614°N 4.6394°W

Golant Golnans

General information
- Location: Golant, Cornwall; England
- Platforms: 1

Other information
- Status: Disused

History
- Original company: Great Western Railway
- Pre-grouping: Great Western Railway
- Post-grouping: Great Western Railway

Key dates
- 1896: Opened
- 1965: Closed
Location

Golant railway station (Cornish: Golnans) was opened on 1 July 1896 by the Great Western Railway. It was a simple platform on the waterside at the south end of Golant village, next to a level crossing that gave access to a slipway.

It was the only intermediate station between Lostwithiel and Fowey. The line had been built by the Lostwithiel and Fowey Railway but had fallen into disuse until reopened by the Cornwall Minerals Railway which was amalgamated into the Great Western Railway on the same day that Golant was opened.

The station was unstaffed. The instructions to staff stated that "no luggage is to be labelled to Golant. Passengers who may be travelling from Golant to stations on the main line beyond Lostwithiel must re-book at that station, and have their luggage labelled to their destination at Lostwithiel."

The railway including Golant was closed to passengers through part of the Second World War as Fowey was the main port for loading ammunition for the US 29th Division that landed on Omaha Beach on D Day. There was a munitions siding at Woodgate Pill just north of Golant, originally built for the Great War conflict. In early September 1943 the US forces were unloading an average of 49 wagons of ammunition a day with a peak of 103 wagons in a day. From 6 June 1944 to the end of the month they handled DWT of 13828 tons.

The Great Western Railway was nationalised into British Railways on 1 January 1948. The passenger service was withdrawn on 4 January 1965 and the station subsequently demolished, the space now being used for a small car park.

Preceding station	Historical railways	Following station
Lostwithiel	Great Western Railway; Fowey Branch	Fowey
