= Truro and Newquay Railway =

Disused railway line in Cornwall, England

The Truro and Newquay Railway was a Great Western Railway line in Cornwall, England, designed to keep the rival London and South Western Railway (LSWR) out of the west of the county. The line was completed in 1905 and closed in 1963.

== History ==
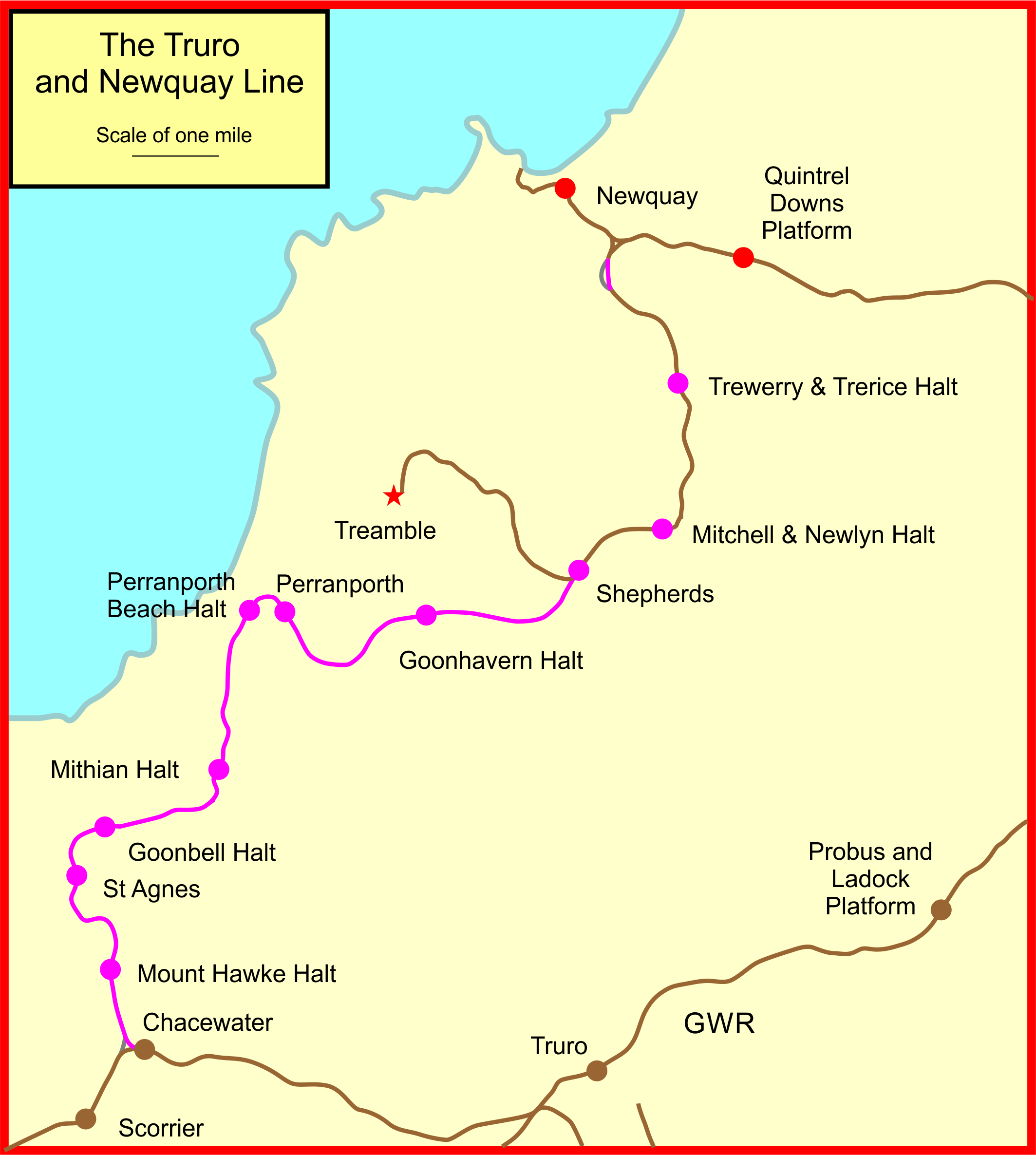
Map of Truro and Newquay Railway

The Great Western Railway (GWR) had secured dominance in south and west Cornwall from its purchase of the Cornwall Railway in 1889; it already had control of the West Cornwall Railway and therefore had a main line from London through Plymouth to Penzance, with a number of branches. It had been working the nominally independent Cornwall Minerals Railway lines, in particular the passenger route from Par to Newquay, for some years and in 1896 it acquired that network by purchase.

In the 1890s the rival London and South Western Railway (LSWR) was extending its network in north Cornwall, through the North Cornwall Railway, which was building from Launceston to Padstow: it reached Wadebridge in 1895. (Note: The LSWR had purchased the Bodmin and Wadebridge Railway in 1835 but that short local line was disconnected from the rest of the network.)

Great Western Railway (Truro and Newquay Railway) Act 1897
- Act of Parliament
- Parliament of the United Kingdom
- Long title: An Act to empower the Great Western Railway Company to make new railways in the county of Cornwall and for other purposes.
- Citation: 60 & 61 Vict. c. xii

Dates
- Royal assent: 3 June 1897

Text of statute as originally enacted

The GWR wished to secure the north-west of the county as its own territory, and responding to local demands—in particular from business interests in Perranporth, who saw their town losing out due to its remoteness from railway links—it projected the Truro and Newquay Railway. It obtained an authorising act of Parliament, the Great Western Railway (Truro and Newquay Railway) Act 1897 (60 & 61 Vict. c. xii) on 3 June 1897. The new line was to run from a triangular junction (Blackwater Junction) near Chacewater, 6 miles (10 km) west of Truro, and run via St Agnes and Perranporth to Shepherds; here the new route joined the existing Treamble goods and mineral branch, originally built by the Cornwall Minerals Railway. The branch from there to Newquay was rebuilt for passenger operation, including a short alteration to eliminate a sharp curve, the Trevemper Deviation. Near Newquay the branch joined the Par line at Tolcarn Junction, which was also triangular.

The new construction was 12 miles (19 km) in extent, and the upgraded portion from Shepherds was 5 miles (8.0 km). Trains left Truro on the Cornish Main Line as far as Chacewater railway station and Blackwater Junction, where the new line turned northwards to reach the coast near St Agnes. It then turned north-eastwards to Perranporth and then turned inland to Shepherds on the former Cornwall Minerals Railway Newquay to Treamble branch.

Construction began in 1897, but was slow to complete; severe difficulties with subsidence were encountered near Goonhavern. The section from Blackwater to Perranporth opened on 6 July 1903, and from there to Shepherds was completed on 2 January 1905.

At first the passenger stations were St Agnes, Perranporth, and Shepherds, but six halts were opened on 14 August 1905, partly in connection with the GWR's adoption of railmotors, integrated self-propelled coaches suited to lightly used local services. A new halt, Perranporth Beach Halt, was opened on 21 July 1931; the main Perranporth station was inconveniently situated for holidaymakers, a business the GWR wished to encourage.

The line was single between Blackwater and Tolcarn junctions with passing loops at the stations; it had a 40 mph (64 km/h) speed limit. There were 6 trains each way in 1910, rising to 12 by the summer of 1938. There was also a through train to London in later years, joining with a Penzance portion at Chacewater.

The area served by the line remained sparsely populated and the general decline in use of local railways as road facilities improved resulted in the closure of the line on 4 February 1963.

== Train services ==
The line ran through relatively unproductive agricultural districts, and apart from Perranporth business and the sporadic Treamble traffic, the goods traffic on the line was insignificant. The low population density encouraged the GWR to introduce the new railmotors it had developed, and from 1905 several halts were opened with minimal facilities, to enable a low-cost service outside the principal holiday period.

In the summer of 1960 there were 10 stopping trains on the line; there were seven trains on Sundays. About half the trains ran to and from Truro, several of these being quoted as through to or from Falmouth. On summer Saturdays there was a through train from Perranporth (08:15) to Paddington (arrive 15:55), calling only at St Agnes, Truro (set down), St Austell and Par (both pick up only); in the down direction the 08:25 Paddington train, making more conventional stops, conveyed a Perranporth portion, arriving at 16:20.

== Topography ==
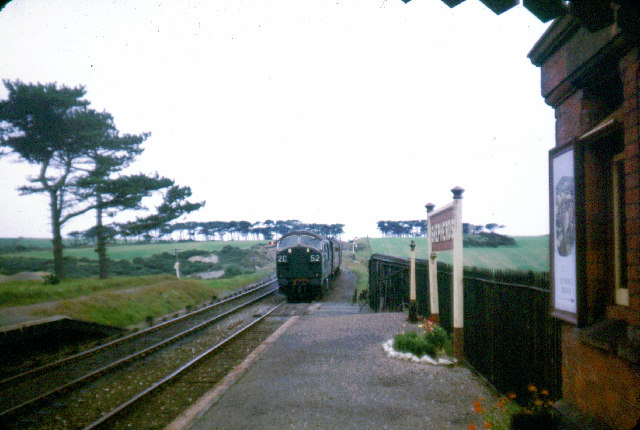
A Class 22 diesel approaching Shepherds station

Passenger trains generally ran from Truro or Chacewater to Perranporth or Newquay, but a summer service ran from Newquay towards Redruth until 1916, using the west curve at Blackwater Junction.

Chacewater station (Cornish: Dowr an Chas) (50.2638°N 5.1698°W) had opened on 1 November 1853 on the West Cornwall Railway from Truro to Penzance. A loop platform line was added behind the platform used by trains towards Truro in 1912, from which time many branch trains terminated and started there.

Blackwater Junction (50.2648°N 5.1825°W) was a triangular junction made up of Blackwater North, East and West junctions. The west curve, for trains towards Newquay from the Redruth direction, closed on 5 May 1919. On 9 November 1924 the branch was extended back to Chacewater station, parallel to the main line, enabling Blackwater (East) Junction signalbox to be abolished. The junction was closed and the branch line extended the short distance to Chacewater station on a new third track laid along the north side of the existing main line. The loop platform then served branch trains in both directions.

Mount Hawke Halt (Cornish: Mont Hawk) (50.2795°N 5.1891°W) opened on 14 August 1905. It had a single platform with a pagoda shelter, located in a cutting on the right hand side of trains going towards Newquay. The cutting containing the station site was filled in at the beginning of the 1990s.

St Agnes station (Cornish: Breanek) (50.2985°N 5.2008°W) opened with the line on 6 July 1903. Originally it had a single platform on the left of trains towards Newquay, and a small goods yard. Local dissatisfaction was expressed that the halt was some distance from the community served, the ground formation at Trevellas Coombe having prevented a closer approach. The station was host to a GWR camp coach from 1934 to 1939. A passing loop was opened on 4 July 1937, with a longer island platform. A camping coach was also positioned here by the Western Region from 1952 to 1956, two coaches from 1957 to 1961 and three in 1962. The station building at St. Agnes survives and is one of the few remaining substantial relics on this line.

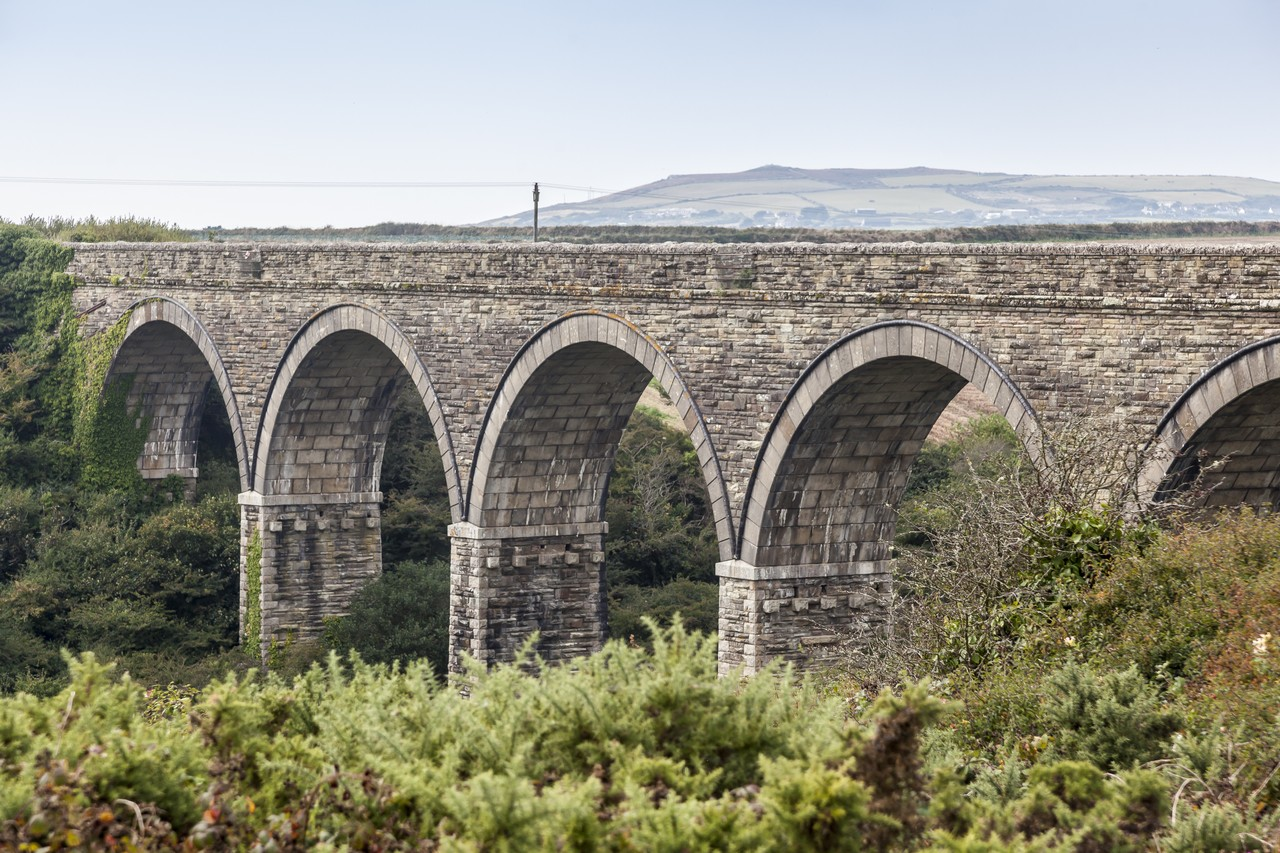
Goonbell viaduct, viewing north, with the St Agnes Beacon in the distance.

Goonbell Halt (Cornish: Goonbell) (50.3030°N 5.1919°W) was opened on 14 August 1905. Its single platform had a pagoda shelter. The halt was in a shallow cutting on the left side of trains towards Newquay. Today the cutting has been filled in but the wrought iron entrance gates survive.

The 140-yard (130 m), five-arch Goonbell Viaduct (50° 18′ 20.5″ N 5° 10′ 38.8″ W) is 3/4 mile (1.2 km) beyond the station towards Newquay, still intact and resplendent.

Mithian Halt (Cornish: Mydhyan) (50.3142°N 5.1626°W) was opened on 14 August 1905. It was on the left of trains going towards Newquay. The cutting and station area have long been long filled in and the station site is now barely traceable.

Perranporth Beach Halt (Cornish: Treth Porthperan) (50.3422°N 5.1543°W) was opened on 20 July 1931; it was the last station added to the line. It had a single platform on the right of trains heading towards Newquay. The Halt was staffed in the summer months, and in some records is referred to as Perranporth Beach Platform. After closure, the sectional concrete platform was removed and installed The Dell, subsequently renamed Falmouth Town railway station on the Maritime Line. Today only one abutment of the adjacent road overbridge remains and four houses now stand on the site of the halt.

Perranporth station (Cornish: Porthperan) (50.3424°N 5.1473°W) was the terminus of the line from 6 July 1903 until completion to Newquay on 2 January 1905; it was the only passing place between Chacewater and Shepherds until St Agnes station was extended in 1937. The platform was situated between the two running lines, and the accommodation was considerable in expectation of holiday traffic. A small goods yard with a goods shed was situated on the south (right) side of the line. 3/4 mile (1.2 km) beyond the station towards Newquay is the 89-yard (81 m) Cox or Cocks Viaduct; (50° 19′ 57.3″ N 5° 7′ 51.2″ W) it is still intact. Nothing remains of the station; an industrial estate was developed on the site during the 1970s.

Goonhavern Halt (Cornish: Goonhavar) (50.3416°N 5.1072°W) was opened on 14 August 1905, on the right of trains travelling towards Newquay. It had a pagoda shelter and a siding until 1919 for the purpose of delivering pit props for nearby mines. The halt and adjacent road bridge survived until 1983 when most of the formation of the railway was obliterated and the cutting filled in.

Shepherds station (Cornish: Bugel)

A branch from Newquay to Treamble had been opened by the Cornwall Minerals Railway on 1 June 1874. When the Truro and Newquay line was constructed a passing loop was installed with two passenger platforms, immediately west of the junction for the Treamble line, which remained a goods line. The new line and the station opened on 2 January 1905 (50.3486°N 5.0692°W). It was remote from any centre of population, and the name derived from former mine workings at the location. There was a small goods yard opposite the junction and a camping coach was later kept at the station.

The Treamble line closed in 1917 and the rails were lifted and sent to France to help with the war effort but due to an upturn in the mineral market, the line was reopened in 1926. It was again closed on 1 January 1952 although there had been no traffic over it since 8 August 1949. The track was not removed until 1956.

Mitchell and Newlyn Halt (Cornish: Pansmoren hag Eglosnywlin) (50.3577°N 5.0458°W) serving the villages of Mitchell and St Newlyn East opened on 14 August 1905. It had a single wooden platform on the left of trains going to Newquay, but this was later replaced by a concrete platform. The platform and waiting shelter may still survive amongst the undergrowth just across the road from the terminus of the Lappa Valley Railway, but are now inaccessible.

The 15 in (380 mm) gauge Lappa Valley Railway now runs on the trackbed near here.

Trewerry and Trerice Halt (Cornish: Treveri ha Trerys) (50.3818°N 5.0433°W) was opened on 14 August 1905. It had a single platform on the right of trains heading towards Newquay and was situated just west of the level crossing, east of which a siding was provided until 5 September 1948. The platform was timber-built but was later replaced by a concrete structure.

Trevemper Siding served an industrial factory; it was on a short section of the Treffry Tramways route that was by-passed when the main line was improved. After closure of the line on 4 February 1963, the Siding and the route to Tolcarn was retained until final closure on 28 October 1963.

Tolcarn Junction was a triangular junction before the time of the Truro line; it was a legacy of the Cornwall Mineral Railways traffic from East Wheal Rose to Fowey. The spur avoiding Newquay was called Treloggan Curve, and the junction nearest Perranporth was Lane Junction; that nearest Par was Newquay Junction or Treloggan Junction; that nearest Newquay was Tolcarn Junction.

Treloggan curve had been taken out of use in 1888, but it was reinstated in 1931 for the purpose of turning engines when the station turntable was abolished to enable enlargement of the siding facilities. The line from Tolcarn Junction to Newquay remained single until March 1946.

Newquay Station (Cornish: Trewynblustri)

The Newquay Railway was opened in 1846 and a passenger service provided to Fowey from 20 June 1876. The station was rebuilt with three platforms to accommodate the opening of the Truro and Newquay line; the new facilities came into use on 7 June 1905. It has since been reduced to a single track. It continues to serve Atlantic Coast Line trains from Par and a number of long-distance services on summer Saturdays.

=== Gradients ===
The line was steeply graded. Leaving Chacewater it climbed at 1 in 72 / 1 in 60 to Mount Hawke; it descended from St Agnes at 1 in 60 / 1 in 99, steepening to 2 miles (3 km) at 1 in 51 / 1 in 47 after Mithian. Leaving Perranporth it climbed for 3 miles at 1 in 64 / 1 in 45 to a summit just short of Shepherds, from where it descended for 3 miles (5 km) at 1 in 45 to a location beyond Mitchell and Newlyn. Still falling to beyond Trewerry, the last 3 miles (5 km) were relatively gentle.
