= Lostwithiel and Fowey Railway =

Railway line in Cornwall, England

Overview
- Status: Operational
- Locale: Cornwall, United Kingdom
- Termini: Lostwithiel; Fowey (closed)
- Stations: Golant (closed)

Service
- System: National Rail
- Operator: DB Schenker

History
- Opened: 1869
- Closed: 1965 to passengers remains open for freight

Technical
- Line length: 4.75 mi (7.64 km)
- Track gauge: 4 ft 8 1/2 in (1,435 mm) standard gauge
- Old gauge: 7 ft 1/4 in (2,140 mm) Brunel gauge

The Lostwithiel and Fowey Railway opened in 1869 as a broad gauge railway linking the port of Fowey in Cornwall with the Cornish Main Line at Lostwithiel. Its main traffic was china clay. The company ran into financial difficulties and closed in 1880, but the line was purchased by the Cornwall Minerals Railway and reopened in 1895.

A passenger service operated, but it was withdrawn in 1965, and the line reverted to the conveyance of china clay; it remains open for that traffic at the present day.

== Chronology ==
- 1862 Lostwithiel and Fowey Railway Act 1862 (25 & 26 Vict. c. lxix)
- 1869 Line opened
- 1874 Cornwall Minerals Railway opens from Par to Fowey
- 1880 Service suspended
- 1892 Lostwithiel and Fowey Railway Company dissolved
- 1895 Reopened by Cornwall Minerals Railway
- 1968 Par to Fowey line closed

== History ==
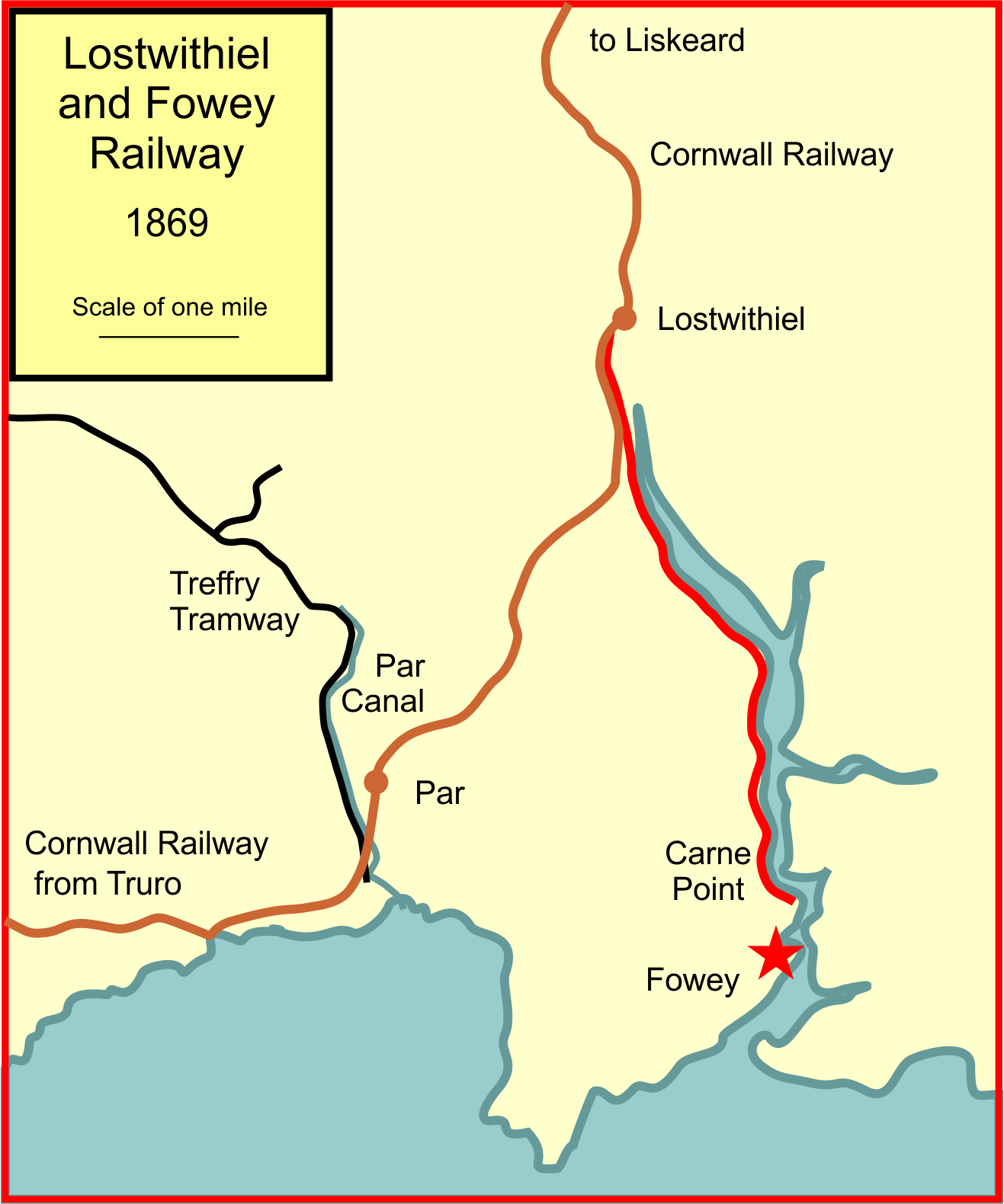
Map of Lostwithiel and Fowey Railway at opening

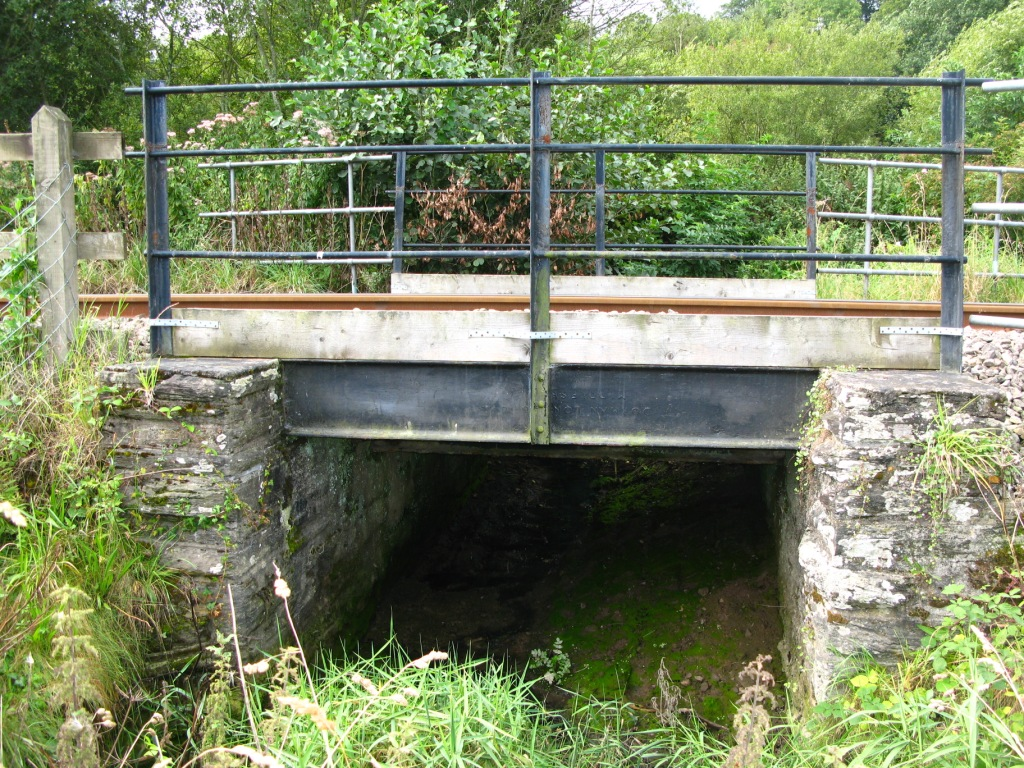
A steel underline bridge believed to be built circa 1892. It carries the Lostwithiel and Fowey branch line across a stream on Shirehall Moor at Lostwithiel

Promoters of an independent company conducted negotiations with the Cornwall Railway in 1861, regarding the construction of a branch line from that railway at Lostwithiel to a location at Caffamill Pill, Fowey, where deep water berthing was available for shipping. The route would run alongside the River Fowey and so would have gentle gradients and few engineering problems, apart from some bridges across small tributary rivers; new jetties were to be built at Carne Point, a short distance north of Fowey.

Lostwithiel and Fowey Railway Act 1862
- Act of Parliament
- Parliament of the United Kingdom
- Long title: An Act for making a Railway from the Cornwall Railway near Lostwithiel to Fowey in the County of Cornwall, and for other Purposes.
- Citation: 25 & 26 Vict. c. lxix

Dates
- Royal assent: 30 June 1862

Lostwithiel and Fowey Railway Act 1865
- Act of Parliament
- Parliament of the United Kingdom
- Long title: An Act for conferring further Powers on the Lostwithiel and Fowey Railway Company in relation to their Capital, and for other Purposes.
- Citation: 28 & 29 Vict. c. xxxix

Dates
- Royal assent: 26 May 1865

An act of Parliament, the Lostwithiel and Fowey Railway Act 1862 (25 & 26 Vict. c. lxix) was obtained on 30 June 1862 and the Lostwithiel and Fowey Railway was incorporated with capital of £30,000. The railway was to be 5 miles and 15 chains (8.4 km) in length. Money proved difficult to come by, and there was some delay in construction, and the line eventually opened on 1 June 1869, on the broad gauge. It did not carry passengers, and it was worked by the Cornwall Railway Joint Committee. There were close links with the Newquay and Cornwall Junction Railway; some directors and officers served both companies, and offices were in a shared building at Par.

The principal traffic was expected to be china clay and other minerals from the area around St Austell, but the financial performance of the company was dependent on the buoyancy of the mining activity. Difficult trading conditions were followed by the opening of a more direct route to Fowey by the Cornwall Minerals Railway on 1 June 1874, and the two companies engaged in a bitter price war.

The company's finances became increasingly strained and the necessity to reconstruct a number of timber bridges proved impossible to fund, leading to suspension of the line's activity from 1 January 1880. The line was leased to the Cornwall Railway for use as storage sidings but traffic never resumed, despite several attempts to attract new business.

Lostwithiel and Fowey Railway Act 1891
- Act of Parliament
- Parliament of the United Kingdom
- Long title: An Act to confer further powers on the Lostwithiel and Fowey Railway Company and on other Companies and for other purposes.
- Citation: 54 & 55 Vict. c. clxxiii

Dates
- Royal assent: 28 July 1891

Text of statute as originally enacted

Lostwithiel and Fowey Railway Act 1892
- Act of Parliament
- Parliament of the United Kingdom
- Long title: An Act to authorise the transfer of the undertaking of the Lostwithiel and Fowey Railway Company to the Cornwall Minerals Railway Company and for other purposes.
- Citation: 55 & 56 Vict. c. clxxxii

Dates
- Royal assent: 27 June 1892

The Cornwall Minerals Railway (CMR) itself had experienced financial difficulties and from 1 October 1877 had leased its lines to the Great Western Railway (also lessee of and operator of the Cornwall Railway), but as trade improved its income from the lease and a financial arrangement with creditors resulted in the CMR having cash available, and it made arrangements to purchase the Lostwithiel and Fowey line. The purchase was confirmed by the Lostwithiel and Fowey Railway Act 1892 (55 & 56 Vict. c. clxxxii) of 27 June 1892. The L&FR Company was dissolved and the line and jetty accommodation were transferred to the Cornwall Minerals Railway. The CMR reconstructed the line and converted it to the 4 ft 8 1/2 in (1,435 mm) standard gauge, rebuilding and extending the jetties at Carne Point also. The CMR had a Fowey station a short distance south of the L&FR terminal, and the CMR constructed a connection to link the two railways. The line reopened on 16 September 1895, for both goods and passenger traffic, and passenger trains ran to the CMR passenger station at Fowey. An intermediate station was opened at Golant.

The Cornwall Minerals Railway sold its line to the Great Western Railway, and this took effect on 1 July 1896, from which date the Lostwithiel and Fowey line was simply the Fowey branch of the GWR.

The passenger service on the line was interrupted during the First and Second World Wars (1914-18 and 1939-45). It was withdrawn from 2 April 1917 until November 1917. During the Second World War, passenger services were withdrawn once again for "security reasons". The Second World War period also enabled reuse of sidings at Woodgate Pill near Fowey, which were used to service a munitions store. Never heavily used, the passenger service from Lostwithiel to Fowey was withdrawn on 4 January 1965, and the line now carries only mineral traffic to Carne Point. The CMR line from Par to Fowey closed on 1 July 1968, and the Lostwithiel and Fowey route is now the only rail route to Fowey.

== Operation ==
=== Early years ===
An agreement was signed with the Cornwall Railway for that company to work the line once it was complete. As the line when opened in 1869 only went as far as Carne Point, and that only for goods traffic, the Cornwall Railway would not fulfil the agreement and so hired a locomotive to the railway instead. The Lostwithiel and Fowey considered this arrangement as too expensive.

In February 1870 the directors reported that the temporary arrangement made with the Cornwall for carrying on the traffic did not leave to the company sufficient profit to pay the cost of maintaining the permanent way. The directors had hired an engine — the only one they could obtain at so short a notice — it is not, however, of sufficient power, and it has become necessary to obtain a more efficient one. With this view, the directors were negotiating for the purchase or hire of an engine of greater power.

=== 20th century ===
The reopened railway was operated by 455 'Metro' class 2-4-0T locomotives until 1400 0-4-2T were deployed with an autocoach or two, an otherwise rare train type in Cornwall. 1419 was the regular locomotive but other classes worked the branch, particularly on the days when it was being serviced, and on occasion both the 6400 Class 0-6-0T and 4575 class 2-6-2T were recorded on passenger duty. Freight trains were operated by 4500 Class locomotives.

In the last few years of the passenger service, these were operated by Class 121 and Class 122 single-car DMUs.

In 1955 specific open wagons for the conveyance of China Clay were constructed at Swindon Works, and from 1974 the whole fleet of around 900 wagons were modified when a metal bar was added to raise the tarpaulins that were used when the wagons were loaded to protect the cargo, giving them the nickname "Clay Hoods". These 5-plank wooden open wagons, designated UCV, had 4 wheels with a 9 feet (2.7 m) wheelbase and vacuum brakes, and in the early 1970s the heavier freight trains to and from Carne Point were typically made up of these wagons hauled by Class 52 'Western' diesels while lighter loads were hauled by smaller Type 2 diesels, initially Class 22 hydraulics and then later by Class 25 diesel-electrics. Following the retirement of these classes of locomotive in the 1980s, trains of "Clay Hoods" were typically hauled by Class 37s and while from 1988 the old open clay wagons were replaced with 45-ton CDA hoppers with air brakes, into the 1990s the trains continued to be hauled by class 37's based at St Blazey.

=== Recent operations ===
By 2006 there was one train per day on the branch from Monday to Saturday, with up to three other trips on Tuesdays and Fridays and a single additional trip on Saturdays running as required. These trains typically had their origin or destination at one of the clay dries such as Burngullow or Goonbarrow, with booked motive power being an English, Welsh and Scottish Railway (EWS) Class 66. EWS has since been sold to DB Cargo.

== Plans to re-open passenger service ==
In 2014 a plan was proposed to reinstate passenger trains on the line, funding to upgrade the track and reinstate a station at Fowey would be required. The project had the support of Fowey mayor John Berryman and some councillors in Lostwithiel, Fowey, and Cornwall Council.

In 2020, the UK Government announced their £500 million Restoring Your Railway (RYR) Fund, with the aim of enabling the re-opening of existing lines and stations. By June 2022 there had been three rounds of funding, with proposals to re-open the Lostwithiel to Fowey line being submitted in Rounds 1 and 3. Neither of these proposals were selected for funding by the Department of Transport.
