= St Blazey engine shed =

Railway depot in Cornwall, England

St Blazey
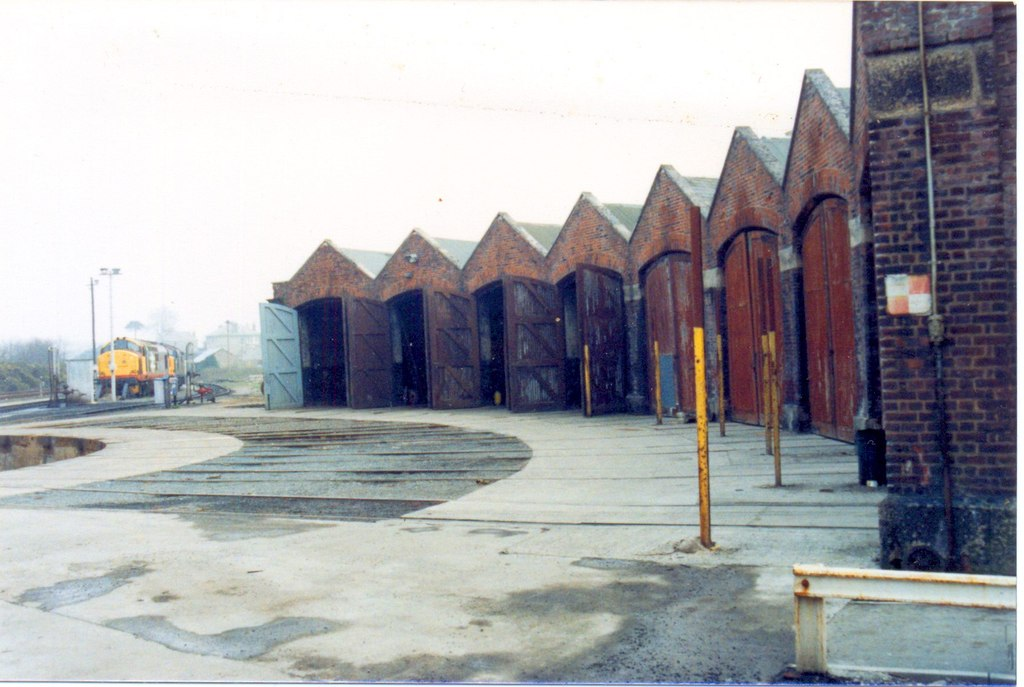
- St Blazey depot
- Interactive map of St Blazey

Location
- Location: Par, Cornwall
- Coordinates: 50.3521°N 4.7092°W

Characteristics
- Depot code: BZ

History
- Opened: 1874
- Closed: 6 July 2025
- Original: Cornwall Minerals Railway
- Pre-grouping: Great Western Railway
- Former depot code: SBZ, 83E, 84B

Listed Building – Grade II*
- Feature: Engine Sheds, Stack and Turntable, St Blazey Road
- Designated: 11 March 1974
- Reference no.: 1289905

St Blazey engine shed is located in Par, Cornwall, England, although it is named after the adjacent village of St Blazey. It was built in 1874 as the headquarters of the Cornwall Minerals Railway but for many years was a depot of the Great Western Railway and maintained about 30 locomotives. It closed as a railway depot in 2025 by which time it was operated by DB Cargo UK.

It was built as a roundhouse, an uncommon arrangement in England. It is a Grade II* listed building and its turntable remains in use for visiting heritage steam locomotives.

== History ==
St Blazey engine shed is part of the headquarters complex built for the Cornwall Minerals Railway (CMR). This line, which opened on 1 June 1874, linked Fowey and Newquay via St Blazey. The engineer, Sir Morton Peto, built an engine shed with workshops for the railway on the north edge of Par, close to the adjoining town of St Blazey. The buildings cost £16,000 to construct. The engine shed was initially known as 'Par' but on 1 January 1879 a line was built from the CMR at Par to the Par railway station on the Cornwall Railway after which the CMR engine shed and adjacent station were known as 'St Blazey' to avoid the confusion of two different locations with the same name.

The Cornwall Minerals Railway was operated by the Great Western Railway (GWR) from October 1877. The GWR made alterations to the sidings in 1907 including a new, elevated coaling stage and 45,000 imperial gallons (200,000 L) water tank. Gas lighting was installed in 1910 to replace the original oil lamps. The hand-worked 55-foot (17 m) turntable was replaced in the 1930s with one that was powered by vacuum. During World War II extension bars were provided for the turntable which allowed engines up to 61 ft 8 in (18.80 m) to be turned.

The Great Western Railway was nationalised into British Railways from 1 January 1948. Part of the engine shed was set aside in 1960 for servicing diesel locomotives. Diesels (based at Plymouth Laira) started to appear on china clay workings from St Blazey in March 1960 and the first diesel to be allocated to St Blazey arrived in November 1960. The last steam locomotive workings from the shed were on 28 April 1962. The track to the coaling stage was removed in 1967.

The engine shed, turntable and boiler house chimney were given listed building status in 1974 and are now designated as Grade II*.

The roundhouse was closed on 24 April 1987, partly because of repairs to the roof being needed. A new diesel serving area was created outside the wagon workshop and the redundant shed was leased out as industrial units from 1989 after repairs to the buildings. The operation of the depot at St Blazey transferred to English Welsh & Scottish Railway (now DB Cargo UK) when British Rail's freight services were privatised in 1995.

St Blazey depot was closed entirely on 6 July 2025 due to concerns about the condition of the roof of the wagon workshop. China clay wagon repair work was transferred to Westbury and DB Cargo's operations moved to Goonbarrow Junction, 2 1/4 miles (3.6 km) down the line towards Newquay.

The turntable was renovated in 2016 so that it can be used to turn heritage steam locomotives that visit Cornwall on special services. The first to be turned was on 7 August 2016. MPower Kernow, a community interest company, was set up in 2020 to develop the old railway depot at St Blazey to train people in science, technology, engineering and maths (STEM); construction and environmental technology skills.

== Description ==
The workshops at about the time of opening. The two storey section in the middle contained the railway company's offices and board room

The headquarters complex and rail yards were built on the west side of the railway, adjacent to the St Blazey Road. They occupy an area 660 yards (600 m) long and up to 100 yd (91 m) wide. The buildings are of brick sourced from Plymouth. They originally had slate roofs, the radial ridge-and-furrow roofs above the nine engine bays had long clerestories with louvered sides for ventilation but these have since been replaced by corrugated roofing without clerestoies.

The engine shed was built as a roundhouse in an arc around a 55 ft (17 m) turntable, the shed being 75 ft (23 m) deep and 202 ft (62 m) at its widest. The main shed had nine 70 ft (21 m) tracks leading from the turntable, each with a 58 ft (18 m) pit between the rails for servicing engines. The three centre tracks continued beyond the shed into a 122 ft × 80 ft (37 m × 24 m) workshop. The engine workshop formed the north end of a 40 ft (12 m)-wide wing containing a 101 ft (31 m) machine shop, 112 ft (34 m) blacksmith's shop with 8 forges, and signal engineers workshop. Above this wing was a short second storey which housed the railway company's offices. There was a 40 ft × 25 ft (12.2 m × 7.6 m) boiler house and 50 ft × 30 ft (15.2 m × 9.1 m) engine house to power machinery in the various workshops. A separate 200 ft × 50 ft (61 m × 15 m) building north of the roundhouse was a wagon workshop.

== Locomotives and routes ==
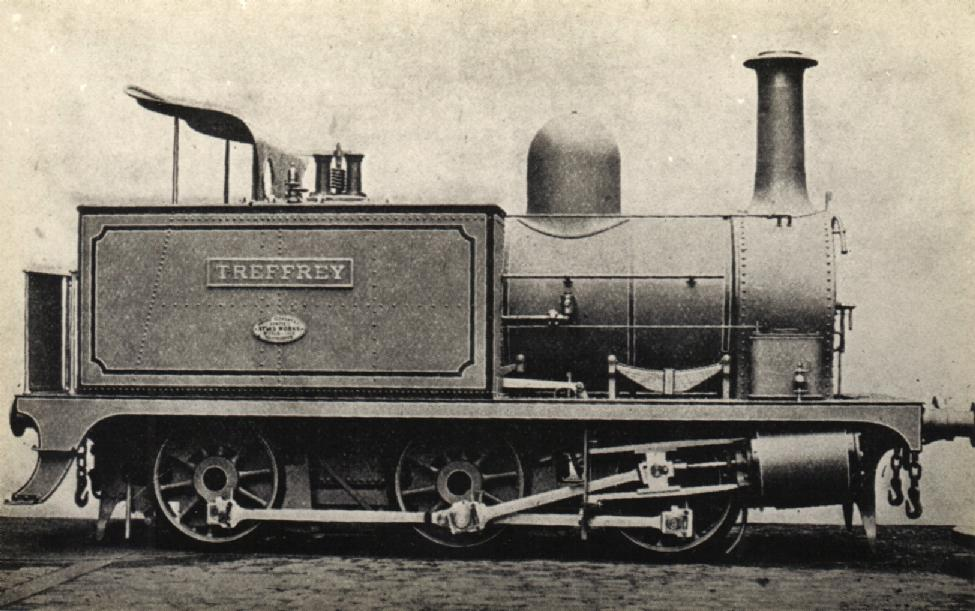
CMR Number 1 Treffrey as delivered to the depot in 1874

The Cornwall Minerals Railway bought 18 0-6-0T locomotives from Sharp, Stewart and Company. They were designed to work back-to-back in pairs and so would fill the nine tracks in the shed at St Blazey. The Great Western Railway sold nine of they locomotives but kept the other nine, renumbering them as 1392 to 1400. They were rebuilt into more conventional 0-6-0STs from 1883.

The maion line through Par was converted to standard gauge in 1892 which allowed St Blazey locomotives to work other routes in Cornwall (and other depot's locomotives to reach Newquay). The former Cornwall Minerals Railway 0-6-0-ST locomotives were retained for branch lines with tight curves; they were later replaced by GWR 1361 Class locomotives which were similar but with GWR fittings.

Larger 0-6-0 tank locomotives were used where possible such as 2021 Class and the common 5700Class. Heavier trains and branch passenger services were often worked by 2-2-2T locomotives such as the 4575 Classand 5101 Class. A small number of 4200 Class locomotives, large 2-8-0Ts, were used on trains to Fowey from 1928 as were larger 2-8-2Ts of the 7200 Class in the 1950s. A few tender locomotives were allocated for working on the main line. 2600 Class 'Aberdares' 2-6-0 in the 1920s, 4300 Class 2-6-0s in the 1930s, and 4900 Class 'Halls' in the 1940s and 1950s. Lightweight passenger trains, such as the autotrain on the Lostwithiel to Fowey branch were usually operated by four-coupled locomotives. The early 455s and 517s were replaced by more modern 1400s, number 1419 being the regular engine.

There was usually 30 or so locomotives allocated to St Blazey at any time.

Number of locomotives at St Blazey
Type	January 1920	January 1939	January 1948	January 1961
0-4-2T or 2-4-0T	2	2	0	2
0-6-0ST or 0-6-0PT	21	15	11	17
2-6-2T	6	13	15	7
2-8-0T	0	2	2	1
2-6-0	0	0	2	0
4-6-0	0	0	2	2
Total	29	32	32	29

A Class 37 3with a china clay train near Fowey in 1989

The only diesels allocated to St Blazey were shunting locomotives. The first was D3509 in February 1961 but there were six of these Class 08s by the end of the year. There were also a few Class 03s for a short time. There were three 08s allocated to St Blazey in 1981: one was used to shunt St Blazey yard, a second was used for trips to Wenfordbridge clay dries three days each week, while the third was a spare used to provide cover for the shunters at both St Blazey and Penzance sheds. This was a dual-braked example to work both the vacuum-braked 'clay hood' wagons used on china clay trains and the passenger stock that would be shunted at Penzance. In 1995 there were still three Class 08s, although by now all were fitted with air brakes.

Many different classes of mainline locomotives worked from St Blazey but were based at other depots for maintenance. The most common were Class 22 diesel-hydraulics from 1960 until 1971 when Class 25 diesel-electrics were used. These were replaced in 1978 by larger Class 37s which in turn were replaced by Class 66s from 1999.

St Blazey T&RS Depot nameplate

Several of the class 37s were given names relevant to the area:

- 37196 Tre, Pol and Pen (name later transferred to 37671)
- 37207 William Cookworthy (name later transferred to 37675)
- 37670 St Blazey T&RS Depot
- 37674 Saint Blaise Church 1445-1995

The mainline locomotives were mainly used for china clay trains that were loaded at various sidings in the area, most of which were unloaded at the docks in Fowey. Some bulk china clay trains worked tlong distances to industrial sites in places such as Kent, Stoke-on-Trent or even Scotland. One passenger train in the late 1970s was worked by locomotives from St Blazey, this being the summer Saturday service between Newquay and Newcastle; a pair of Class 25s taking it to Plymouth.

English, Welsh & Scottish Railway used St Blazey as their depot of postal trains working to Plymouth and Penzance which brought Class 67s to the depot. DMUs working the local branch lines also used St Blazey as a base, although two- and three-car DMUs could not enter the shed over the turntable. In later years these were Class 150s and Class 153s.

== Administration ==
St Blazey used to provide the locomotives for sub-sheds at Moorswater and Bodmin General. It was in the Newton Abbot Division until 1963 when a new Plymouth Division was created with its main depot at Laira.

The Great Western Railway introduced alphabetic codes to identify the allocation of locomotives in the early years of the twentieth century. Initially used only in documents, they were later painted onto the locomotives. St Blazey was given code SBZ but this was changed to SBLZ in 1939. For a short period in 1942 and 1943 it was S^{T}B with a small 'T' but this caused confusion with another depot which was STB so St Blazey reverted to SBZ. A different numeric code was used in later documents, St Blazey being depot 173. British Railways introduced its national shed codes in 1950 which resulted in the code painted on locomotives being replaced by a cast plate showing 83E. In 1963 it became depot 84B in the new Plymouth Division. This numeric system was replaced by two-letter codes when the TOPS computer system was introduced in May 1973 and this saw St Blazey becoming BZ.
