= Toldish Tunnel =

- Interactive map of Toldish Tunnel

Overview
- Other name: Toldish Tunnel
- Location: Cornwall, England
- Coordinates: East Portal: 50.4039°N 4.9223°W; West Portal: 50.4025°N 4.9285°W
- Status: Non active

Operation
- Opened: 1849
- Owner: Joseph Treffry
- Operator: Treffry Tramways
- Character: freight

Technical
- No. of tracks: single track
- Track gauge: 1,435 mm (4 ft 8 1/2 in) (narrow gauge)

Toldish Tunnel was built by Joseph Treffry as part of his mineral tramway from Newquay (Newquay to St. Dennis) which opened in 1849. This line was built to carry trams. In 1874 the line was taken over by the Cornwall Minerals Railway and the line from Newquay was extended to Par railway station. At this time the line from Newquay to Par was converted to standard gauge which was needed for the larger passenger carrying trains. It was not viable to widen the tunnel, so in 1874 it was bypassed and closed. The new line missing out the Toldish tunnel section was opened on 1 June 1874.

== Current condition ==
The arch at the western entrance of the Toldish tunnel has been partially bricked up and the cutting is now flooded. The tunnel is still shown as a disused railway and runs east-west from grid reference SW 924601 to SW 920599. The eastern entrance is overgrown but looks to be in good condition.

== See also ==
- Atlantic Coast Line, Cornwall
- West Cornwall Mineral Railways ISBN 978-1-904474-48-7 (February 2005) by Maurice Dart
