= St Blazey railway station =

Disused railway station in Cornwall, England

St Blazey Lanndreth
- St Blazey in the early 1900s

General information
- Location: St Blazey, Cornwall; England
- Coordinates: 50.3553°N 4.7102°W
- Grid reference: SX073541
- Platforms: 2

Other information
- Status: Closed

History
- Original company: Cornwall Minerals Railway
- Pre-grouping: Great Western Railway
- Post-grouping: Great Western Railway

Key dates
- 20 June 1876: Opened as Par (St Blazey)
- 1 January 1879: Renamed St Blazey
- 21 September 1925: Closed to public traffic
- 29 December 1934: Closed
Location

St Blazey railway station served St Blazey (Cornish: Lanndreth) and Par in Cornwall. It opened in 1876 as 'Par (St Blazey)' on the Cornwall Minerals Railway between Fowey and Newquay but was renamed 'St Blazey' in 1879 to avoid confusion with the Par railway station on the nearby Cornish Main Line.

It closed in 1934 but the signal box remains in use, controlling trains on the Atlantic Coast Line.

== History ==
The first rails at St Blazey were laid as part of Joseph Treffry's horse-powered tramway network in 1855 which linked industrial sites on the hills above St Blazey with his Par harbour. The tramways were later converted into a conventional railway by the Cornwall Minerals Railway; services started on 1 June 1874 between Newquay and Fowey. The company's headquarters and workshops were built at Par adjacent to the St Blazey Road.

The new railway did not gain as much freight as expected so added a passenger service from 20 June 1876. A station was built to the north of the workshops and was shown in the timetables as 'Par (St Blazey)'.

The Great Western Railway (GWR) took over operations on the Cornwall Minerals Railway from 1 October 1877. On 1 January 1879 a loop line was built to the Par railway station of the Cornwall Railway and the Cornwall Minerals Railway station renamed 'St Blazey' to avoid the confusion of two stations with the same name.

The GWR gradually increased the number of sidings at St Blazey, developing it as the centre for china clay and other traffic in the area. The first change was to lay some sidings south from the station into the space between the wagon workshops and St Blazey Road. This required the goods shed to be demolished. A goods loop was laid behind the northbound platform to enable goods trains to leave the yard without passing through the passenger platforms. In about 1907 some sidings were also laid northwards from near the wagon workshop almost as far as Middleway Road on the edge in St Blazey. These works cut off the station from the road and so a footbridge was built to allow passengers to access the northbound platform. The extra tracks needed a larger signal box which was built at the south end of the station in 1908. Further sidings were added later beside these to fill the all the space between the road and the goods loop.

St Blazey station closed to the public on 21 September 1925. The footbridge was dismantled and parts of it rebuilt at St Austell railway station where it replaced the level crossing of Trevarthian Road. St Blazey station continued to be used by a daily workmen's train to Fowey until 29 December 1934. The station buildings were eventually demolished in the 1970s but the signal box has been retained.

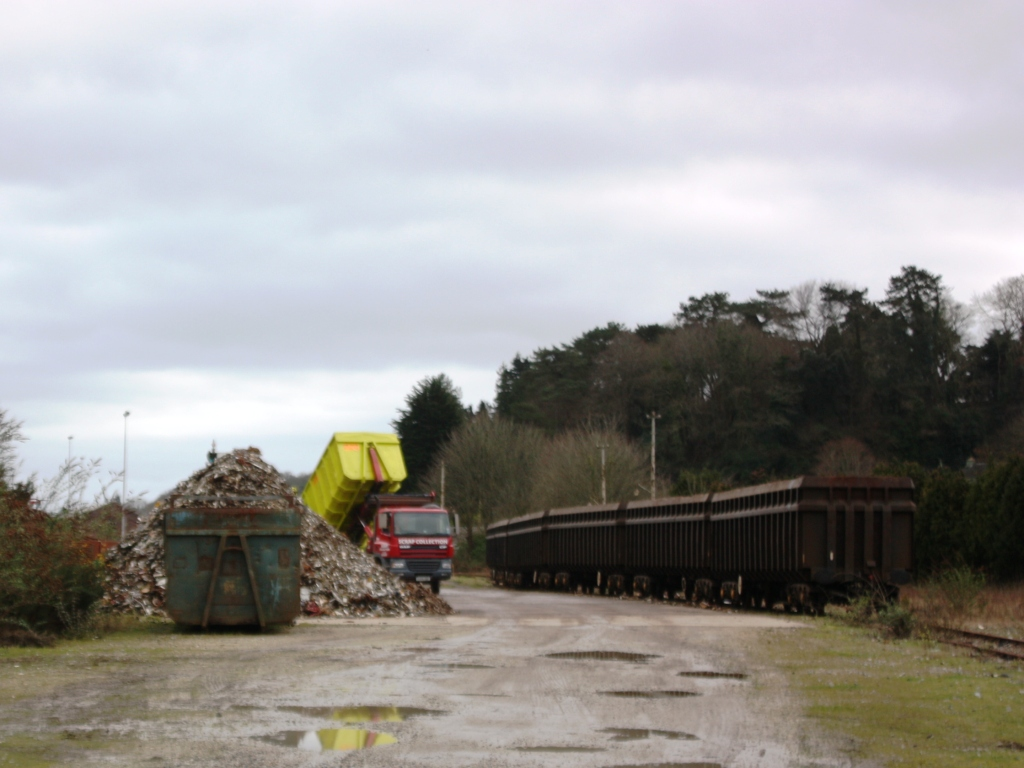
Loading scrap metal in the goods yard

Some 50 years after the last official passenger train called at St Blazey, passengers again used the station on 19 April 1984 when it was forced into use as the temporary terminus for trains from Newquay due to a derailment between St Blazey and Par.

General goods traffic ceased from 1 June 1964 but the depot and marshalling yard remained in use until 6 July 2025 when DB Cargo UK moved its Cornish base to Goonbarrow Junction. The sidings remain available for goods trains when needed.

== Description ==
St Blazey station shortly after it opened

St Blazey station is at milepost 282 1/4 (which is measured from London Paddington), 36 chains (720 m) from Par and 20 miles 27 chains (32.7 km; 20.34 mi) from Newquay.

The main building with ticket office and waiting room was built from brick but was later rendered. It was on the northbound platform, as is the surviving signal box. The southbound platform had a small waiting shelter. While there was a footbridge across the goods loop and sidings to reach the entrance on St Blazey Road, there was no footbridge between the two platforms. There was a goods shed on a siding to the south of the passenger platform but this was demolished and replaced by an open platform.

== Signalling ==
The signal box in 2009

The first signal box was on the east side of the line next to the junction between the Fowey main line and Par loop. It was replaced on 25 June 1908 by a new signal box at the south end of the northbound platform. This had 41 levers (in 1956 three were spare). Since 25 March 1973 it has controlled the level crossings at Middleway and St Blazey Bridge.

== Services ==
When the station opened in 1875 there were just two trains in each direction between Newquay and Fowey with a horse bus between St Blazey and the mainline station at Par. By 1888 there were three trains each day serving both the Newquay and Fowey routes, and by 1910 they had increased to four trains on the Newquay line and five on the Fowey line.

Preceding station	Historical railways	Following station
Luxulyan (Note: Luxulyan station was known as Bridges until 1905)	Great Western Railway	Fowey
Luxulyan	Great Western Railway	Par

== Passengers ==
Around 20,000 tickets could be sold at St Blazey over the course of a year:

Tickets by year
Year	Tickets sold
1903	15,972
1913	21,162
1923	21,910
