= Newquay and Cornwall Junction Railway =

Overview
- Headquarters: Par, Cornwall
- Locale: United Kingdom
- Dates of operation: 1869–1874
- Successor: Cornwall Minerals Railway

Technical
- Track gauge: 7 ft (2,134 mm)
- Length: 3.13 miles (5.04 km)

The Newquay and Cornwall Junction Railway was a 7 ft (2,134 mm) broad gauge railway intended to link the Cornwall Railway with the horse-worked Newquay Railway. It opened a short section to Nanpean in 1869, the remainder being built by the Cornwall Minerals Railway who took over the company in 1874. Its main traffic has always been china clay.

== Chronology ==
- 1864 Newquay and Cornwall Junction Railway Act 1864 (27 & 28 Vict. c. clxiii)
- 1869 Line opened
- 1874 Taken over by the Cornwall Minerals Railway
- 1892 Converted to standard gauge
- 1896 Amalgamated with Great Western Railway

== History ==
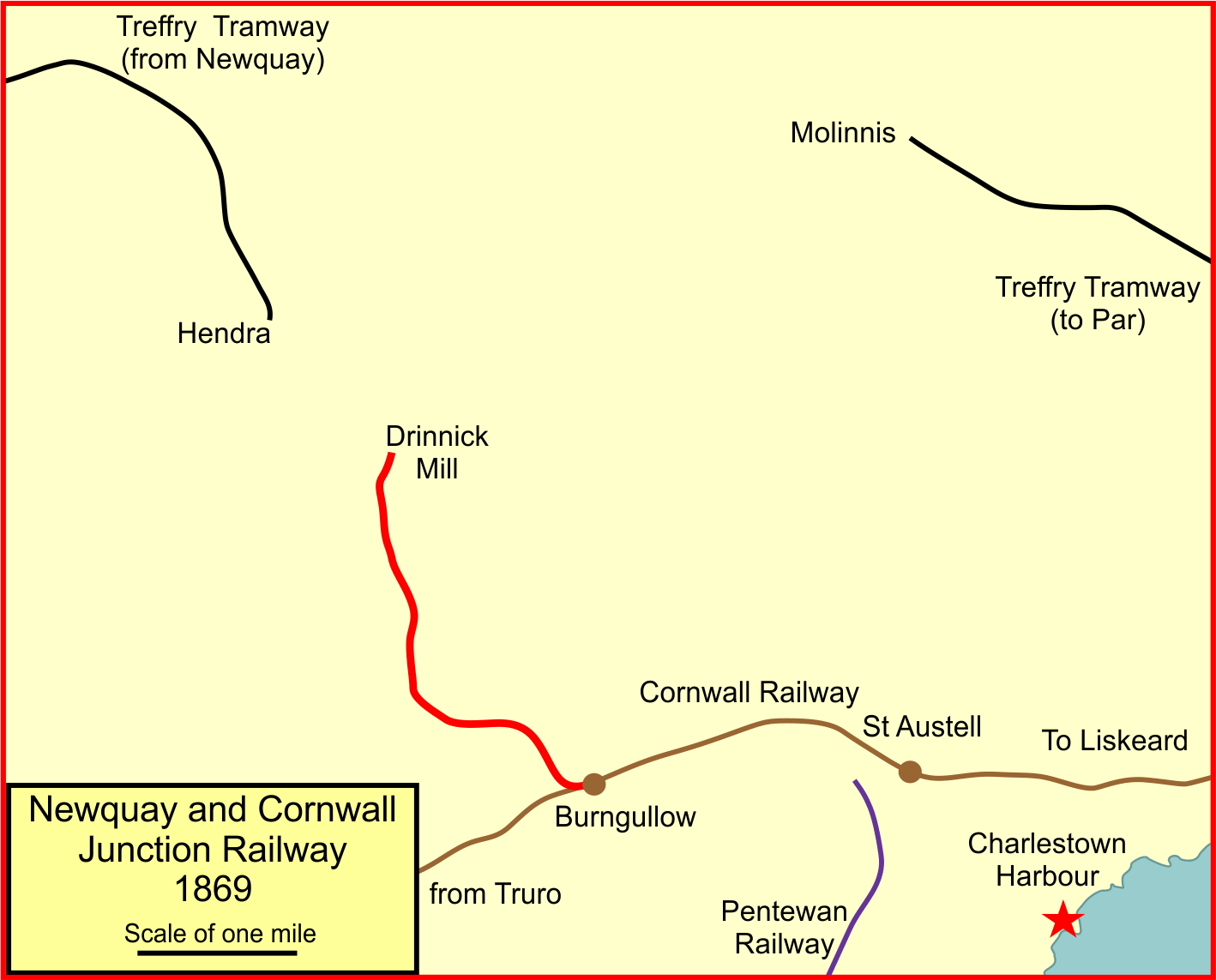
Map of Newquay and Cornwall Junction Railway at opening

Joseph Treffry had opened a tramway to connect mines and pits in the Hendra and St Dennis area of Cornwall in 1849. His tramway was horse-operated and led to Pontsmill, where transshipment was necessary to the Par Canal, also built by Treffry, for onward conveyance to Par Harbour. The practical limitations of his line were insignificant at first, but as time passed were seen to inhibit trade.

The Cornwall Railway opened in 1859, providing a broadly west-to-east line giving easier access to markets for the extracted minerals, but although the lines crossed at Par, there was at first no connection; moreover the Cornwall Railway was built on the broad gauge and Treffry's line on the standard gauge, then usually referred to as "narrow gauge". The Cornwall Railway opened a station at Burngullow in 1863 and this was used as a railhead for some china clay production, which was carted to the station.

Newquay and Cornwall Junction Railway Act 1864
- Act of Parliament
- Parliament of the United Kingdom
- Long title: An Act for making a Railway from the Cornwall Railway near Burngullow, to the Saint Dennis Branch of the Newquay Railway, near Hendra, in the County of Cornwall; and for other Purposes.
- Citation: 27 & 28 Vict. c. clxiii

Dates
- Royal assent: 14 July 1864

Text of statute as originally enacted

On 14 July 1864 the Newquay and Cornwall Junction Railway was authorised by an act of Parliament, the Newquay and Cornwall Junction Railway Act 1864 (27 & 28 Vict. c. clxiii), to build a 5¼ mile line from Burngullow to connect with the St Dennis branch of Treffry's Newquay line. Burngullow is located about 2 miles (3 km) west of St Austell station, on the Cornwall Railway main line. The authorised capital was £36,000. (Note: Date of act according to Carter was 4 July 1864; Vaughan says 14 July 1864. Vaughan quotes the capital as £27,000; probably borrowing powers of £9,000, the usual one-third proportion, was authorised, making the £36,000 total.)

The company was authorised to make agreements with the Treffry Estate Trustees to convert the Newquay tramway line to broad gauge and take it over, connecting Newquay to the Cornwall Railway. The company would reach Hendra, "affording direct communication with Newquay, Par, Fowey and Falmouth". Access over the Treffry lines would involve a break of gauge.

Newquay and Cornwall Junction Railway Act 1868
- Act of Parliament
- Parliament of the United Kingdom
- Long title: An Act for authorizing a Deviation of the Newquay and Cornwall Junction Railway, and for extending the Time for the Completion of that Railway; and for conferring further Powers on the Newquay and Cornwall Junction Railway Company, and on Treffry's Trustees, with reference to the Newquay Railway; and for other Purposes.
- Citation: 31 & 32 Vict. c. vi

Dates
- Royal assent: 29 May 1868

Text of statute as originally enacted

In fact difficulties in raising the required funds prevailed for some time; in addition the route was required to be alter; an authorising act of Parliament, the Newquay and Cornwall Junction Railway Act 1868 (31 & 32 Vict. c. vi), was obtained for an 82 chain (1.65 km) deviation, as well as permitting more capital.

At last the short main line (3.5 miles (5.6 km) in length) was opened from Burngullow to Drinnick Mill Clay Works, near Nanpean on 1 July 1869. The company had exhausted its funds and abandoned plans to extend further. The offices for the company were at Par and shared with the Lostwithiel and Fowey Railway.

In 1872 it was agreed to lease the line to the newly formed Cornwall Minerals Railway which would complete the connection to the Newquay Railway. It would also convert both this and the Par Tramway for steam engines, and connect these together and with quays at Fowey. The lease took effect from 1 June 1874 but the company never received everything that it had been promised and took legal action against the Cornwall Minerals Railway. The Newquay and Cornwall Junction Railway directors stopped meeting in 1885.

The Great Western Railway took over the operation of the Cornwall Minerals Railway from 1 October 1877 and was amalgamated with this company on 1 July 1896. In the meantime, the line had been converted to 4 ft 8 1/2 in (1,435 mm) standard gauge along with all the other lines west of Exeter over the weekend of 21 May 1892, finally enabling through trains from Burngullow to St Dennis Junction.

The railway has only ever carried goods traffic. The line no longer extends to St Dennis, but the original line still carries china clay from Parkandillack to Fowey.

== Locomotives ==
The contractor who built the line, William West of St Blazey, also contracted to operate the railway. The Cornwall Minerals Railway operated the same or similar locomotives, but these were withdrawn when the Great Western Railway took over operation. An engine shed was provided at Burngullow. It is unclear how many locomotives were operated but two have been positively identified.

- Newquay, an 0-4-2ST which had previously worked the South Wales Mineral Railway.
- Phoenix, a tank engine which may have come from Roland Brotherhood, an engineer at Chippenham.

Present day trains are usually powered by EWS Class 66 locomotives.
