= Cornwall Minerals Railway =

Railway in Cornwall

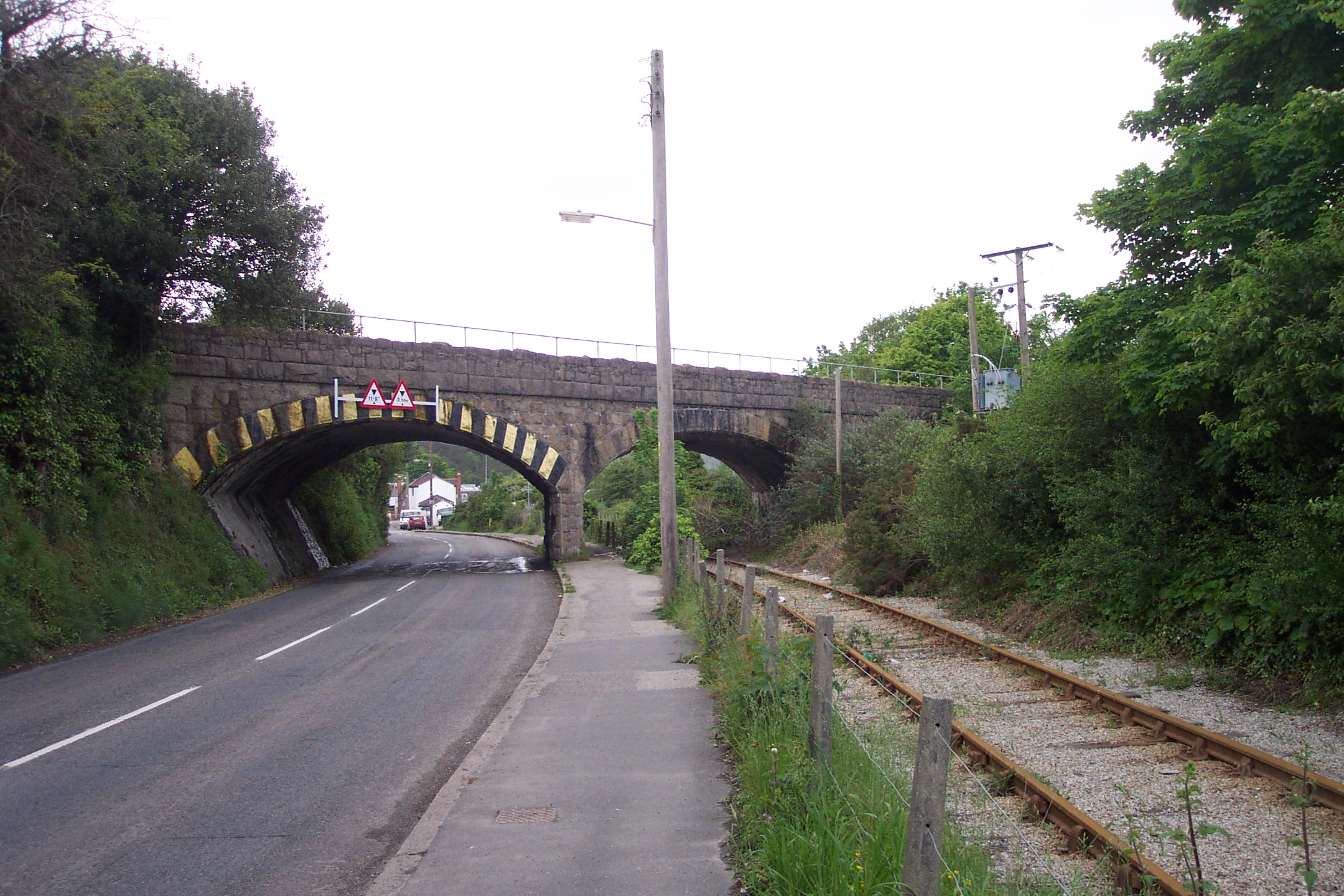
The line of the former Cornwall Minerals Railway passing under Par Viaduct and the Cornish Main Line, near the entrance to Par Harbour.

The Cornwall Minerals Railway (CMR) owned and operated a network of 45 miles (72 km) of standard gauge railway lines in central Cornwall, England, United Kingdom. It started by taking over an obsolescent horse-operated tramway in 1862, and it improved and extended it, connecting Newquay and Par Harbours, and Fowey. Having expended considerable capital, it was hurt by a collapse in mineral extraction due to a slump in prices. Despite its title, it operated a passenger service between Newquay and Fowey.

After a period in bankruptcy it returned to normal financial arrangements and acquired the moribund Lostwithiel and Fowey line.

In 1896 it sold its line to the Great Western Railway. Its main passenger line from Par to Newquay is still in use as the Atlantic Coast Line, and also carries some mineral traffic, but the Par to Fowey line has been converted to a private road.

== Background ==
=== Joseph Treffry's tramways ===
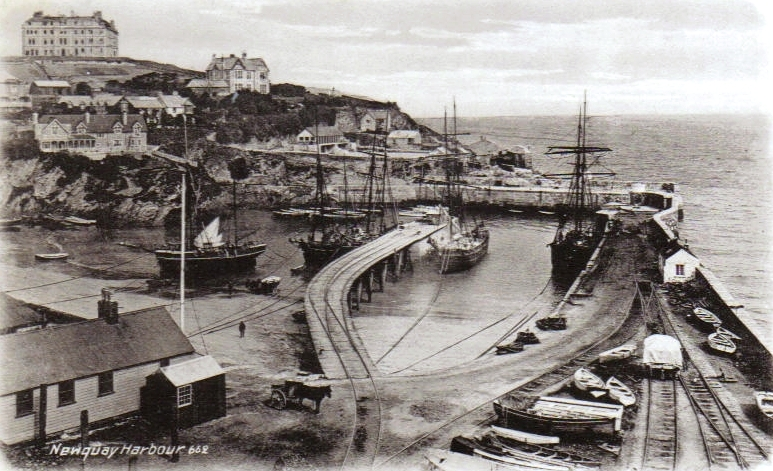
Newquay Harbour in 1904

Joseph Austen (1782 - 1850) of Fowey inherited considerable lands and mineral resources in central Cornwall. By 1838 he changed his name to Joseph Treffry, and he is better known by that name. The expense of transport of minerals to market was heavy, and Treffry set about improving the means of transport. He built Par Docks, and the Par Canal connecting them to Pontsmill, together with tramways on inclined planes that brought the important copper mine Fowey Consols and Par Consols into the network. China clay was extracted in the Hensbarrow area north-west of Luxulyan and the mineral was also brought to Pontsmill.

Treffry soon expanded his interests by building a horse-operated tramway up the Luxulyan Valley to Molinnis, near the present-day Bugle; this line opened in 1844. Later he built another tramway from Newquay to Hendra, and from Newquay to East Wheal Rose mine; he also developed Newquay Harbour: these lines opened in 1849, and collectively are conventionally known as the Treffry Tramways. Both were on the standard gauge. Treffry had made it clear that he wanted to connect these lines, forming a through route between Par and Newquay; in particular this would have enabled copper and tin ores to be exported from the north coast of Cornwall to South Wales, and coal to be imported that way, avoiding the difficult shipping route round Land's End. However Treffry suffered from ill health in the late 1840s and he never saw his dream brought into effect: he died in 1850. Nonetheless his initiative vastly enhanced transport and reduced costs, but he chose horse operation on the basis of lower costs of operation, and this led to its soon becoming obsolescent.

=== Other railways in the area ===
A railway connecting Cornwall with London and the industrial Midlands and North of England had long been desired, but the difficult topography made raising the necessary finance difficult. After a long struggle, the Cornwall Railway opened in 1859, connecting Truro and Plymouth, and by association with the Great Western Railway (GWR) and its allies, it formed a broad gauge route from Truro to London and Gloucester; there was a connecting line from Penzance, and the Cornwall Railway later extended to Falmouth.

In 1864 another line was promoted, the Newquay and Cornwall Junction Railway (N&CJR), to join the St Dennis terminal of Treffry's lines to Burngullow on the newly opened Cornwall Railway. The N&CJR built its line on the broad gauge to connect with the Cornwall Railway but Treffry's lines were standard gauge. The N&CJR had ambitious plans to extend and possibly take over and convert the Treffry lines, but in fact it ran out of money before completing its own line. It was built only from Burngullow to Nanpean and opened in 1869.

Another short line opened in 1869 at the same time as the N&CJR, this was the Lostwithiel and Fowey Railway. Its broad gauge line ran from a junction with the Cornwall Railway at Lostwithiel to jetties near Fowey. Fowey was then an important harbour and the railway's purpose was simply forming a connection for minerals and goods to the Cornwall Railway system.

== The tramways converted to a railway ==
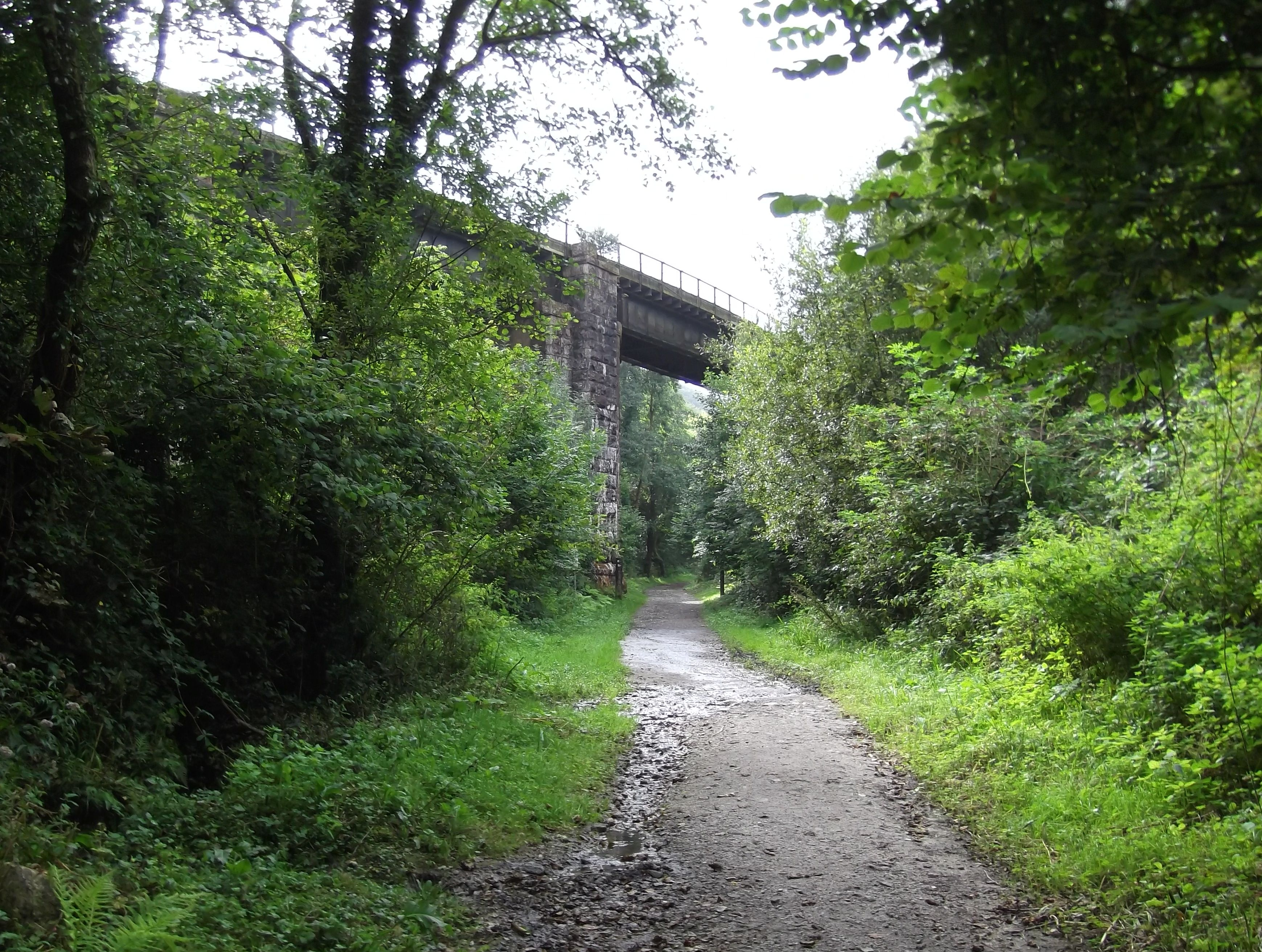
The 1874 CMR line crossing the 1867 Rock Mill Quarry line at Pontsmill

William Richardson Roebuck became interested in the development of mineral extraction, and railway transport, in central Cornwall. As well as acquiring an interest (Note: Through the 'Cornish Consolidated Iron Mines Corporation'.) in iron mines, he negotiated with Treffry's trustees to lease the tramways. A 60-year lease was concluded on 21 February 1872. As part of the agreement, Roebuck undertook that if he was successful in acquiring the N&CJR line he would lay broad gauge rails on the former Treffry line from the point where the two lines met as far as Newquay, and improve the route for locomotive-operated passenger trains from Burngullow to Newquay; and similarly if he acquired the Lostwithiel and Fowey Railway he would extend that to Fowey Harbour, as its southern extremity was at deep water jetties at Carne Point, some distance north of Fowey itself.

The lease of the tramways was only a first step, and Roebuck's proposed improvements were ambitious, involving new lines, and locomotive operation. The ailing N&CJR came into his plans, and he formed a limited company, the 'Cornwall Minerals Railway and Harbour Company Limited' for the purpose of incorporating all his proposed works and obtaining Board of Trade authorisation under the Railways Construction Facilities Act 1864 (27 & 28 Vict. c. 121). However this was unsuccessful, and Roebuck and his company were obliged to obtain an act of Parliament in the ordinary way.

Cornwall Minerals Railway Act 1873 (Note: Section 1.)
- Act of Parliament
- Parliament of the United Kingdom
- Long title: An Act to authorise the construction of Railways in the county of Cornwall, to be called the Cornwall Mineral Railways, and the amalgamation therewith of the New Quay and Cornwall Junction Railway, and other undertakings connected therewith.
- Citation: 36 & 37 Vict. c. clxii
- Territorial extent: United Kingdom

Dates
- Royal assent: 21 July 1873
- Commencement: 21 July 1873 (Note: The Acts of Parliament (Commencement) Act 1793.)

Status: Current legislation

Text of statute as originally enacted

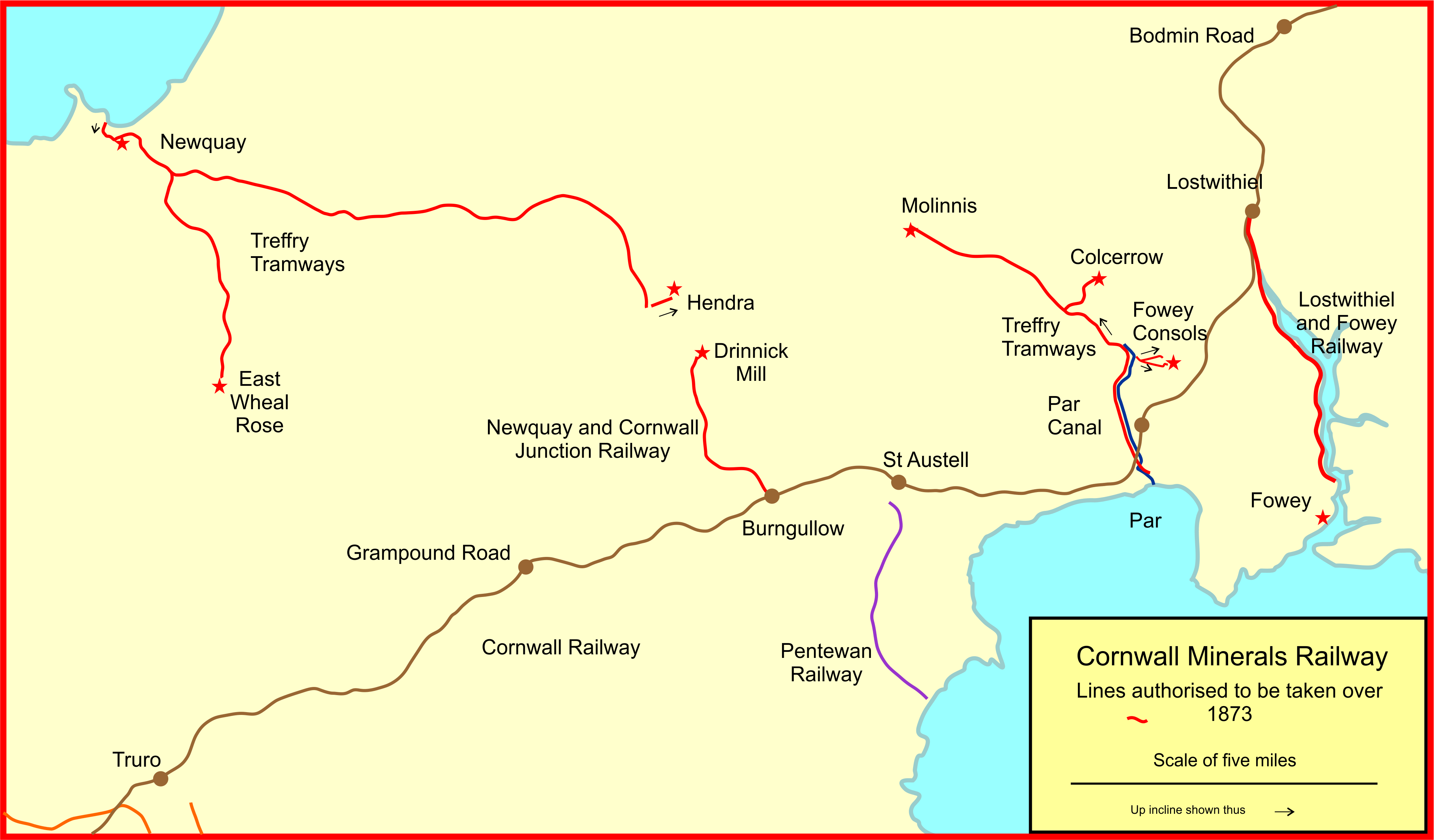
Map of the railways adopted by the Cornwall Minerals Railway in 1873

The 'Cornwall Minerals Railway' (now omitting the reference to a harbour) obtained authorisation by the Cornwall Minerals Railway Act 1873 (36 & 37 Vict. c. clxii) to acquire and improve the Treffry Tramways, and to build new railways to connect St Dennis (then called 'Bodmin Road Junction') and Molinnis; and to acquire the Newquay and Cornwall Junction Railway and to build a line between its northern end at Nanpean (Drinnick Mill) and Hendra. Moreover, a new line connecting St Blazey (near Par) and Fowey Harbour was to be built, with jetties and wharves there, and improvements to the quays at Newquay. There were also to be three short extensions elsewhere, to Carbis, to Melangoose Mill and to Treamble.

This was a massive project; the improvements to Treffry's line involved a new alignment 2 1/2 m (4 km) long in the Luxulyan Valley, which was difficult terrain for railways: the Carmears incline was to be by-passed. Toldish Tunnel and the Treffry and Trenance Viaducts were unsuitable and they too needed to be by-passed; and numerous level crossings of roads needed to be replaced by bridges. The line to Fowey involved a new tunnel at Pinnock, 1,173 yards (1,073 m) in length, and by far the longest tunnel in Cornwall.

The conversion to locomotive operation required the acquisition not merely of the locomotives, but also of new rolling stock, and the provision of goods station accommodation and maintenance facilities, and of a proper signalling system. The CMR built a half-roundhouse at St Blazey (then called Par) to house the large fleet of 18 locomotives; they were intended to be used in pairs, bunker to bunker, and the roundhouse was designed to accommodate them in pairs.

The Newquay and Cornwall Junction Railway was authorised to be transferred to the CMR by the Cornwall Minerals Railway Act 1873, and the CMR worked that line from June 1874, although the actual formal transfer did not take place until 1884.

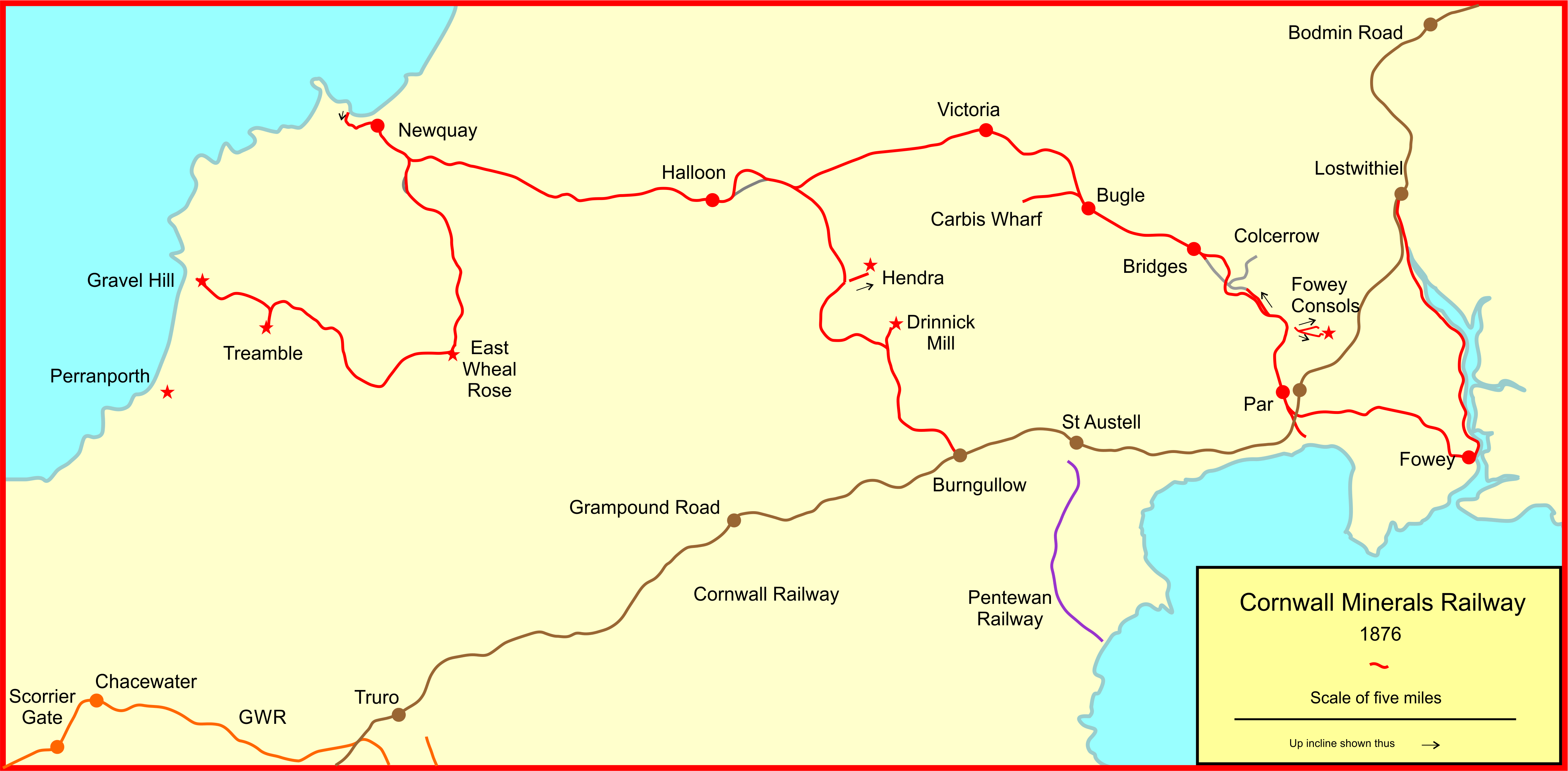
Map of the Cornwall Minerals Railway in 1876

The CMR pressed ahead rapidly with the construction and conversion works, applying considerable resources on the ground. An inspector from the Board of Trade examined the line on 15 May 1874, but did not grant the necessary permission due to a number of detail shortcomings. However, full opening took place on 1 June 1874, only 11 months after authorisation.

=== Branches ===
Fal Valley Railway Act 1874
- Act of Parliament
- Parliament of the United Kingdom
- Long title: An Act to authorise the construction in Cornwall of Railways to be called The Fal Valley Railway; and for other purposes.
- Citation: 37 & 38 Vict. c. clxxix
- Territorial extent: United Kingdom

Dates
- Royal assent: 30 July 1874
- Commencement: 30 July 1874

Status: Current legislation

Text of statute as originally enacted

Temple Mineral Railway Act 1874
- Act of Parliament
- Parliament of the United Kingdom
- Long title: An Act for incorporating the Temple Mineral Railway Company, and authorising them to make and maintain the Temple Mineral Railway; and for authorising arrangements between them and other Railway Companies; and for other purposes.
- Citation: 37 & 38 Vict. c. clxxxix
- Territorial extent: United Kingdom

Dates
- Royal assent: 7 August 1874
- Commencement: 7 August 1874
- Repealed: 28 June 1877
Other legislation
Repealed by	Temple Mineral Railway (Abandonment) Act 1877

Status: Repealed

Text of statute as originally enacted

Cornwall Minerals Railway Act 1875
- Act of Parliament
- Parliament of the United Kingdom
- Long title: An Act for conferring on the Cornwall Minerals Railway Company further powers with respect to the Fal Valley and Temple Mineral Railway Companies; and for other purposes.
- Citation: 38 & 39 Vict. c. cxxix
- Territorial extent: United Kingdom

Dates
- Royal assent: 19 July 1875
- Commencement: 19 July 1875

Status: Current legislation

Text of statute as originally enacted

Fal Valley Railway (Transfer and Abandonment) Act 1877
- Act of Parliament
- Parliament of the United Kingdom
- Long title: An Act for vesting in the Cornwall Minerals Railway Company the powers conferred by "The Fal Valley Railway Act, 1874," with respect to a portion of the Fal Valley Railway, and for the abandonment of the remainder of that Railway; and for other purposes.
- Citation: 40 & 41 Vict. c. liv

Dates
- Royal assent: 28 June 1877

Text of statute as originally enacted

Temple Mineral Railway (Abandonment) Act 1877
- Act of Parliament
- Parliament of the United Kingdom
- Long title: An Act for the abandonment of the Railway authorised by "The Temple Mineral Railway Act, 1874;" and for other purposes.
- Citation: 40 & 41 Vict. c. lv
- Territorial extent: United Kingdom

Dates
- Royal assent: 28 June 1877
- Commencement: 28 June 1877
- Repealed: 31 January 2013
Other legislation
Repeals/revokes	Temple Mineral Railway Act 1874
Repealed by	Statute Law (Repeals) Act 2013

Status: Repealed

Text of statute as originally enacted

Although the Treffry Viaduct had been by-passed by the main line, it was still used to access the Colcerrow Quarries: these were now served from the Luxulyan end, crossing the viaduct and reversing at its south end. Carmears incline was now out of use. However, in 1874 T. Medland Stocker of the West of England China Clay and Stone Company was persuaded that the water that had been brought to the Carmears water wheel, now disused, was a source of power that could be put to use; by 1875 a stone mill plant had been made operational at Pontsmill, using power generated by water turbines. The stone was brought to the site via Nanpean and St Dennis Junction, and the works were gradually expanded, becoming the largest complex of stone mills in Great Britain in the twentieth century. The branch to quarries at Cairns, diverging from the Colcerrow branch, ceased operation about 1880.

The Treamble branch was extended to Gravel Hill where there were iron ore deposits; this was an addition to the originally authorised network, and was done by arrangement with the landowner and without parliamentary authority.

The Cornwall Minerals Railway Act 1873 (36 & 37 Vict. c. clxii) had required the CMR to lay the Drinnick Mill to St Dennis section in mixed gauge, giving the Cornwall Railway broad gauge access to St Dennis; this obligation had been incorporated into the Newquay and Cornwall Junction Railway Act 1864 (27 & 28 Vict. c. clxiii). The CMR only laid narrow gauge (i.e. standard gauge) rails at first, seeing no advantage in adding the broad gauge rails. In fact the Cornwall Railway petitioned in the Court of Chancery for the broad gauge rails to be added, and this was done in the following year (June 1875), although they were arranged so as to be unusable.

== Economic reality ==
Mineral extraction in Cornwall was always susceptible to world price fluctuations and at the time of opening of the CMR lines, cheap iron ore production in Spain and elsewhere developed and made the Cornish mines uneconomic; numerous iron ore mines closed suddenly. Contracts had been agreed with certain mines guaranteeing volumes of carrying, which they were now unable to satisfy; the CMR sued the Cornish Consolidated Mines Corporation, but this simply resulted in the Cornish Consolidated Mines Corporation going into liquidation.

In addition china clay production was significantly reduced by agreement between the pit owners, following price depression due to over-production. These factors led to a desperate situation for the CMR which had made considerable financial outlays and was now unable to obtain income, and some major shareholders were severely embarrassed.

Seeing the income from mineral traffic so deficient, the company started a passenger service between Fowey and Newquay, using six second-hand coaches probably obtained from the Midland Railway. This started on 20 July 1876; two trains ran each way, taking 95 minutes for the 26-mile (42 km) journey.

== Lease to the Great Western Railway ==
The CMR's financial situation became increasingly difficult, and the only way out seemed to be a lease to the Great Western Railway (GWR). (The 'Associated Companies', consisting of the original GWR, the Bristol and Exeter Railway and the South Devon Railway which had amalgamated in February 1876, forming a large and powerful railway company, also using the name Great Western Railway. The GWR was also lessee of the Cornwall Railway.)

Cornwall Minerals Railway Act 1877
- Act of Parliament
- Parliament of the United Kingdom
- Long title: An Act for conferring further powers on the Cornwall Mineral Railway Company in relation to their undertaking, and for authorising arrangements between them and the Great Western Railway Company; and for other purposes.
- Citation: 40 & 41 Vict. c. ccxxiii

Dates
- Royal assent: 10 August 1877

Text of statute as originally enacted

Lease of the CMR to the GWR was agreed on 30 April 1877, and was authorised by act of Parliament, the Cornwall Minerals Railway Act 1877 (40 & 41 Vict. c. ccxxiii), on 10 August 1877; it took formal effect on 1 October 1877 and was for a term of 999 years. The GWR was to receive 53.11% of gross receipts.

At that time there was no connection between the GWR (ex Cornwall Railway) line and the CMR at Par, but the lease encouraged the GWR to make a connection; a double track narrow gauge line was built from Par (CMR station) to the GWR station; this opened on 1 January 1879; the CMR Par station was renamed St Blazey. There was of course a break of gauge at Par GWR.

From 1877, the CMR was a financial vehicle only, all the day-to-day operation of the railway now being in the hands of the GWR. The company had evidently (Note: Vaughan does not mention the event of becoming insolvent, but refers to 'release' from it on page 23.) become formally insolvent, and this must have involved the appointment of an administrator. In the following years, the very depressed state of mineral trade in Cornwall revived somewhat, and with it the traffic on the CMR network, and the lease charge received from the GWR. In March 1885 the CMR made a scheme of arrangement with creditors, releasing it from administration, by means of a financial reconstruction. (Note: Creditors had debts owing to them, but they appeared unlikely to be paid in full; they exchanged them for new shares and debt at lower levels, based on an optimistic view of the future performance of the Company.)

Cornwall Minerals Railway Act 1890
- Act of Parliament
- Parliament of the United Kingdom
- Long title: An Act to enable the Cornwall Minerals Railway Company to make a new Railway and for other purposes.
- Citation: 53 & 54 Vict. c. xl
- Territorial extent: United Kingdom

Dates
- Royal assent: 9 June 1890
- Commencement: 9 June 1890

Status: Current legislation

Cornwall Minerals Railway Act 1894
- Act of Parliament
- Parliament of the United Kingdom
- Long title: An Act to confer further powers on the Cornwall Minerals Railway Company.
- Citation: 57 & 58 Vict. c. lxxx
- Territorial extent: United Kingdom

Dates
- Royal assent: 20 July 1894
- Commencement: 20 July 1894

Status: Current legislation

Text of statute as originally enacted

Finding itself out of administration, and with income steadily rising as the mineral traffic revived, and the original network being operated by the GWR, the CMR considered adding to its network to better serve mineral traffic. A short spur to Wheal Virgin was opened, probably in 1893; it was known as the Wheal Rose Branch (not to be confused with East Wheal Rose, south of Newquay). On 2 October 1893 a more ambitious new line from Goonbarrow Junction (then referred to as Roskear Sidings) opened to Carbean; this section was 3 1/2 miles (5.6 km) in length. A shorter branch, half a mile (about 1 km) in length was opened on the same day from Bugle to Martins Goonbarrow and Great Beam. The CMR worked the longer Carbean branch itself with a locomotive specially acquired for the purpose.

The Lostwithiel and Fowey Railway (L&FR) had opened as a broad gauge line connecting jetties at Carne Point, a short distance north of Fowey itself, in 1869. Intended for mineral traffic to the harbour, it was never successful in attracting traffic away from other routes, and it suffered commercially when the CMR line to Fowey opened in 1874. Traffic was suspended at the beginning of 1880. The CMR became interested in it as its jetties were usable, and it purchased the line from the insolvent owners; the transfer was authorised by the Lostwithiel and Fowey Railway Act 1892 (55 & 56 Vict. c. clxxxii) on 27 June 1892. The CMR rebuilt the line, reconstructing several bridges and altering the track gauge to standard gauge: the main line at Lostwithiel had been converted by the GWR in May 1892. The jetties at Carne Point were improved, and a connecting line was made between the CMR Fowey station and yard, and the former L&FR Carne Point terminal. The line reopened on 16 September 1895, and carried both goods and passenger traffic.

The short Gravel Hill extension from Treamble had been built solely to serve an iron mine there, and almost as soon as it opened the collapse in iron ore prices led to closure of the mine. Left without any traffic, the line was lifted in 1888.

Treffry's water wheel at Carmears was put back into use in the 1890s to mill stone. This became known as the Wheelpit Mill and the resulting material was piped down to Pontsmill in slurry form in a pipeline laid on the course of the former tramway incline. The raw material was brought to the site along the original Treffry line over the viaduct. This horse-drawn operation continued until about 1918, the primitive operating method having been a significant disadvantage. The Colcerrow Quarry operation, also using the viaduct, continued until about 1930.

== Take over by the Great Western Railway ==
Cornwall Minerals Railway Act 1896
- Act of Parliament
- Parliament of the United Kingdom
- Long title: An Act to transfer the undertaking of the Cornwall Minerals Railway Company to the Great Western Railway Company and to empower the Great Western Railway Company to raise additional Capital.
- Citation: 59 & 60 Vict. c. cxcviii

Dates
- Royal assent: 7 August 1896

Text of statute as originally enacted

The Cornwall Minerals Railway network was leased to the GWR, and was being operated by that company, and discussions started regarding a transfer of ownership. This resulted in a purchase by the GWR, made effective by the Cornwall Minerals Railway Act 1896 (59 & 60 Vict. c. cxcviii) on 1 July 1896. The entire network was now part of the larger company, and the CMR company was dissolved.

The CMR had taken over Treffry's line from Newquay to East Wheal Rose, and extended it to Treamble. In the last years of the nineteenth century the GWR wished to build a line linking Truro and Newquay, and it obtained the Great Western Railway (Truro and Newquay Railway) Act 1897 (60 & 61 Vict. c. xii) as authority to do so; the line was called the Truro and Newquay Railway. Leaving the Truro to Penzance line at Chacewater, it joined the Treamble line at Shepherds, and much of the earlier Treffry route was used for the new line. A sharp curve near Trevemper was eliminated by a new alignment over a short distance—the 'Trevemper deviation'. The new line opened in two stages, the northern section completing the through route, opening on 2 January 1905.

Newquay railway station was substantially enlarged and modernised to accommodate the additional traffic. It was ready for the opening of the new line from Truro, and from May 1906 through carriages were worked to Newquay from London via Luxulyan. This was to encourage the development of the seaside holiday trade, which increased considerably in the following decades. In turn this required improvements to the main line from Par: in 1921 the line was doubled between St Dennis Junction to Tregoss Moor. Goonbarrow to Bugle was doubled in 1930.

=== In the twentieth century ===
Whereas in the 19th century, numerous branches and sidings had been built in Central Cornwall to reach china clay deposits, by the 20th century, it had become normal practice to bring china clay to the railway in slurry form in pipelines, and numerous clay dries were constructed adjacent to existing lines. A clay dry known as Central Cornwall Dry was built in the Luxulyan Valley floor north west of Pontsmill, in 1920. It was located on the west bank of the river at a point where the original Treffry line had been on the east side. A short branch extension was built and the stub of the old line renovated to serve the location; a petrol locomotive was used to trip from Pontsmill itself. The dry was later taken over by English Clay Lovering Pochin, but it was closed in 1960.

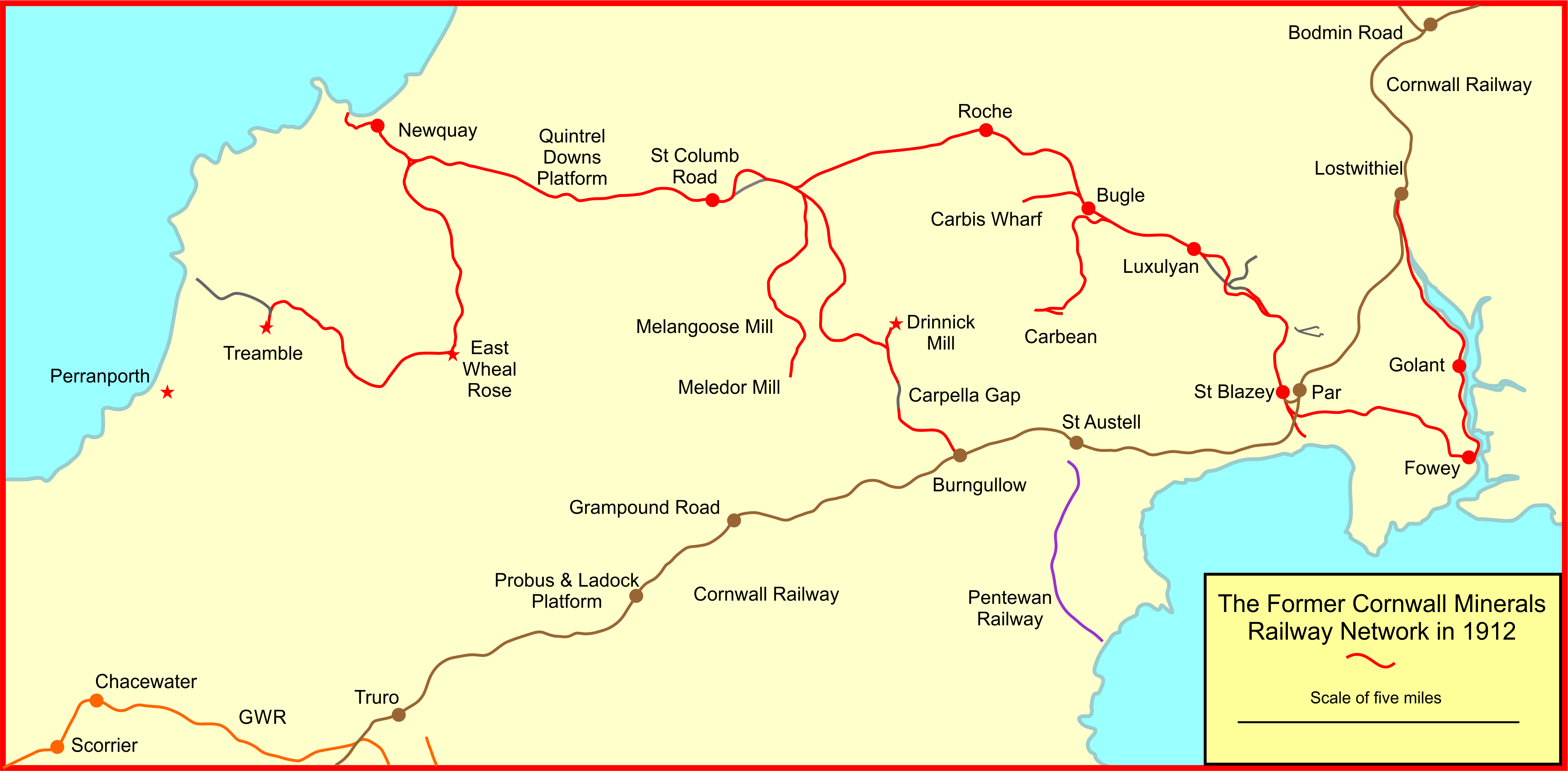
Map of the former Cornwall Minerals Railway network in 1912

When the Newquay and Cornwall Junction Railway had been authorised, the Carpella Mining Company retained rights to extract minerals—in this case, china clay—in the ground, and in 1909 that company exercised its right. Notwithstanding the objections of the GWR, the mining company's rights prevailed, and the line was severed, creating the so-called Carpella Gap. For the time being the connecting sidings on the line were worked from the respective ends, until in 1930 the GWR constructed a deviation, reconnecting the through line and by-passing the mineral workings.

The Retew branch was extended from Melangoose Mill to Meledor Mill in 1912 in connection with china clay workings.

The Treamble branch was closed in 1917, later being relaid and reopened in 1926.

The Rock Mill Quarry tramway had fallen into disuse at the turn of the century, but in the 1920s the Central Cornwall Dry was built in the valley floor west of Pontsmill, fed from a speculative quarry at Starrick Moor. The earlier tramway from Pontsmill was revived, but crossed to the south side of the river to reach the kiln. A petrol locomotive made trips to Pontsmill. The activity continued until the 1960s but was then closed down.

== Since 1948 ==
At the beginning of 1948, the main line railways of Great Britain were nationalised, under the Transport Act 1947 (10 & 11 Geo. 6. c. 49).

In the following years, the use of Fowey Harbour declined somewhat, and some jetties were closed. In January 1965 the passenger service between Lostwithiel and Fowey was closed.

The route between Par and Fowey closed in October 1968, and was immediately converted to be used as a private haul road for English China Clays (ECC) to carry china clay from the dries at Par to the deep water docks at Fowey. The formation was widened to make a two lane road, and ECC undertook a major modernisation of the handling equipment at Fowey. The railway route is almost entirely preserved as part of the haul road, including Pinnock Tunnel; it is now owned by Imerys.

== Services ==
A July 1878 public timetable shows two trains each way between Newquay and Fowey, calling at Halloon, Victoria, Bugle, Bridge, "Par St Blazey" and Fowey. There were two extra trips from Par St Blazey to Fowey. Par St Blazey was a single station, i.e. the later St Blazey.

The 1895 edition of Bradshaw's Guide shows three daily passenger trains between Lostwithiel and Fowey; eight from St Blazey to Fowey and nine returning; and four to and from Newquay.

== Locomotives ==
CMR 1 to 18
Type and origin
- Power type: Steam
- Builder: Sharp, Stewart & Co
Specifications
- Configuration
  - Whyte: 0-6-0T
- Gauge: 4 ft 8 1/2 in (1,435 mm)
- Driver dia.: 3 ft 6 in (1,070 mm)
- Wheelbase: 11 ft 0 in (3.35 m)
- Cylinder size: 16 1/4 by 20 inches (410 mm × 510 mm) stroke

The Cornwall Minerals Railway built St Blazey workshops to house and maintain its 18 locomotives. A roundhouse with nine roads was provided around a turntable, each of which could take a pair of locomotives which were designed to be operated as back-to-back pairs.

Numbered 1 to 18, the 0-6-0T locomotives were built by Sharp, Stewart and Company. Four carried names:

- 1 Treffrey
- 2 Lord Robartes
- 5 Fowey
- 6 Newquay

The name Treffrey was incorrectly spelt, it should have been Treffry after the owner of the Newquay railway and Par Tramway.

In 1876 the locomotives were transferred to the Great Western Railway who took over the operation of the lines. They kept nine locomotives but sold the remaining locomotives to the Lynn and Fakenham Railway, in Norfolk, and Colne Valley and Halstead Railway (Essex) as surplus to requirements. The retained locomotives were numbered 1392 to 1400 and rebuilt as 0-6-0STs, receiving many standardised fittings at the same time. The last one was withdrawn in 1936, but in 1910 five virtually identical locomotives, the GWR 1361 Class, had been built to work alongside them.

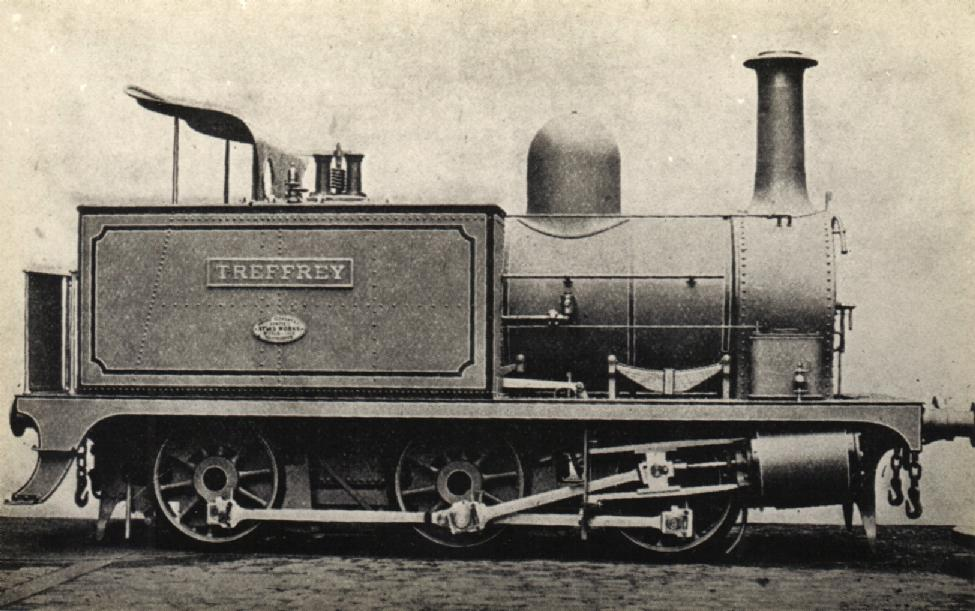
Treffrey, as built with incorrectly spelt nameplates

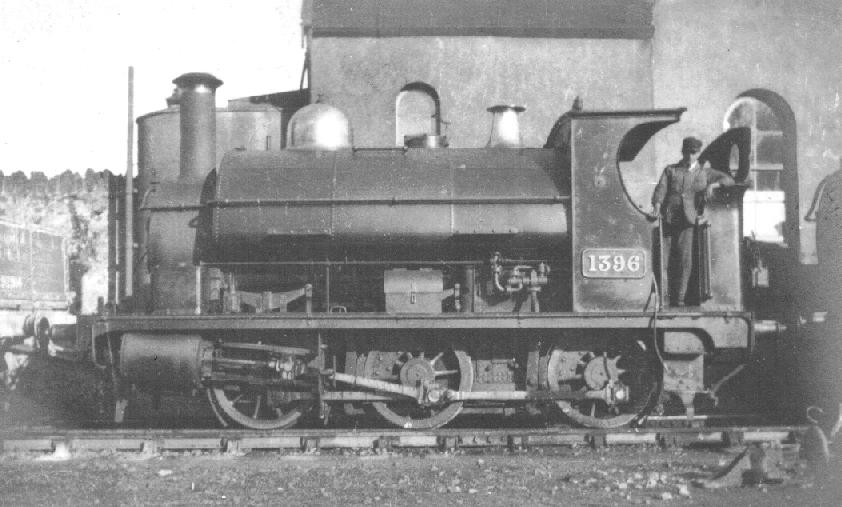
No. 5 as rebuilt by the Great Western Railway: 1396 at St Blazey railway station

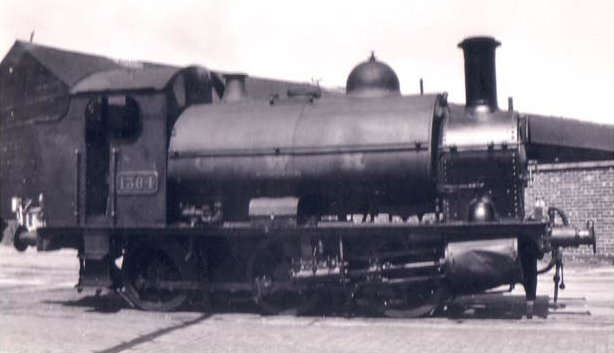
GWR-built 1364

CMR	Disposal	Withdrawn
1	GWR 1392	1906
2	GWR 1393	1936
3	GWR 1394	1933
4	GWR 1395	1934
5	GWR 1396	1934
6	GWR 1397	1933
7	GWR 1398, to Sharpness Docks in 1883	1924
8	GWR 1399	1934
9	GWR 1400; GWR 1398 from 1912	1936
10	to Colne Valley and Halstead Railway	1948
11	to Lynn and Fakenham Railway	1899
12	to Lynn and Fakenham Railway	1902
13	to Lynn and Fakenham Railway	1899
14	to Lynn and Fakenham Railway	1897
15	to Lynn and Fakenham Railway	1899
16	to Lynn and Fakenham Railway	1894
17	to Lynn and Fakenham Railway	1898
18	to Lynn and Fakenham Railway	1898

The Newquay and Cornwall Junction line was worked by broad gauge locomotives acquired from that railway's contractor. The Great Western Railway in 1876 decided not to use these and provided locomotives from their main fleet. A small shed at Burngullow housed the broad gauge locomotives.

An additional 0-6-0ST named Goonbarrow was obtained by the Cornwall Minerals Railway to operate its new branch in 1893. It was built by Peckett and Sons with 3 ft 7 in (1,090 mm) wheels and 14 in × 20 in (360 mm × 510 mm) cylinders. It became GWR 1388 in 1896 and was eventually sold to the Cwm Circ Colliery at Llanharan, Wales, 1911.

== Topography of the line ==
When the CMR opened its lines following the improvement to the Treffry lines, it was for goods and minerals only.

=== Main line: Fowey to Newquay ===
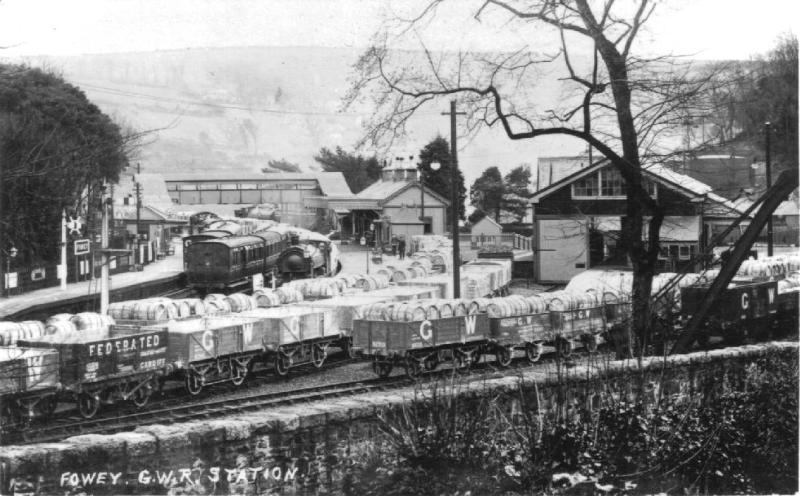
Fowey station in Great Western Railway days

The following stations were used for passenger services:

- Fowey – closed 1 January 1880; reopened 16 September 1895; closed 1 January 1940; reopened 9 February 1942; finally closed 4 January 1965
- Par – from 1879, Great Western Railway station on the main line
- St Blazey – known as Par until 31 December 1878; closed 29 December 1934
- Bridges – renamed Luxulyan 1 May 1905
- Bugle
- Victoria – renamed Roche 1 May 1904, as a goods depot it was known as Holywell until 1876
- Halloon – renamed St Columb Road 1 November 1878
- Newquay

St Dennis Junction was known as Bodmin Road Junction until 1878.

Tolcarn Junction was known as Treloggan Junction on the Newquay Railway, and then as Newquay Junction from 1874 to about 1885. The local community is Tolcarne, but the GWR, and later British Railways, omitted the final "e".

=== St Blazey to Fowey ===
The Fowey line climbed at 1 in 40 towards Par, falling after Pinnock Tunnel at about 1 in 50 to Par. After two fairly level miles comes a long climb up the Luxulyan Valley, some of it at 1 in 37, followed by slightly easier gradients to the summit at Roche, after which there is an almost continuous fall to Newquay.

The line between Fowey and St Blazey was closed in October 1968, and the trackbed was converted for use by English China Clays International as a road haul route; Pinnock tunnel is operated on an alternating one-way basis, controlled by traffic lights. It is still (2014) in operation, albeit on a reduced basis.

Par Harbour had extensive siding accommodation, and was reached by a southwards extension of the CMR line from St Blazey. It also had a direct connection from the St Austell direction on the main line, originally provided as the Cornwall Railway access to the harbour.

St Blazey had the semi-roundhouse built by the Cornwall Minerals Railway; the buildings are, as of 2021, in existence and are in use as workshops. They are grade II* listed buildings.
