= Fowey railway station =

Railway station in Cornwall

Coordinates: 50.3402°N 4.6356°W

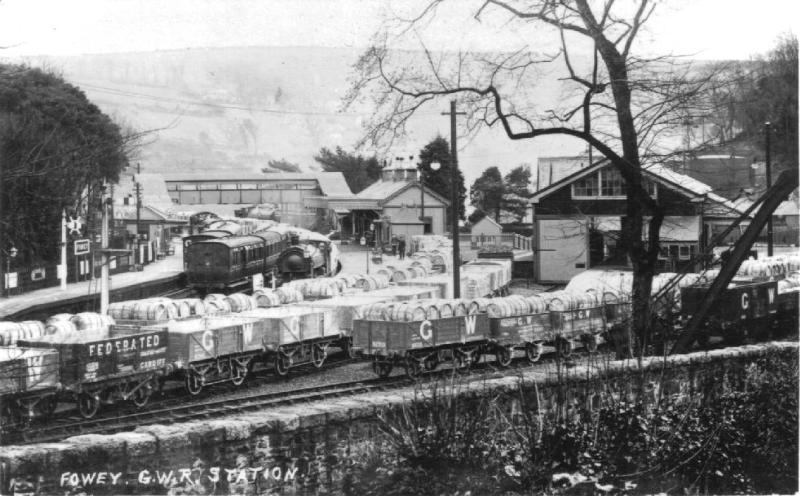
Fowey station

Fowey railway station (Cornish: Fowydh) was a station in Fowey, Cornwall from 1874 until 1965. The rail connection to the docks at Carne Point remains open for china clay traffic.

== History ==
The Lostwithiel and Fowey Railway (L&FR) had opened as far as Carne Point in 1869 but was never completed to the intended terminus at Fowey. The Cornwall Minerals Railway (CMR) arrived from the opposite direction in 1874. A passenger service from Fowey to Newquay via St Blazey started on 1 June 1874.

The station had two platforms with loading docks and a goods shed at the St Blazey end. It was situated at Caffa Mill Pill on the north side of the town by the River Fowey. Goods trains from St Blazey passed through the station to the jetties where ships could be loaded directly from the wagons.

The L&FR ceased operations at the end of 1879 but on 16 September 1895 a connection was made from the CMR's line to the Lostwithiel line which was refurbished. A passenger service introduced between Fowey and Lostwithiel. An intermediate station was opened at Golant on 1 July 1896, on the same day that the Cornwall Minerals Railway was amalgamated into the Great Western Railway.

The advertised passenger service to Newquay was withdrawn on 8 July 1929, although unadvertised workmen's trains continued to run to St Blazey until 29 December 1934. The station was host to a GWR camp coach from 1934 to 1939. A camping coach was also positioned here by the Western Region from 1952 to 1962, the coach was replaced in 1963 by two Pullman camping coaches which were in turn replaced by two larger coaches for a final season in 1964.

The Great Western Railway was nationalised into British Railways on 1 January 1948.

Preceding station	Historical railways	Following station
Terminus	Great Western Railway; Fowey to Newquay	St Blazey
Golant	Great Western Railway; Lostwithiel to Fowey	Terminus

== China clay exports ==
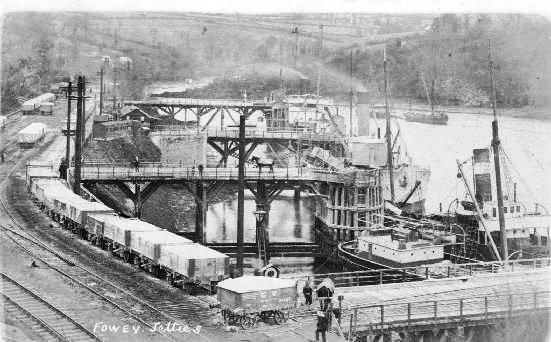
Looking from the station towards Carne Point with jetties 1 to 4 visible.

The L&FR built a jetty at Carne Point in 1869 and the CMR built three between Carne Point and their passenger station. A fourth jetty was added before 1919 when double-shift working was introduced to relieve a backlog of export orders and 200 additional railway wagons brought into service. A fifth jetty was completed in 1921 at a cost of £200,000. By 1923 there were eight jetties, numbered 1 to 8 from the station to Carne Point.

By the time that English China Clays took over the facilities in 1968 only five jetties remained in use. The main jetty is number 8, while numbers 4 and 6 could load china clay from rail wagons using conveyors. Number 5 only handled bagged china clay from road vehicles and number 3 handled liquid china clay slurry. Only number 8 is now used for rail traffic. It was modernised in 1988 to allow it to handle the new CDA 32 tonne hopper wagons.

== Closure and afterwards ==
The passenger service to Lostwithiel was withdrawn on 4 January 1965 and the remaining goods traffic from Par ceased on 1 July 1968. The railway was then converted into a private road to bring china clay from Par harbour. Reopening of the Lostwithiel line to passenger services was suggested in 2014.

The station has been demolished and the site is now a car park, although the original station house remains in the dock area.
