= Cornish China Clay Branches =

Railway branch lines in England

Overview
- Status: Partially Open
- Owner: Network Rail
- Locale: Cornwall

Service
- Type: Branch lines
- System: National Rail

Technical
- Line length: various
- Track gauge: 4 ft 8 1/2 in (1,435 mm) standard gauge

The Cornish China Clay Branches are a number of railway branch lines that serve facilities that produce or process China Clay. The area of Cornwall north of St Austell stretching from Bodmin Moor towards Truro is known for the extraction and processing of commercial volumes of China Clay, and with the expansion of the railways in the 19th century a number of lines were constructed to access various mines and clay-dries. Some branches have closed over the years, but several still operated into the 21st century although much of the China Clay traffic has transferred to road transport. In 2020 rail traffic remained in the shape of regular trains running between Parkandillack and the wharves at Carne Point where the large volumes required to be loaded onto ships for export would make road transport uneconomic.

== China Clay areas ==
While various clay dries were located alongside passenger lines, particularly the Par - Newquay line, most were served by freight-only lines of varying lengths, sometimes meandering to serve the varying locations. The longest branch diverged from the Par - Newquay line at St Dennis Junction, and while one part of this branch continued to the Cornish Main Line at Burngullow, the other ran further west, terminating at Meledor Mill. In addition there were shorter branches diverging between Luxulyan and Roche towards Carbis wharf, Wheal Rose and Carbean, and a further branch extending northward from near St Austell to Lansalon. Outside this area, the most notable freight-only branch serving clay dries was the ex-LSWR line to Wenfordbridge.

== Transport of China Clay by rail ==
China Clay in Cornwall has generally been "mined" from Clay pits by washing the clay and transporting it in suspension to a handling facility known as a "Clay Dry". Here the clay is held in settling tanks and then dried to a powder before being transported. Early use of China Clay was in pottery and it has been transported to the Staffordshire Potteries for over 100 years. For most of that time, dried clay was loaded into open wagons which were covered by a tarpaulin, and due to the nature of the product some China Clay companies owned their own wagons dedicated just to transporting the Clay. In 1945 the Great Western Railway, which served almost all of the China Clay areas in Cornwall, built a fleet of 500 open wagons specifically for the transport of China Clay, and these continued in use by British Railways after nationalisation. In the early 1970s the wagons had a metal bar added over which the tarpaulin was placed making a tent-like cover over the wagon and had zinc linings added, these "Clay-hood" wagons being synonymous with trainload china clay for over 20 years. These wagons worked to all of the Cornish Clay facilities, often being taken to a nearby yard before being formed into complete trains that travelled both to the Stoke-on-Trent area and over the comparatively short distance either to the port of Par or particularly to Carne Point at Fowey where the China Clay was loaded directly into vessels for export.

While bulk transport of China Clay was in open wagons, clay of a particularly high quality was bagged and transported in vans. Like the Clay Hoods these were originally of wooden construction and comparatively short wheelbase, but as larger air-braked wagons (CDA) were introduced in the 1980s these were replaced by larger curtain-sided wagons. At this time rail transport of Clay powder also changed with the introduction of large air-braked bogie wagons of 57 tonne capacity, which also facilitated the transport of "ball clay" where the clay remained in a sticky form rather than a dry powder. These wagons were privately owned by Tiger Rail and became known as "Clay Tigers", being a familiar sight on trains to the potteries, and also on trains to Sittingbourne in Kent and to several locations in Scotland for use in the paper industry. These were supplemented by the conversion of aggregate hoppers for use with China Clay, these often being used for wagonload freight, and the development of a flow of clay slurry in tank wagons which were of both four-wheeled and bogie types and operated specifically to paper mills.

== St Dennis junction - Burngullow line ==
The line from St Dennis Junction to Burngullow has its origins as two separate lines. The northern section was constructed by Squire Treffry as a tramway and opened around 1852 to the China Clay workings on Hendra Downs with a stationary engine at the Hendra Downs end. This line was later altered with a track designed for locomotive haulage diverging from the foot of the Hendra Downs incline and meeting the southern line near Drinnick Mill.

The southern part of the line was originally constructed to Broad Gauge in 1869, and the northern part, constructed to standard gauge, had a third rail added to make it mixed gauge. This extension of the broad gauge was never used and may have been of poor construction. The whole line was converted to standard gauge only as part of the GWR gauge conversion in 1892.

The line from Parkandillack south remained open in 1977, as did the sidings at Drinnick Mill but the track between Parkandillack and St Dennis was lifted. After this closure some wagons ran away over the end of the line and a train consisting of rerailing equipment and a crane hauled by a Class 47 attended, one of the few times that the type operated on the branch. There were proposals to divert trains to Newquay over the line and away from the Par - Newquay line in the 1990s, but these came to nothing and the line remains freight-only so that in 2006 there was a daily return trip to Parkandillack of China Clay hoppers booked to run Monday to Friday. In 2021 trains continue to run on the branch between Burngullow and Parkandillack hauled by Class 66 locomotives.

=== Gothers Siding ===
Originally a loop on the east side of the line allowing trans-shipment of China Clay from a 3 ft (914 mm) gauge tramway that ran for 2 mi (3.2 km) east and then south to serve Higher Gothers China Clay Works and then beyond to serve Lower Gothers China Clay Works. Constructed in 1879 the siding was referred to as Pochin Siding after H.D. Pochin who owned the Higher Gothers works and constructed the tramway. In 1929 the tramway had a branch added to serve a local Mica works, but the tramway closed in 1932 when H.D. Pochin was merged with other companies to form English China Clays Lovering Pochin, and the siding was lifted soon after.

=== Whitegates siding ===
Located west of the village of St Dennis, it consisted of a single siding on the west side of the line with a loading platform and access controlled by a Ground Frame. The siding officially closed on 4 January 1965.

=== Hendra Downs Tramway ===
The original purpose of the line when built was to provide easy access to the mines and Clay Works on Hendra Downs. This section of the line continued for about 0.5 mi (0.80 km) and terminated at an engine house. There is no evidence that this section was locomotive operated and the tracks were removed some time before 1914.

=== Parkandillack ===
Originally this short line was built to serve the China Clay Works of the St Dennis & Parkandillack China Clay Company, with an additional siding on the east of the line added in 1925 and a further siding on the western side to serve the works of United China Clays Limited. The original line, some 250 yd (230 m) in length, was accessed by a loop on the east side of the line. Due to an increase in traffic caused by the "Carpella Break", in 1911 a Signal Box was built to control movements, but this was closed in 1922 when the "break" was closed by a deviation and was replaced by a Ground Frame. The access loop was extended in 1958 and in 1972 the whole layout was expanded with an additional siding with its own loop. In 2021 there are weekday trains timetabled to destinations such as Fowey Carne Point and Exeter Riverside Yard, although these may run as required.

=== Treviscoe and Kernick sidings ===
Originally a loop on the east side of the line to serve the Central Treviscoe and General China Clay and China Stone Company, the loop was controlled by two ground frames and closed in 1934. Less than 400 yd (370 m) south of Central Treviscoe was a single siding on the west of the line for the Greater Treviscoe China Clay Company whose works were connected to the siding by a tramway and incline. Access to this siding was controlled by a Ground Frame. In 1911 a set of parallel sidings were installed on the opposite side of the line to Greater Treviscoe siding variously referred to as Treviscoe Siding and Kernick Siding, but later settling on the term Kernick Sidings. A Signal Box opened in 1913 and closed in 1950 to be replaced by 2 Ground Frames, with some track alterations being carried out at the same time. Greater Treviscoe Siding was removed in 1967 and further alterations were made to Kernick Sidings in 1971. These sidings are still in use in 2021, but are considered part of the Parkandillack complex for timetable purposes.

=== Trethosa siding ===
A short siding curving away on the south side of the line to serve the English China Clays works. The siding was removed in 1948 and the site has now been excavated as part of a clay pit.

=== Little Treviscoe Siding ===
A loop with an additional siding to serve another Clay Dry operated by English China Clays Ltd. Sources differ on the actual facility and the size and location of a tramway that may have fed the siding. The loop was controlled by 2 Ground Frames, and the siding and part of the loop were removed in 1967 so that, by the 1970s, there was just a short siding on the north side of the line remaining. Both the siding and the facility that it served were removed before 2020.

=== Goonvean ===
Three separate sidings were located near to Goonvean. Firstly on the south side of the line a complex of up to 3 sidings serving a facility of the Goonvean China Clay Company about 0.5 mi (0.80 km) distant with access controlled by a Ground Frame, the whole being removed in 1976 with most of the trackbed converted to use as a private road. Restowrack siding on the north side of the line was constructed after 1913 and served another facility run by the Goonvean China Clay Company, also having access controlled by a Ground Frame. Finally a further siding on the south side of the line with a Ground Frame controlling access, serving a small loading platform adjacent to the road. This siding, barely 50 yd (46 m) long, was taken out of use in 1965. Access to the three sidings near Goonvean stretches over a length of just 10 chains (200 m).

=== Luke's sidings ===
On the south side of the line, two sidings referred to as Luke's Old Siding and Luke's New Siding. Both of these were short open sidings serving different parts of the Goonamarris China Clay and Stone Works with access to each controlled by an individual Ground Frame. Located about 8 chains (160 m) apart, the Old siding was removed in 1960 and the New siding in 1963.

=== West of England Siding ===
A short siding serving the West of England China Stone Quarries which brought China Clay up by an inclined tramway, and by a second tramway of about 700 yd (640 m) running onto Restowrack Downs. From the 1930s until the 1960s this longer line was operated using two Simplex 0-4-0 petrol mechanical locomotives. The siding was removed in 1968.

=== Drinnick Mill, Nanpean and Carloggas ===
Two sidings on the east side of the line serving Clay Dries at Drinnick Mill, the second leaving directly from the line, and the first splitting to serve the dries on the east or passing beyond until terminating in two parallel sidings in Nanpean. The track then reversed under the original line to gain access to East Carloggas China Clay Works, and then extending 150 yd (140 m) to serve a loading platform, and latterly further clay dries. A map from 1906 shows a station at Drinnick Mill despite there being no record of any timetabled passenger service over the branch, although there was a Stationmaster there until the 1950s, and a goods office until 1966. The lines serving the dries at Drinnick Mill were removed in 1965 but access to Carloggas (or "Drinnick Mill Low Level") and Nanpean continued through the 1970s and into the 1990s where one of the lines at Nanpean was used to store redundant tank wagons. By 1990 clay from here was occasionally added to the Speedlink service from St Blazey yard variously to Mossend Yard or Auchmuty in Scotland. By 2020 all of the tracks have been removed, and the trackbed under the line is in use as a private road.

=== Carpella sidings and the Carpella Break ===
Carpella Siding, actually two parallel sidings each servicing a loading platform and protected by a Ground Frame, was connected by a tramway to both the Carpella China Clay Works and Whealburn China Clay Works. However the Carpella United Clay Company owned the right to excavate the area including under the trackbed which resulted in subsidence and the line was severed about 440 yd (400 m) beyond the siding on 16 December 1909, meaning that access to the siding was only possible via St Dennis Junction, although both stubs were retained with the gap between them, known as the "Carpella Break" being just 20 chains (400 m) in length. In 1921 a single "New Carpella Siding" was opened to serve the Carpella United China Clay Works replacing the tramway, and in April 1922 a short deviation was constructed to reconnect the two halves of the line, the southern stub line having been removed in 1917. The Northern stub siding was removed in 1949 and the original Carpella siding was removed in 1968. New Carpella siding was still in use in the 1970s but all trace of it had been removed by 2020. At this point the line still consisted of wooden sleepers and bull-head rail into the 1990s.

=== Beacon siding and High Street siding ===
Originally a short loop, High Street siding served a short loading platform on the north side of the line but in 1928 the loading platform was removed and a siding installed leading from the loop into a works operated by Beacon Clays Ltd and referred to as Beacon Siding. Beacon siding was removed in 1963 and the loop in 1968.

=== Crugwallins and Burngullow ===
On the east side of the line were a series of Clay Dries. The northern site was Crugwallins siding which had a loop serving two Clay Dries and protected by a ground frame. Nearer the Cornish Main Line was Burngullow West siding, serving a large Clay Dry, again with a loop, but with access requiring reversal via a headshunt which also provided access to a short loading platform. Burngullow West ceased operation in 1974 but Crugwallins continued to operate into the 1990s. In 2020 all signs of the rail links have been removed but the disused Clay Dries remain, though derelict.

== Meledor Mill line ==
The line opened on 1 June 1874 to Melangoose Mill, with the extension to Meledor Mill opening in 1912. The "Retew branch" was operated by an electric token until 1966 from which time it was operated as a long siding. The line remained open in 1977, but traffic was growing less and closure came in the early 1980s. By 2020 the line beyond West Treviscoe had been swallowed by china clay pits and all sign of the Melangoose Mill buildings had disappeared.

=== Gaverigan siding ===
A single loop protected by Ground Frames on the west side of the line, it was still in use in the 1970s.

=== Trerice siding ===
A single line on the west side leading into the Wheal Remfrey Brickworks. The brickworks had a small 2 ft (610 mm) internal railway which operated a pair of 4-wheel diesel-mechanical locomotives by Ruston & Hornsby between 1945 and 1963.

=== Wheal Remfrey siding ===
A single siding accessed from a loop on the east side of the line giving access to the Wheal Remfrey China Clay Works. Laid in 1924 with access controlled by two Ground Frames, both the loop and siding were removed in 1966.

=== Trewheela siding ===
A wide loop in the east side of the line serving the Trewheela China Clay Company dries. The siding was protected by 2 Ground Frames and was removed in 1966.

=== Retew siding ===
A single line on the west side splitting into two to serve the Anchor China Clay Syndicate Limited, plus a single siding on the east side serving the South Fraddon China Clay Company. The clay works were linked by a 2 ft (610 mm) gauge tramway which was operated by 2 Ruston & Hornsby 0-4-0 diesel-mechanical locomotives both built in 1945. Loco number 90907 was sold on in 1954 and loco number 4 was sold in 1963 after which the track was lifted. Both sidings were protected by Ground Frames and were removed within a year of each other in the early 1970s.

=== New Halwyn siding ===
At some time after 1900, a loop on the west side of the line protected by Ground Frames and serving the New Halwyn China Clay Company. An additional loop, controlled by 2 separate Ground Frames, was put in almost parallel with New Halwyn siding but on the opposite side of the line, in 1920. New Halwyn siding ceased operation in 1966 and the loop opposite was removed in 1972.

=== Melangoose Mill complex ===
Melangoose Mill is a complex series of sidings and buildings, all located on the west side of the line. Approaching from St Dennis Junction, Anchor Siding North Ground Frame gives access to Wheal Benallick siding which accesses the two parts of Melangoose Clay Works, with a track exiting between the two buildings. This leads onto a parallel track diverging at Anchor Siding South Ground Frame which gives access to Melangoose Mill public siding and then extends to a wagon turntable. This was at one time the end of the line, the wagon turntable giving access to a tramway that ran for about 0.5 mi (0.80 km) to the Virgina China Clay pit. In 1912 a curve was laid to link the existing line to the tramway which was then extended to Meledon Mill. Almost immediately on the new stretch of line a line diverges as Grove siding, and two additional sidings parallel to the line were added in 1925. At a distance of 9 chains (180 m) further is a trailing junction to Anchor Siding which followed the old tramway and served the works of the Anchor China Clay Syndicate. The wagon turntable is part way along this siding. The public siding and the line to the wagon turntable were removed in 1973, as was the connection at Anchor Siding North Ground Frame and the two parallel sidings that had been installed in 1925.

=== Victoria siding ===
A single siding protected by a Ground Frame, the double loop installed at Melangoose Mill in 1925 exited onto the siding. The siding was removed in 1965 and the connection with the branch, which had allowed access to the two parallel sidings, was removed in 1972.

=== West Treviscoe Siding ===
A single loop siding with gated access and protected by Ground Frames and serving West Treviscoe China Clay Company. The line was removed in 1965.

=== Tolbenny and Burgotha sidings ===
Almost opposite each other, Tolbenny siding was on the east side serving a Clay Dry and protected by a gate. It was opened in 1931 and was removed in 1972. Burgootha siding was on the west of the line at the same point as the commencement of a loop and serving the Newquay China Clay Company. The siding was removed in 1965.

=== Melbur siding ===
A long siding on the west side of the line serving the Melbur China Clay Works.

=== Meledor Mill and siding ===
Alongside the Melbur siding was a loop and siding providing access from the road for general goods and when extended in 1925 the railway ended at the Road, however in 1929 the line was extended across the road to connect directly to Meledor Mill Clay Dries.

== Goonbarrow branch ==
The Goonbarrow Branch was opened by the Cornwall Minerals Railway in 1893, who operated the line until they were taken over by the GWR in 1896. The line itself was quite tightly curved and steep in parts with the approach to Carbean being 1 in 39. Originally a locomotive was based in an engine shed at Stenalees to work the branch, and the tight curvature meant that only small engines were used, often in pairs. The last steam locomotives to operate on the branch were 1600 class locomotives, with a pair based at St Blazey shed for this purpose.

Goonbarrow Junction itself underwent several changes to trackwork over the years. The origins were as Wheal Henry siding, with Rosevear siding set back from it, and with a signal box provided at the junction. The original signal box closed in 1893 and was replaced by a new one a short distance south. The sidings remained, and the branch was laid just north with a short loop. Four or five sidings were added parallel to the Newquay branch but accessed via the junction in 1910, and in 1931 further sidings were added, accessed by entering the branch and immediately reversing once the pointwork was cleared. These were known as Rocks siding, Wheal Ann siding, and Hallivet siding.

Originally the line was worked as a branch with a staff being collected from the signal box, but from 1964 staff operation was removed and the branch was operated as a long siding. The line was truncated beyond New Caudledown siding in 1965, and the branch officially closed in 1978. However a stub remained and was resleepered with concrete sleepers and flat-bottomed rail and in 2006 there was a daily train of China Clay running Monday-Saturday each way between the sidings at Goonbarrow Junction and Carne Point. By 2014 the truncated branch ended in a pair of wooden sleepers chained to the track with an octagonal red stop sign attached and while the rails continue beyond this for a short distance they are completely covered in moss. In 2020 satellite images show that the stub of the branch is still acting as a headshunt for the Rocks clay dries that cover the site taken up previously by the three sidings added in 1931, but the rest of the branch is completely lost in the ever expanding clay pits.

=== Sidings at Goonbarrow ===
In the 1990s Rocks siding and Wheal Henry siding were still in use with Rocks dries still active and two industrial diesel shunters working there, and although these were both stored out of use in 2019, they were both back at work in 2020.

=== Old Beam siding ===
Requiring reversal to access, the siding was protected by a Ground Frame and served the North Goonbarrow Clay Company. The headshunt was converted into a loop in 1907, and the siding closed in 1969.

=== Carnsmerry siding and Imperial siding ===
Originally a single siding serving the Imperial Goonbarow China Clay works, a second siding was added to serve the Hensbarrow China Clay Company works at Carnsmerry in 1914, at which point a Ground Frame was installed and the headshunt was converted into a loop.

=== New Caudledown siding ===
A loop on the north side of the line serving the Lower Lemalson and Caudledown China Clay Company. Branch operation ceased beyond this in 1964 and the "branch" was then operated as a siding.

=== Rock Hill siding ===
Two short sidings on the north side of the line protected by a Ground Frame. The sidings were removed in 1946.

=== Old Caudledown siding ===
A single siding protected by a Ground Frame and serving a loading platform.

=== Cleaves siding ===
A single siding on the west side of the line opposite Stenalees and protected by a Ground Frame, it was removed in 1933.

=== Oil siding ===
A short siding on the south side of the line to serve the Carbean China Clay works of J Lovering and Co. The track was laid in late 1925 but was not used until 1926.

=== New Gunheath siding ===
A short siding on the north side of the line, it was laid in 1921.

=== Gunheath sidings ===
Two sidings serving the works of H D Pochin and Co. plus a short section of line for reversing towards Carbean, an additional siding was added in 1927. The branch sloped down at 1 in 39 to the sidings, and all points were controlled from a Ground Frame.

=== Carbean ===
Requiring reversal at Gunheath sidings and then a short run downhill at 1 in 35, there was a loop serving a loading platform and a further reversal here allowed access to the Goods Yard. The points were controlled by a Ground Frame. The siding space at Carbean was quite cramped and shunting often involved multiple movements. By 1992 the location of the siding was partially lost in a clay pit.

== Carbis and Wheal Rose branches ==
The divergence of these two short branches that originally left the Newquay branch over a space of 11 chains (220 m) was completely remodelled several times over the years. Initially they were two separate branches with the Wheal Rose branch junction being south of Bugle station and the line running parallel to the Newquay branch before diverging north of the station immediately before the junction for the branch to Carbis Wharf. Around 1910 a short link was added so that trains to and from the Carbis branch could use the Wheal Rose line and avoid using the line through the platform at Bugle. The line through Bugle was doubled in 1930 with no change to the access to the branches, but in 1965 the line was singled again and the connection to the Newquay line north of Bugle station was removed so that both branches merged into a single line which continued as one of the original double-track lines while the Newquay line used the other track.

There were never any run-round facilities and all traffic was propelled down the branch. Both the Carbis Wharf and Wheal Rose lines were still open in 1977 and while the line to Wheal Rose closed in the 1980s the Carbis Wharf line finally closed at the end of the decade. The last train to Carbis Wharf ran on 19 June 1989 when Class 37 number 37669 retrieved a single bogie clay wagon, and the track was lifted in the first months of 1992. In 2020 the line of the branch was still traceable on satellite images, with the last few hundred metres being in use as a road serving a china clay pit.

=== Wheal Virgin ===
A short line diverging sharply to the west side of the line. Latterly known as Great Beam works.

=== Martins new siding ===
A short siding parallel to the line serving part of the Wheal Rose works.

=== Wheal Rose siding ===
A line with a loop serving the Clay Dries at Wheal Rose. The loop was extended into a second siding at a later date.

=== West Goonbarrow siding ===
A short siding constructed around 1910 to serve the United China Clay Company works. The works were several feet lower than the line and there was a short incline leading down to the dries, with a catch point and access controlled by a Ground Frame. The siding was closed in 1948 but the tracks were still in situ in 1968.

=== Rosemellyn siding ===
A siding with a loop serving the Clay Dries of the Rosemellyn China Clay Company. A Ground frame controlled access to the siding, which was removed in 1948.

=== Carbis Wharf ===
A pair of parallel sidings at the end of the line, the southern siding serving the works of the Goonvean and Restowrack China Clay Company at Great Wheal Prosper Clay Dry, and the other with a loading dock used by the Carbis Brickworks. Even after the end of steam there was a daily service to the dries but traffic grew less until the last train, which ran on 25 August 1989, consisted of just a single 46 tonne PGA wagon bound for Mossend Yard. By 2015 the old clay dries had been converted into holiday accommodation.

== Trenance valley line ==
Constructed rather later than most China Clay branches, the Trenance Valley line started when a single siding was laid in 1914 just east of St Austell viaduct, with a Signal Box and trailing crossover controlling access from the Cornish Main Line. The line was extended and the branch created in time to be opened on 1 May 1920, leaving at Trenance Junction and running for just less than 1.75 mi (2.82 km). The crossover on the Cornish Main Line was removed in 1932 and the signal box at the junction was closed in 1949. Possibly the only recorded passenger train on the branch was a special consisting of Bubble Car 55015 which traversed the line on 14 July 1963, although a special consisting of a pair of Prairie tanks and several brake vans had run the previous year. The line closed completely on 6 May 1968 and the track was lifted in 1969. Towards the end of steam, trains were hauled by a Pannier tank, which was replaced by a Class 08 shunter which ran the trains after dieselisation. In 2020 the route is still discernable on satellite images over most of its length but none of the rail-assiociated buildings remain.

=== Lansalson yard ===
Two long parallel sidings, the northernmost serving a loading platform, and also two short sidings setting back and both located on the north side of the line to serve Boskell China Clay works. These facilities were closed in May 1964 and the line terminated at 1 mile 35 chains, although the tracks were not lifted until August 1966.

=== Boskell China Clay Works ===
A long siding splitting into three lines looped together at the extremity. A Ground Frame controlled access.

=== Lower Ruddle Yard ===
A short siding on the north side of the line and splitting to run either side of a loading platform, and with a Ground Frame controlling access.

=== Bojea yard ===
A pair of sidings either side of a curved loading platform, there was also a small complex of sidings where the line for the yard met the valley line. Originally 4 looped sidings, two were removed in 1964. There was a Ground Frame at each end of the siding complex.

=== Carlyon Farm siding ===
A long loop on the east side of the line with a Ground Frame at each end, a siding was added in 1930 to serve the works of Lovering China Clay Ltd. The siding was 12 chains (240 m) long, and closed in 1964.
