= English China Clays =

Mining company

- Company type: Public
- Industry: Mining
- Founded: 1919
- Defunct: 1999
- Fate: Acquired
- Successor: Imerys
- Headquarters: St Austell, UK
- Key people: Lawrence Urquhart (Chairman)

English China Clays PLC, or ECC, was a mining company involved in the extraction of china clay, based in St Austell, Cornwall. It was once a constituent of the FTSE 100 Index but in 1999 was acquired by Imetal.

== History ==
English China Clays was incorporated in April 1919 through the amalgamation of three of the largest producers: Martin Bros.(established in 1837), West of England China Clay & Stone (1849) and the North Cornwall China Clay Company (1908). The three companies accounted for around half the industry's output at the time. Before the First World War there had been as many as seventy individual china clay producers but the industry had suffered from overcapacity and wartime dislocation. More mergers were to follow. Months after the ECC merger, H.D. Pochin acquired J.W. Higman taking it to third place in the industry after ECC and Lovering China Clays. Even then it was estimated that the demand for clay was not much more that half of the industry's capacity.

Between 1929 and 1931 the industry’s output fell by a third, and ECC was losing money. The solution was a merger of the three leading producers. English China Clays became a holding company and its assets were transferred to a new operating company, English Clays Lovering Pochin; ECC held 63 per cent of the new joint company. In the few years that followed, many of the smaller clay companies were acquired.

In 1951 ECC acquired Lovering’s shares in the operating company followed in 1954 by the purchase of the remaining Pochin minority. With ECC now having full ownership of the operating company, the management structure was overhauled and four operating divisions created – china clay, building, quarrying and transport.

The Hudson history extends only to 1969. By then; the china clay division had benefitted from the growing market for china clay, both home and abroad, helped by the increased demand for coated paper. The cumbersome pit structure had been modernised and investment made in new plant. By the end of the 1960s ECC was producing around 2.5m tons of china clay a year. ECC had also expanded into the ball clay market (used in the building industry) and, with over 250,000 tons a year, accounted for nearly half of British output.

As with the clay division, the quarries division had grown through acquisition and produced a variety of stone, principally for the construction industry, and its operations extended well beyond its west country base into Leicestershire, Lancashire and the home counties.

The building division comprised the firm of Selleck Nicholls Williams which had been acquired by ECC in 1945. It was noted for its Cornish Unit house, made from concrete which used spoil from the clay pits; in the early 1950s it was the largest producer of pre-cast concrete system houses. The division built for local authorities across the country and developed private housing estates in its local Devon and Cornwall areas – an activity which was to be substantially expanded in the years to come.

=== Growth of private housing ===
After the 1960s, ECC began to regard private estate development as a suitable investment for surplus cash generated by the clay operation. The division was substantially expanded in 1984 by the acquisition of the Swindon-based firm of Edwin H Bradley a family firm founded in 1902. Bradley brought with it the well-known Bradstone building blocks and Bradley Estates with its extensive land holdings. ECC was now building over 1000 private houses a year and in 1986 made a contested, but unsuccessful, bid for the larger Bryant Homes; it was left with a 29 per cent holding. Nevertheless, housing sales reached almost 1300 in 1989 and its trading margins were the highest of any large housebuilder.

=== Demise of the business ===
A change in management in the early 1990s led to the decision to focus ECC more closely on its original china clay business. Housing volumes were allowed to decline and the rump of the land was sold in 1994 and 1995. At the same time, ECC Quarries was demerged under the name Camas. Finally, in 1999 ECC International was acquired by the French company Imetal which subsequently changed its name to Imerys.

== Technology and innovation ==
The Buell dryer was first developed by English China Clays for their china clay processing plants in Cornwall. The Buell dryer is a multiple hearth direct heated industrial dryer (commonly known as a turbo dryer) that has modified for drying china clay.
