= Buell dryer =

Industrial dryer used in china clay mining

The Buell dryer, also known as the "turbo shelf" dryer, is an indirectly heated industrial dryer once widely used in the Cornwall and Devon china clay mining industry. The Buell dryer was built by the German company Büttner-Werke AG and introduced to the china clay industry by English Clays Lovering Pochin & Co. Ltd for their china clay drying plants in Cornwall and Devon, as part of the mechanization and modernization of the industry, which up to that point had been using the same primitive processing methods for almost 100 years.

== History ==
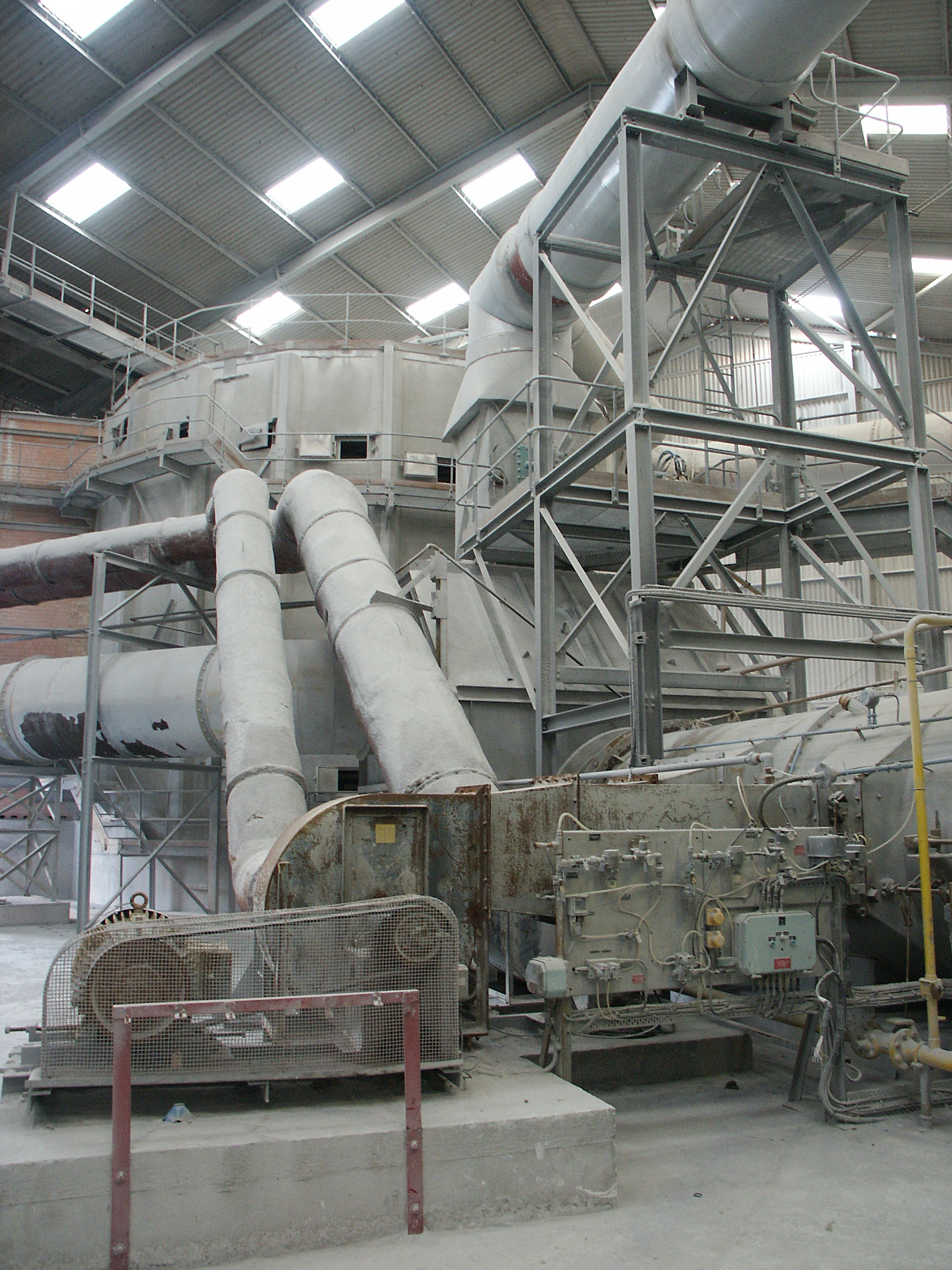
A Buell dryer at ECC Rocks near Bugle, Cornwall

The industry's first attempt to mechanize its drying process, an oil-fired rotary dryer installed at Rockhill near Stenalees in 1939, had been halted before it could be commissioned by the outbreak of war, with the Board of Trade exercising its wartime powers to place restrictions on the industry, rationing in particular the use of oil and steel. To circumvent these restrictions, in 1944 a Buell dryer was purchased second hand from a fluorspar mine in Derbyshire, and was installed in an existing building at ECLP's Drinnick site in Nanpean, heated by exhaust steam from Drinnick power plant. As such, it became the first operating mechanical dryer in the Cornish china clay industry, despite not being the first to be constructed.

A 1948 Board Of Trade Working Party report into the China Clay industry concluded that restrictions on the industry should be relaxed to allow mechanization to begin. The 1948 report led to Parliament ordering an end to Board Of Trade restrictions on the china clay industry, leading to a period of rapid mechanization.

In the 25 years that followed, additional Buell dryers were constructed at Kernick, Drinnick, Rocks, Blackpool near Burngullow, Marsh Mills, Parkandillack, Par Harbour, and Goonvean & Rostowrack Ltd's Trelavour site. The Drinnick dryer site was also expanded to include several more steam-heated dryers.

== Construction ==
The dryer itself is composed of a large upright cylindrical chamber, inside of which are 25 to 30 layers of trays or "hearths". Indirectly heated air from an oil-fired (latterly natural gas-fired) furnace or steam heater is distributed throughout the dryer by a series of fans and ducts. At the center of the dryer is a rotating column, to which the trays are attached and positioned radially within the dryer. Material enters the top of the dryer and lands on one of the top trays. As the central column rotates, fixed arms push the material off the tray, dropping it down onto the one below it. Gradually the material works its way down through the dryer in this manner, and after 45 minutes, clay exits the bottom of the dryer onto conveyor belts.

The material to be dried usually enters the top of the dryer with a moisture content of around 18%, and exit at around 8-10%. Generally, these figures all depend on the dewatering processes employed before the material reaches the dryer. Commonly, the Buell dryer handled shredded filter press cakes from standard square plate filter presses, although these were later replaced by a circular-plate filter press capable of operating at much higher pressure. After being shredded, these press cakes were brought by conveyor belt to a paddle mixer in which the cakes were back-mixed with dried clay. The back-mixed clay could then either be extruded into pellets and fed directly to the dryer or, depending on the grade of clay to be produced, might go through an additional stage of pug milling.
