= Kaolinite =

Phyllosilicate clay mineral

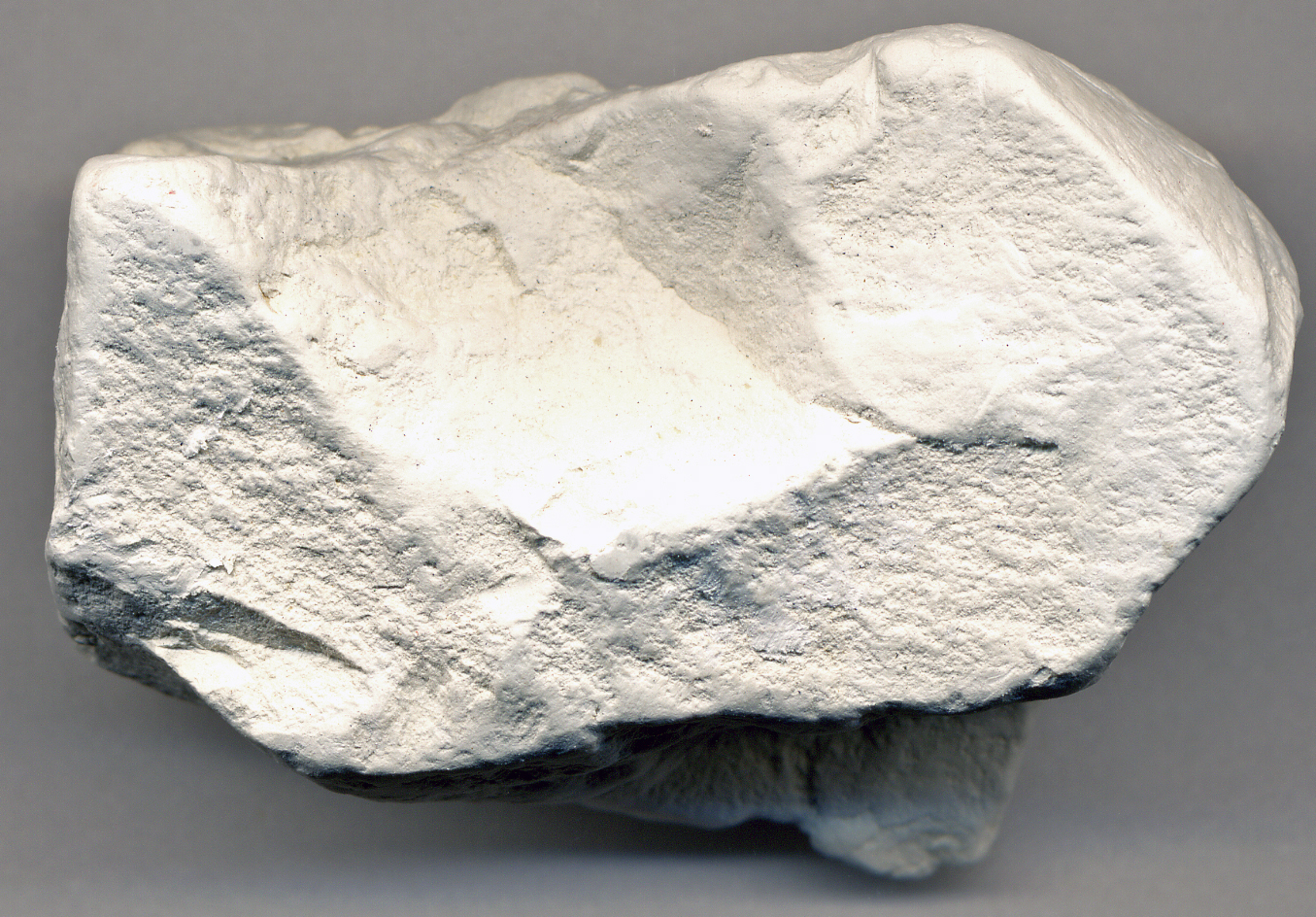

General
- Category: Phyllosilicate minerals
- Group: Kaolinite-Serpentine group, kaolinite subgroup
- Formula: Al_{2}Si_{2}O_{5}(OH)_{4}, or in oxide notation: Al_{2}O_{3}·2SiO_{2}·2H_{2}O
- IMA symbol: Kln
- Strunz classification: 9.ED.05
- Crystal system: Triclinic
- Crystal class: Pedial (1) (same H-M symbol)
- Space group: P1
- Unit cell: a = 5.13 Å, b = 8.89 Å c = 7.25 Å; α = 90° β = 104.5°, γ = 89.8°; Z = 2

Identification
- Color: White to cream, sometimes red, blue or brown tints from impurities and pale-yellow; also often stained various hues, tans and browns being common.
- Crystal habit: Rarely as crystals, thin plates or stacked. More commonly as microscopic pseudohexagonal plates and clusters of plates, aggregated into compact, claylike masses.
- Cleavage: Perfect on {001}
- Tenacity: Flexible but inelastic
- Mohs scale hardness: 2–2.5
- Luster: Pearly to dull earthy
- Streak: White
- Specific gravity: 2.16–2.68
- Optical properties: Biaxial (–)
- Refractive index: n_{α} = 1.553–1.565, n_{β} = 1.559–1.569, n_{γ} = 1.569–1.570
- 2V angle: Measured: 24° to 50°, Calculated: 44°

Kaolinite (/ˈkeɪ.ələˌnaɪt, -lɪ-/ KAY-ə-lə-nyte, -lih-; also called kaolin) is a clay mineral, having the chemical composition Al_{2}Si_{2}O_{5}(OH)_{4}. It is a layered silicate mineral, with one "tetrahedral" sheet of silicate tetrahedra (SiO_{4}) linked to one "octahedral" sheet of aluminate octahedrons (AlO_{2}(OH)_{4}) through oxygen atoms on one side, and another such sheet linked through hydrogen bonds on the other side.

Kaolinite is a soft, earthy, usually white, mineral (dioctahedral phyllosilicate clay), produced by the chemical weathering of aluminium silicate minerals like feldspar. It has a low shrink–swell capacity and a low cation-exchange capacity (1–15 meq/100 g).

Rocks that are rich in kaolinite, and halloysite, are known as kaolin (/ˈkeɪ.əlɪn/) or china clay. In many parts of the world, kaolin is colored pink-orange-red by iron oxide, giving it a distinct rust hue. Lower concentrations of iron oxide yield white, yellow, or light orange colors of kaolin. Alternating lighter and darker layers are sometimes found, as at Providence Canyon State Park in Georgia, United States.

Kaolin is an important raw material in many industries and applications. Commercial grades of kaolin are supplied and transported as powder, lumps, semi-dried noodle, or slurry. Global production of kaolin in 2021 was estimated to be 45 million tonnes, with a total market value of US $4.24 billion.

== Names ==
The English name kaolin was borrowed in 1727 from François Xavier d'Entrecolles's 1712 French reports on the manufacture of Jingdezhen porcelain. D'Entrecolles was transcribing the Chinese term 高嶺土, now romanized as gāolǐngtǔ in pinyin, taken from the name of the village of Gaoling ("High Ridge") near Ehu in Fuliang County, now part of Jiangxi Province's Jingdezhen Prefecture. The area around the village had become the main source of Jingdezhen's kaolin over the course of the Qing dynasty. The mineralogical suffix -ite was later added to generalize the name to cover nearly identical minerals from other locations.

Kaolinite is also occasionally discussed under the archaic names lithomarge and lithomarga from Latin lithomarga, a combination of litho- (Ancient Greek: λίθος，líthos, "stone") and marga ("marl"). In more proper modern use, lithomarge now refers specifically to a compacted and massive form of kaolin.

== Chemistry ==
=== Notation ===
The chemical formula for kaolinite as written in mineralogy is Al_{2}Si_{2}O_{5}(OH)_{4}, however, in ceramics applications the same formula is typically written in terms of oxides, thus giving Al_{2}O_{3}·2SiO_{2}·2H_{2}O.

=== Structure ===
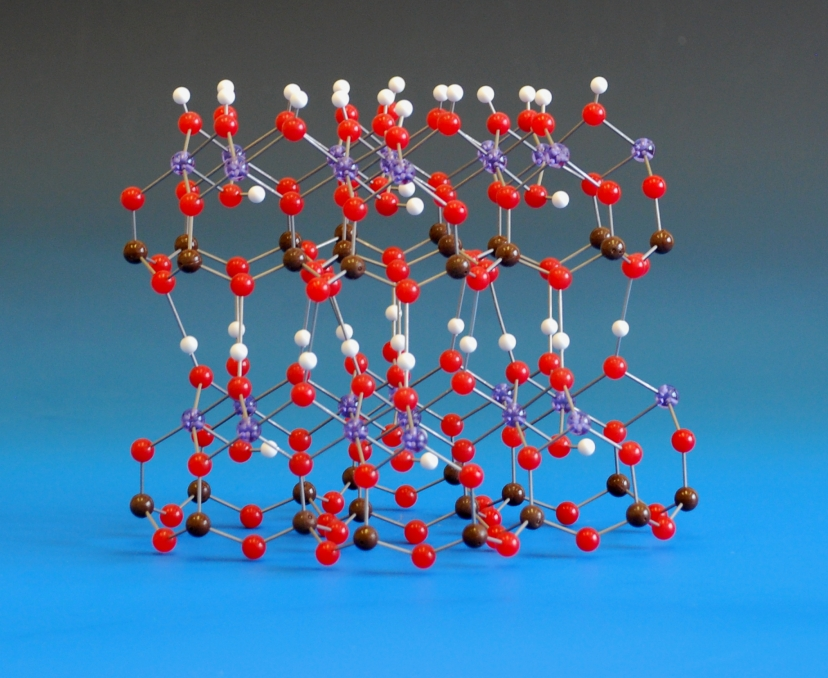
Kaolinite structure, showing the interlayer hydrogen bonds

Compared with other clay minerals, kaolinite is chemically and structurally simple. It is described as a 1:1 or TO clay mineral because its crystals consist of stacked TO layers. Each TO layer consists of a tetrahedral (T) sheet composed of silicon and oxygen ions bonded to an octahedral (O) sheet composed of oxygen, aluminium, and hydroxyl ions. The T sheet is so called because each silicon ion is surrounded by four oxygen ions forming a tetrahedron. The O sheet is so called because each aluminium ion is surrounded by six oxygen or hydroxyl ions arranged at the corners of an octahedron. The two sheets in each layer are strongly bonded together via shared oxygen ions, while layers are bonded via hydrogen bonding between oxygen on the outer face of the T sheet of one layer and hydroxyl on the outer face of the O sheet of the next layer.

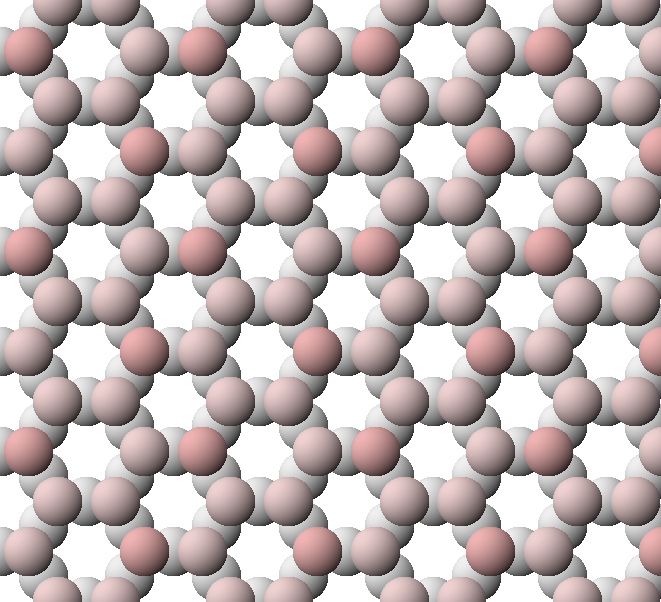
View of the structure of the tetrahedral (T) sheet of kaolinite

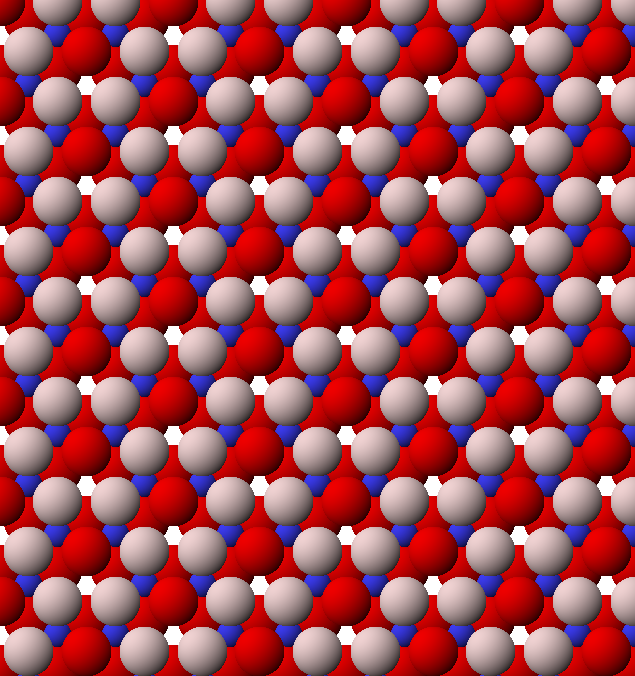
View of the structure of the octahedral (O) sheet of kaolinite

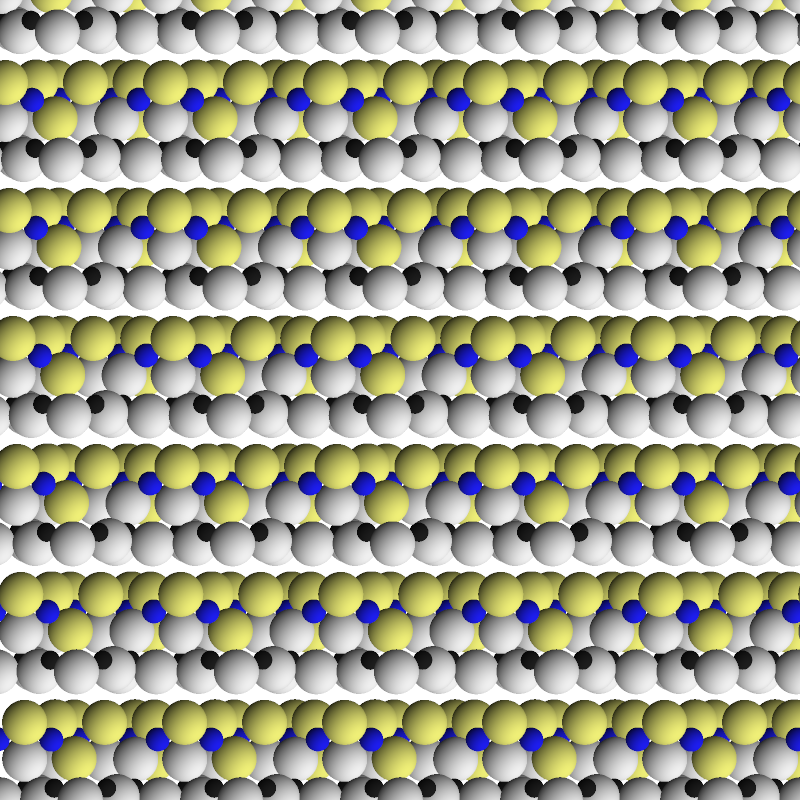
Kaolinite crystal structure, looking along the layers

A kaolinite layer has no net electrical charge, thus there are no large cations (such as calcium, sodium, or potassium) between layers as with most other clay minerals. This accounts for kaolinite's relatively low ion exchange capacity. The close hydrogen bonding between layers also hinders water molecules from infiltrating between layers, accounting for kaolinite's nonswelling character.

When moistened, the tiny platelike crystals of kaolinite acquire a layer of water molecules that cause crystals to adhere to each other and give kaolin clay its cohesiveness. The bonds are weak enough to allow the plates to slip past each other when the clay is being molded, but strong enough to hold the plates in place and allow the molded clay to retain its shape. When the clay is dried, most of the water molecules are removed, and the plates hydrogen bond directly to each other, so that the dried clay is rigid but still fragile. If the clay is moistened again, it will once more become plastic.

=== Structural transformations ===
Kaolinite group clays undergo a series of phase transformations upon thermal treatment in air at atmospheric pressure.

==== Milling ====
High-energy milling of kaolin results in the formation of a mechanochemically amorphized phase similar to metakaolin, although the properties of this solid are quite different. The high-energy milling process is highly inefficient and consumes a large amount of energy.

==== Drying ====
Below 100 °C, exposure to low humidity air will result in the slow evaporation of any liquid water in the kaolin. At low moisture content the mass can be described leather dry, and at near 0% moisture it is referred to as bone dry.

Above 100 °C any remaining free water is lost. Above around 400 °C hydroxyl ions (OH^{−}) are lost from the kaolinite crystal structure in the form of water: the material cannot now be plasticised by absorbing water. This is irreversible, as are subsequent transformations; this is referred to as calcination.

==== Metakaolin ====
Endothermic dehydration of kaolinite begins at 550–600 °C producing disordered metakaolin, but continuous hydroxyl loss is observed up to 900 °C (1,650 °F). Although historically there was much disagreement concerning the nature of the metakaolin phase, extensive research has led to a general consensus that metakaolin is not a simple mixture of amorphous silica (SiO_{2}) and alumina (Al_{2}O_{3}), but rather a complex amorphous structure that retains some longer-range order (but not strictly crystalline) due to stacking of its hexagonal layers.

Al_{2}Si_{2}O_{5}(OH)_{4} → Al_{2}Si_{2}O_{7} + 2 H_{2}O

==== Spinel ====
Further heating to 925–950 °C converts metakaolin to an aluminium-silicon spinel which is sometimes also referred to as a gamma-alumina type structure:

2 Al_{2}Si_{2}O_{7} → Si_{3}Al_{4}O_{12} + SiO_{2}

==== Platelet mullite ====
Upon calcination above 1050 °C, the spinel phase nucleates and transforms to platelet mullite and highly crystalline cristobalite:

3 Si_{3}Al_{4}O_{12} → 2 [ 3 Al_{2}O_{3} · 2 SiO_{2} ] + 5 SiO_{2}

==== Needle mullite ====
Finally, at 1400 °C the "needle" form of mullite appears, offering substantial increases in structural strength and heat resistance. This is a structural but not chemical transformation. See stoneware for more information on this form.

== Occurrence ==
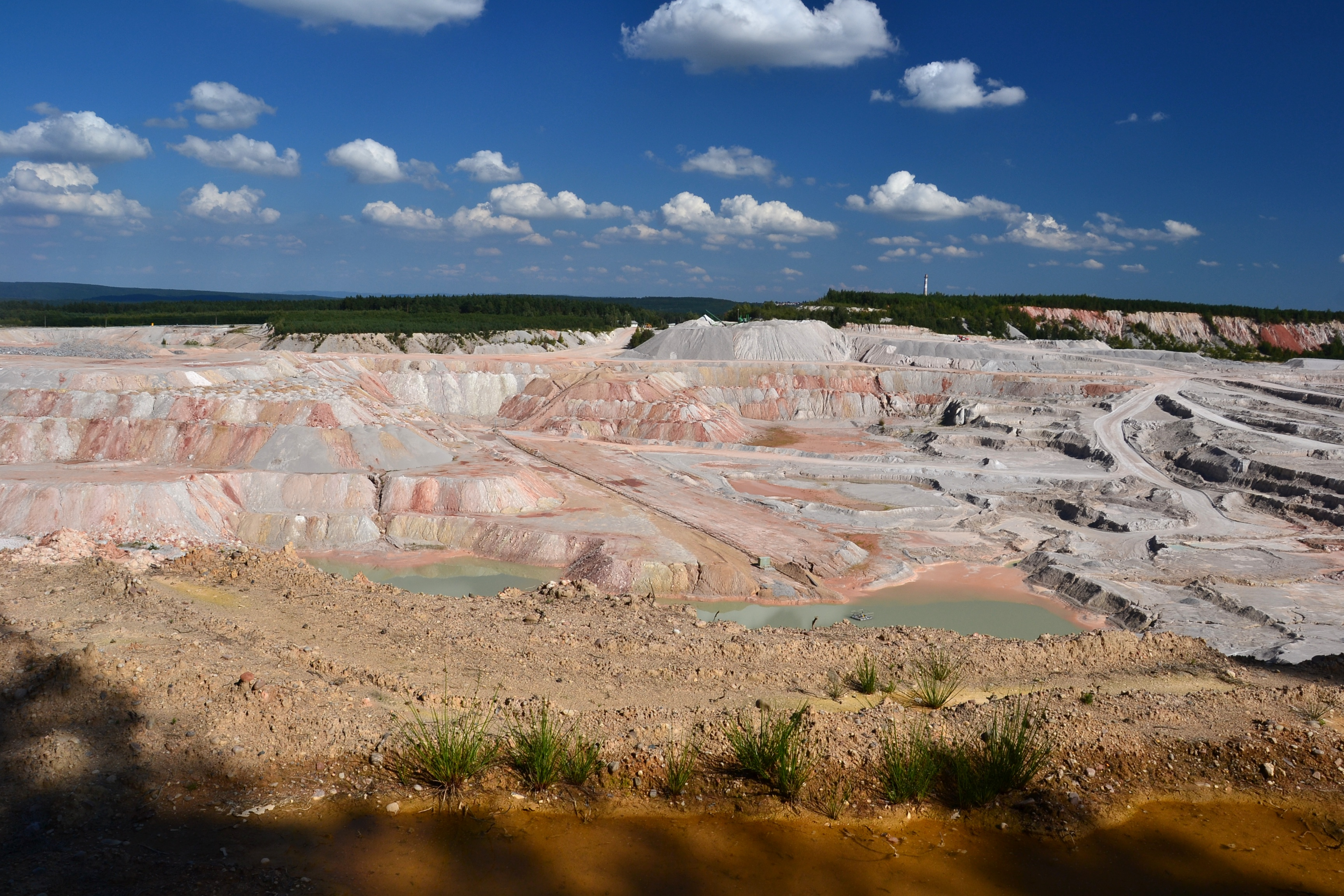
Kaolin mine in Czech Republic

Kaolinite is one of the most common minerals; it is mined, as kaolin, in Australia, Brazil, Bulgaria, China, Czech Republic, France, Germany, India, Iran, Malaysia, South Africa, South Korea, Spain, Tanzania, Thailand, United Kingdom, United States and Vietnam.

Mantles of kaolinite are common in Western and Northern Europe. The ages of these mantles are Mesozoic to Early Cenozoic.

Kaolinite clay occurs in abundance in soils that have formed from the chemical weathering of rocks in hot, moist climates; for example in tropical rainforest areas. Comparing soils along a gradient towards progressively cooler or drier climates, the proportion of kaolinite decreases, while the proportion of other clay minerals such as illite (in cooler climates) or smectite (in drier climates) increases. Such climatically related differences in clay mineral content are often used to infer changes in climates in the geological past, where ancient soils have been buried and preserved.

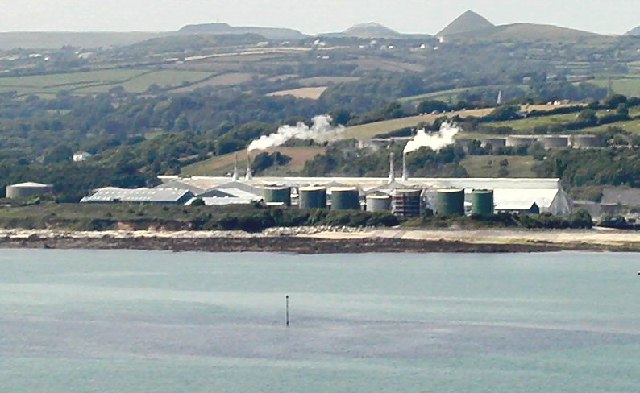
A kaolin processing plant

In the National Institute of Agronomic Studies and Research (INERA) classification system, soils in which the clay fraction is predominantly kaolinite are called kaolisol (from kaolin and soil).

In the United States, the main kaolin deposits are found in central Georgia, on a stretch of the Atlantic Seaboard fall line between Augusta and Macon. This area of thirteen counties is called the "white gold" belt; Sandersville is known as the "Kaolin Capital of the World" due to its abundance of kaolin. In the late 1800s, an active kaolin surface-mining industry existed in the extreme southeast corner of Pennsylvania, near the towns of Landenberg and Kaolin, and in what is present-day White Clay Creek Preserve. The product was brought by train to Newark, Delaware, on the Newark-Pomeroy line, along which can still be seen many open-pit clay mines. The deposits were formed between the late Cretaceous and early Paleogene, about 100 to 45 million years ago, in sediments derived from weathered igneous and metakaolin rocks. Kaolin production in the United States during 2011 was 5.5 million tons.

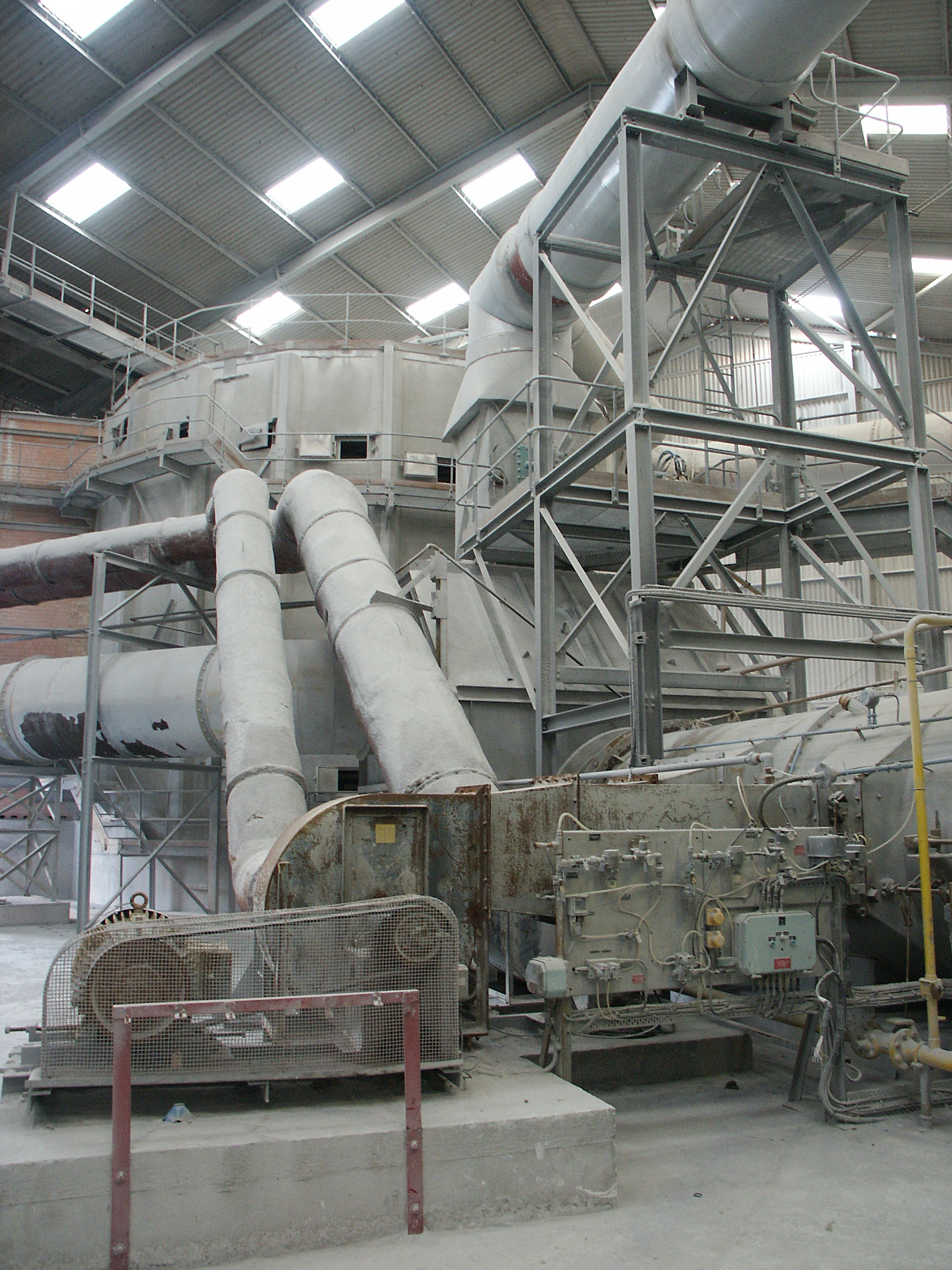
A Buell dryer in the UK, which is used to dry processed kaolin

During the Paleocene–Eocene Thermal Maximum sediments deposited in the Espluga Freda area of Spain were enriched with kaolinite from a detrital source due to denudation.

== Synthesis and genesis ==
Difficulties are encountered when trying to explain kaolinite formation under atmospheric conditions by extrapolation of thermodynamic data from the more successful high-temperature syntheses. La Iglesia and Van Oosterwijk-Gastuche (1978) thought that the conditions under which kaolinite will nucleate can be deduced from stability diagrams, based as they are on dissolution data. Because of a lack of convincing results in their own experiments, La Iglesia and Van Oosterwijk-Gastuche (1978) had to conclude, however, that there were other, still unknown, factors involved in the low-temperature nucleation of kaolinite. Because of the observed very slow crystallization rates of kaolinite from solution at room temperature Fripiat and Herbillon (1971) postulated the existence of high activation energies in the low-temperature nucleation of kaolinite.

At high temperatures, equilibrium thermodynamic models appear to be satisfactory for the description of kaolinite dissolution and nucleation, because the thermal energy suffices to overcome the energy barriers involved in the nucleation process. The importance of syntheses at ambient temperature and atmospheric pressure towards the understanding of the mechanism involved in the nucleation of clay minerals lies in overcoming these energy barriers. As indicated by Caillère and Hénin (1960) the processes involved will have to be studied in well-defined experiments, because it is virtually impossible to isolate the factors involved by mere deduction from complex natural physico-chemical systems such as the soil environment. Fripiat and Herbillon (1971), in a review on the formation of kaolinite, raised the fundamental question how a disordered material (i.e., the amorphous fraction of tropical soils) could ever be transformed into a corresponding ordered structure. This transformation seems to take place in soils without major changes in the environment, in a relatively short period of time, and at ambient temperature (and pressure).

Low-temperature synthesis of clay minerals (with kaolinite as an example) has several aspects. In the first place the silicic acid to be supplied to the growing crystal must be in a monomeric form, i.e., silica should be present in very dilute solution (Caillère et al., 1957; Caillère and Hénin, 1960; Wey and Siffert, 1962; Millot, 1970). In order to prevent the formation of amorphous silica gels precipitating from supersaturated solutions without reacting with the aluminium or magnesium cations to form crystalline silicates, the silicic acid must be present in concentrations below the maximum solubility of amorphous silica. The principle behind this prerequisite can be found in structural chemistry: "Since the polysilicate ions are not of uniform size, they cannot arrange themselves along with the metal ions into a regular crystal lattice." (Iler, 1955, p. 182)

The second aspect of the low-temperature synthesis of kaolinite is that the aluminium cations must be hexacoordinated with respect to oxygen (Caillère and Hénin, 1947; Caillère et al., 1953; Hénin and Robichet, 1955). Gastuche et al. (1962) and Caillère and Hénin (1962) have concluded that kaolinite can only ever be formed when the aluminium hydroxide is in the form of gibbsite. Otherwise, the precipitate formed will be a "mixed alumino-silicic gel" (as Millot, 1970, p. 343 put it). If it were the only requirement, large amounts of kaolinite could be harvested simply by adding gibbsite powder to a silica solution. Undoubtedly a marked degree of adsorption of the silica in solution by the gibbsite surfaces will take place, but, as stated before, mere adsorption does not create the layer lattice typical of kaolinite crystals.

The third aspect is that these two initial components must be incorporated into one mixed crystal with a layer structure. From the following equation (as given by Gastuche and DeKimpe, 1962) for kaolinite formation

2Al(OH)_{3} + 2H_{4}SiO_{4} → Si_{2}O_{5}•Al_{2}(OH)_{4} + 5H_{2}O

it can be seen that five molecules of water must be removed from the reaction for every molecule of kaolinite formed. Field evidence illustrating the importance of the removal of water from the kaolinite reaction has been supplied by Gastuche and DeKimpe (1962). While studying soil formation on a basaltic rock in Kivu (Zaïre), they noted how the occurrence of kaolinite depended on the "degrée de drainage" of the area involved. A clear distinction was found between areas with good drainage (i.e., areas with a marked difference between wet and dry seasons) and those areas with poor drainage (i.e., perennially swampy areas). Kaolinite was only found in the areas with distinct seasonal alternations between wet and dry. The possible significance of alternating wet and dry conditions on the transition of allophane into kaolinite has been stressed by Tamura and Jackson (1953). The role of alternations between wetting and drying on the formation of kaolinite has also been noted by Moore (1964).

=== Laboratory syntheses ===
Syntheses of kaolinite at high temperatures (more than 100 °C [212 °F]) are relatively well known. There are for example the syntheses of Van Nieuwenberg and Pieters (1929); Noll (1934); Noll (1936); Norton (1939); Roy and Osborn (1954); Roy (1961); Hawkins and Roy (1962); Tomura et al. (1985); Satokawa et al. (1994) and Huertas et al. (1999). Relatively few low-temperature syntheses have become known (cf. Brindley and DeKimpe (1961); DeKimpe (1969); Bogatyrev et al. (1997)).

Laboratory syntheses of kaolinite at room temperature and atmospheric pressure have been described by DeKimpe et al. (1961). From those tests the role of periodicity becomes convincingly clear. DeKimpe et al. (1961) had used daily additions of alumina (as AlCl_{3}·6 H_{2}O) and silica (in the form of ethyl silicate) during at least two months. In addition, adjustments of the pH took place every day by way of adding either hydrochloric acid or sodium hydroxide. Such daily additions of Si and Al to the solution in combination with the daily titrations with hydrochloric acid or sodium hydroxide during at least 60 days will have introduced the necessary element of periodicity. Only now the actual role of what has been described as the "aging" (Alterung) of amorphous alumino-silicates (as for example Harder, 1978 had noted) can be fully understood. As such, time is not bringing about any change in a closed system at equilibrium; but a series of alternations of periodically changing conditions (by definition, taking place in an open system) will bring about the low-temperature formation of more and more of the stable phase kaolinite instead of (ill-defined) amorphous alumino-silicates.

== Applications ==
=== Main ===
In 2009, up to 70% of kaolin was used in the production of paper. Following reduced demand from the paper industry, resulting from both competing minerals and the effect of digital media, in 2016 the market share was reported to be: paper, 36%; ceramics, 31%; paint, 7% and other, 26%. According to the USGS, in 2021 the global production of kaolin was estimated to be around 45 million tonnes.

- Paper applications require high-brightness, low abrasion and delaminated kaolins. For paper coatings it is used to enhance the gloss, brilliance, smoothness and receptability to inks; it can account for 25% of mass of the paper. As a paper filler it is used as a pulp extender, and to increase opacity; it can account for 15% of mass.
- In whiteware ceramic bodies, kaolin can constitute up to 50% of the raw materials. In unfired bodies it contributes to the green strength, plasticity and rheological properties, such as the casting rate. During firing it reacts with other body components to form the crystal and glass phases. With suitable firing schedules it is key to the formation of mullite. The most valued grades have low contents of chromophoric oxides such that the fired material has high whiteness. In glazes it is primarily used as a rheology control agent, but also contributes some green strength. In both glazes and frits it contributes some SiO_{2} as a glass network former, and Al_{2}O_{3} as both a network former and modifier.

=== Other industrial ===
- As a raw material for the production of an insulation material called Kaowool (a form of mineral wool).
- An additive to some paints to extend the titanium dioxide (TiO_{2}) white pigment and modify gloss levels.
- An additive to modify the properties of rubber upon vulcanization.
- An additive to adhesives to modify rheology.
- As adsorbents in water and wastewater treatment.
- In its altered metakaolin form, as a pozzolan; when added to a concrete mix, metakaolin accelerates the hydration of Portland cement and takes part in the pozzolanic reaction with the portlandite formed in the hydration of the main cement minerals (e.g. alite).
- Metakaolin is also a base component for geopolymer compounds.

=== Medical ===
- To soothe an upset stomach, similar to the way parrots (and later, humans) in South America originally used it (more recently, industrially produced).
- Kaolin-based preparations are used for treatment of diarrhea.
- An ingredient in 'pre-work' skin protection and barrier creams.
- To induce and accelerate blood clotting. In April 2008 the US Naval Medical Research Institute announced the successful use of a kaolinite-derived aluminosilicate infusion in traditional gauze which is still the hemostat of choice for all branches of the US military. See Kaolin clotting time and QuikClot.
- As a mild abrasive in toothpaste.

=== Cosmetics ===
- As a filler in cosmetics.
- For facial masks or soap.
- for spa body treatments, such as body wraps, cocoons, or spot treatments.

=== Archaeology ===
- As an indicator in radiological dating since kaolinite can contain very small traces of uranium and thorium.

=== Geophagy ===
- Humans sometimes eat kaolin for pleasure or to suppress hunger, a practice known as geophagy. In Africa, kaolin used for such purposes is known as kalaba (in Gabon and Cameroon), calaba, and calabachop (in Equatorial Guinea). Consumption is greater among women, especially during pregnancy, and its use is sometimes said by women of the region to be a habit analogous to cigarette smoking among men. The practice has also been observed within a small population of African-American women in the Southern United States, especially Georgia, likely brought with the traditions of the aforementioned Africans via slavery. There, the kaolin is called white dirt, chalk or white clay.

=== Geotechnical engineering ===
- Research results show that the utilization of kaolinite in geotechnical engineering can be alternatively replaced by safer illite, especially if its presence is less than 10.8% of the total rock mass.

=== Small-scale uses ===
- As a light-diffusing material in white incandescent light bulbs.
- In organic farming as a spray applied to crops to deter insect damage, and in the case of apples, to prevent sunburn and/or sunscald.
- As whitewash in traditional stone masonry homes in Nepal.
- As a filler in Edison Diamond Discs.

== Production output ==
Global production of kaolin by country in 2012 was estimated to be:

Thousands of tonnes
Global - total	26,651
Egypt	275
Nigeria	100
Algeria	80
Tanzania	45
Sudan	35
Uganda	30
South Africa	15
Ethiopia	2
Kenya	1
Africa - total	583
China	3,950
South Korea	800
Vietnam	650
Malaysia	450
Thailand	180
Indonesia'	175
India	75
Bangladesh	20
Taiwan	17
Pakistan	15
Sri Lanka	11
Japan	3
Philippines	2
Asia - total	6,348
Germany	4,800
UK	1,000
Czech Republic	650
Italy	625
France	350
Portugal	325
Spain	300
Bosnia–Herzegovina	250
Bulgaria	225
Russia	170
Poland	125
Ukraine	100
Serbia	90
Austria	65
Denmark	3
Europe - total	9,078
US	5,900
Mexico	120
N. America - total	6,020
Iran	1,500
Turkey	725
Jordan	100
Saudi Arabia	70
Iraq	3
Middle East - total	2,398
Australia	40
New Zealand	11
Oceania - total	51
Brazil	1,900
Argentina	80
Paraguay	66
Chile	60
Colombia	20
Peru	20
Ecuador	15
Venezuela	10
Guatemala	2
S. & C. America - total	2,173

== Typical properties ==
Some selected typical properties of various ceramic grade kaolins are:

Product name	SSP	Premium	Longyan 325#	Zettlitz 1A	OKA
Country	UK	New Zealand	China	Czech Republic	Germany
Manufacturer	Imerys	Imerys	Logyan	Sedlecky	AKW
% < 2 μm	85	97	25	56	82
% <1 μm	50	88	15	41	50
SiO_{2}, %	48.0	49.5	49.3	48.0	49.5
Al_{2}O_{3}, %	37.0	35.5	35.5	37.0	35.5
Fe_{2}O_{3}, %	0.44	0.29	0.22	0.68	0.43
TiO_{2}, %	0.01	0.09	0.01	0.20	0.17
CaO, %	0.10	-	0.03	0.08	0.20
MgO, %	0.25	-	0.25	0.23	0.02
K_{2}O, %	1.25	-	1.90	0.92	0.30
Na_{2}O, %	0.15	-	0.09	0.07	0.01
LOI%	12.8	13.8	11.9	12.9	13.4
Kaolinite, %	95	-	40	89	86
Halloysite, %	-	92	40	-	-
Mica, %	4	-	-	-	-
Quartz, %	1	4	3	1	8
Smectite, %	-	-	-	1	6
Cristobalite, %	-	4	-	-	-

== Safety ==
NFPA 704 safety square
- 1 0 0 Kaolin

Kaolin is generally recognized as safe, but may cause mild irritation of the skin or mucous membranes. Kaolin products may also contain traces of crystalline silica, a known carcinogen if inhaled.

In the US, the Occupational Safety and Health Administration (OSHA) has set the legal limit (permissible exposure limit) for kaolin exposure in the workplace as 15 mg/m^{3} total exposure and 5 mg/m^{3} respiratory exposure over an 8-hour workday. The National Institute for Occupational Safety and Health (NIOSH) has set a recommended exposure limit (REL) of 10 mg/m^{3} total exposure TWA 5 mg/m^{3} respiratory exposure over an 8-hour workday.

== See also ==
- China stone – Type of altered granite
- Clay pit – Open-pit mining for the extraction of clay minerals
- Dickite – Phyllosilicate mineral in the kaolinite subgroup
- Halloysite – Phyllosilicate mineral in the kaolinite subgroup
- Kaolin Deposits of Charentes Basin, France – Sedimentary clay deposits in France
- Kaolin spray – Kaolin-based pest control
- Medicinal clay – Use of clay in health care
- Nacrite – Phyllosilicate mineral: group of kaolinite
- Cornish China Clay Branches – Railway branch lines in England
